= Guangzhou Women and Children's Medical Center station =

Guangzhou Metro station

Coordinates: 23°07′21″N 113°19′28″E

Guangzhou Women and Children's Medical Center 妇儿中心
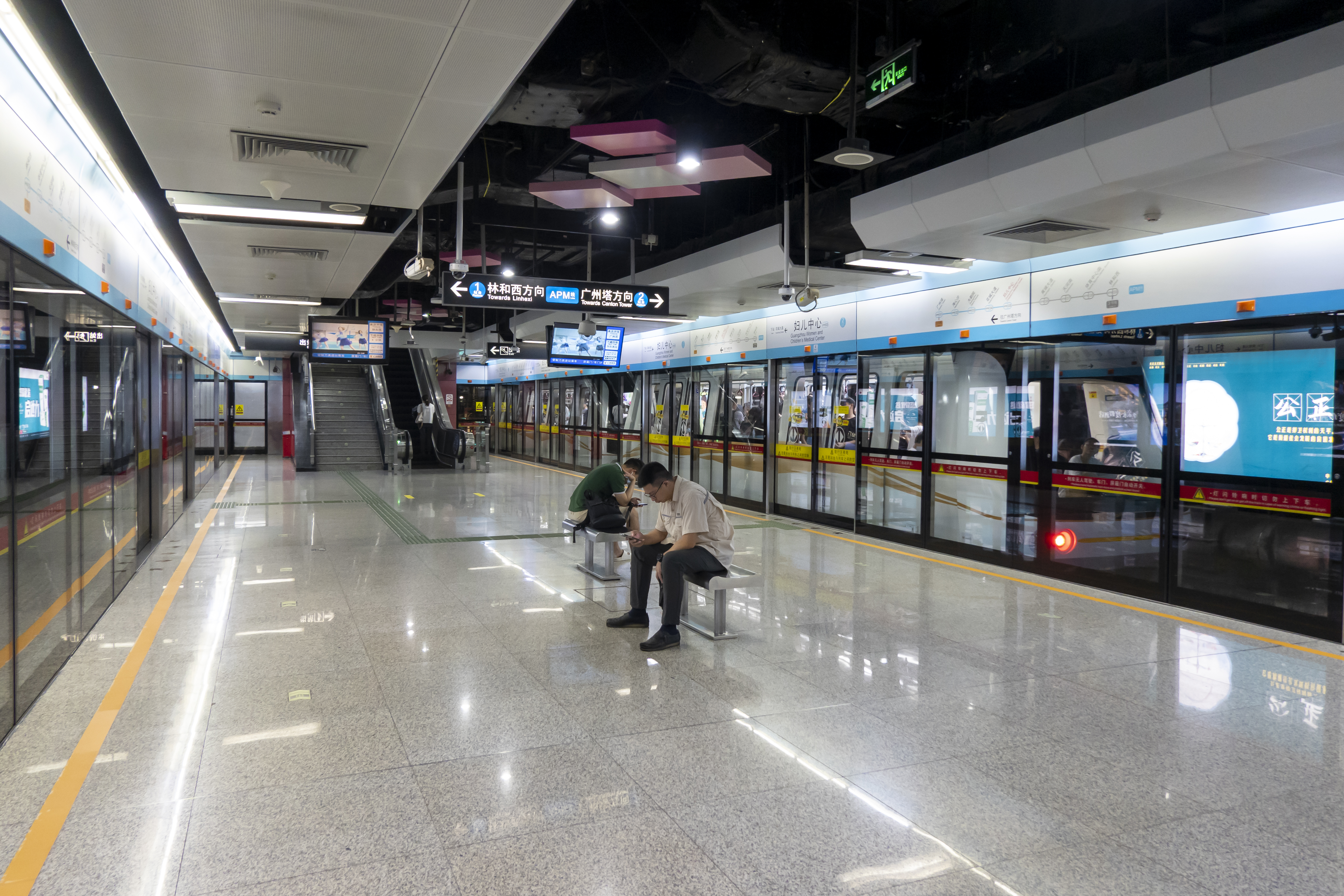

Chinese name
- Simplified Chinese: 妇儿中心站
- Traditional Chinese: 婦兒中心站
Transcriptions
Standard Mandarin
- Hanyu Pinyin: Fù'ér Zhōngxīn Zhàn
Yue: Cantonese
- Jyutping: fu^{5}ji^{4} zung^{1}sam^{1} zaam^{6}

General information
- Location: Zhujiang New Town, Tianhe District, Guangzhou, Guangdong; China
- Operated by: Guangzhou Metro Co. Ltd.
- Line: APM line
- Platforms: 2 (1 island platform)

Construction
- Structure type: Underground

Other information
- Station code: APM05

History
- Opened: 8 October 2010; 15 years ago

Services
Preceding station	Guangzhou Metro	Following station
Huacheng Dadao towards Canton Tower	APM line	Huangpu Dadao towards Linhexi
Location

Guangzhou Women and Children's Medical Center (Chinese: 妇儿中心站), formerly Jinsui Lu Station (金穗路站) and Central Plaza Station (市民广场站) during planning, is a metro station of the Guangzhou Metro APM line in the Zhujiang New Town of Tianhe District. It is located at the underground of the south of Jinsui Lu (金穗路), the west of Agricultural Bank of China Building, and R&F Grand Hyatt Hotel. It started operation on 8 November 2010.

== Station layout ==
G	-	Exits
L1; Concourse	Lobby	Customer Service, Vending machines, ATMs
L2; Platforms	Platform 2	APM towards Canton Tower (Huacheng Dadao)
L2; Platforms	Island platform, doors will open on the left
L2; Platforms	Platform 1	APM towards Linhexi (Huangpu Dadao)

== Exits ==
Exit number	Exit location
Exit A	Jinsui Lu
Exit B	Zhujiang Donglu
