= Guangzhou Opera House station =

Guangzhou Metro station

Coordinates: 23°06′58″N 113°19′28″E

Guangzhou Opera House 大剧院
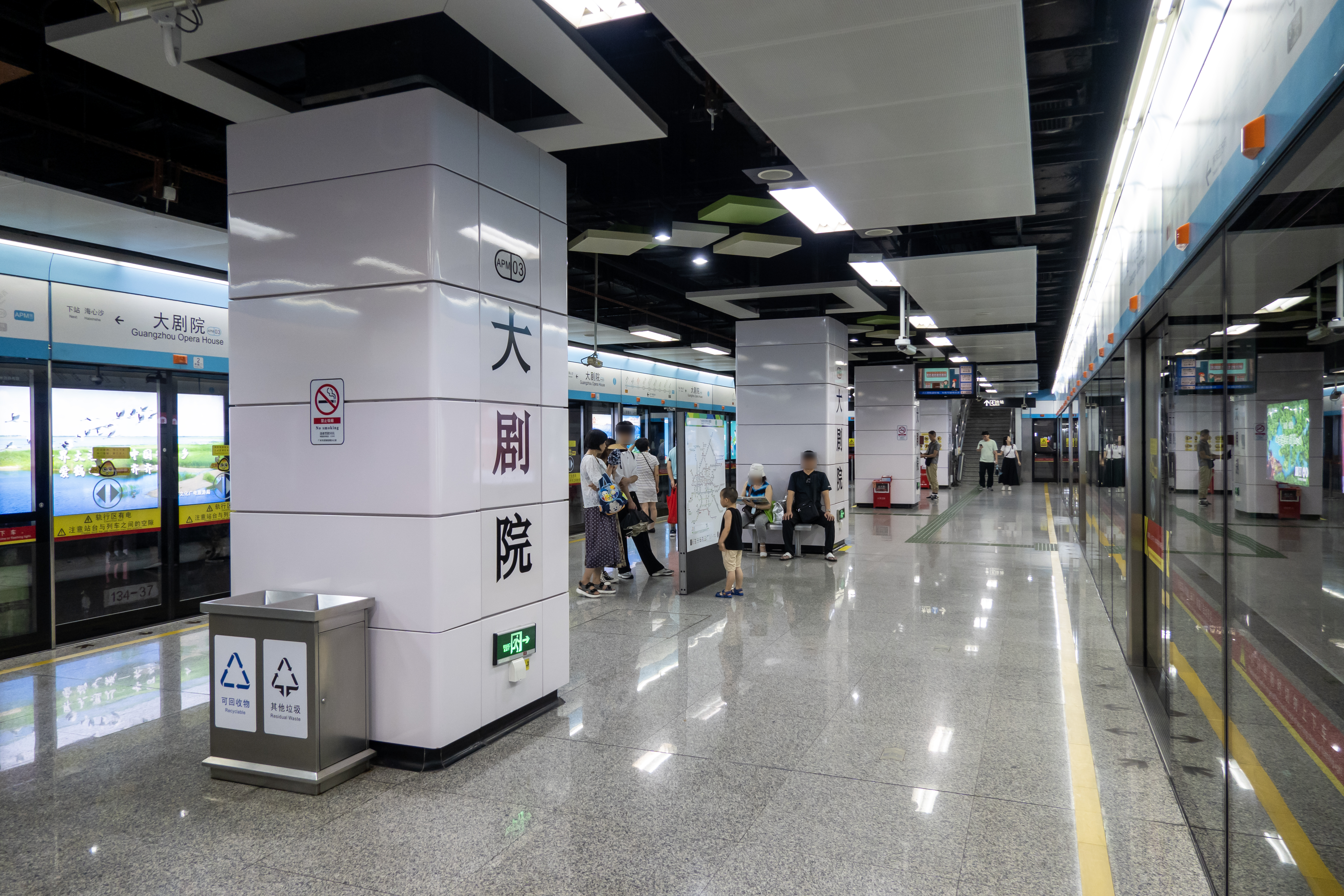

Chinese name
- Simplified Chinese: 大剧院站
- Traditional Chinese: 大劇院站
Transcriptions
Standard Mandarin
- Hanyu Pinyin: Dàjùyuàn Zhàn
Yue: Cantonese
- Jyutping: daai^{6}kek^{6}jyun^{2} zaam^{6}

General information
- Location: Zhujiang New Town, Tianhe District, Guangzhou, Guangdong; China
- Operated by: Guangzhou Metro Co. Ltd.
- Line: APM line
- Platforms: 2 (1 island platform)

Construction
- Structure type: Underground

Other information
- Station code: APM03

History
- Opened: 8 November 2010; 15 years ago

Services
Preceding station	Guangzhou Metro	Following station
Haixinsha towards Canton Tower	APM line	Huacheng Dadao towards Linhexi
Location

Guangzhou Opera House Station (Chinese: 大剧院站) is a metro station on the APM line of the Guangzhou Metro. It is located underground at the intersection of Huajiu Road (华就路), Zhujiang East Road (珠江东路) and Zhujiang West Road (珠江西路), to the northeast of Guangzhou Opera House and the northwest of the Guangdong Museum. It started operation on 8 November 2010.

== Station layout ==
G	-	Exits
L1	-	Parking lot of Huacheng Square
L2; Concourse	Lobby	Customer Service, Vending machines, ATMs
L3; Platforms	Platform 2	APM towards Canton Tower (Haixinsha)
L3; Platforms	Island platform, doors will open on the left
L3; Platforms	Platform 1	APM towards Linhexi (Huacheng Dadao)

== Exits ==
Exit number	Exit location
Exit B	Huacheng Square
Exit E	Huacheng Square
