= Huangpu Dadao station =

Guangzhou Metro station

Coordinates: 23°07′37″N 113°19′28″E

Huangpu Dadao 黄埔大道
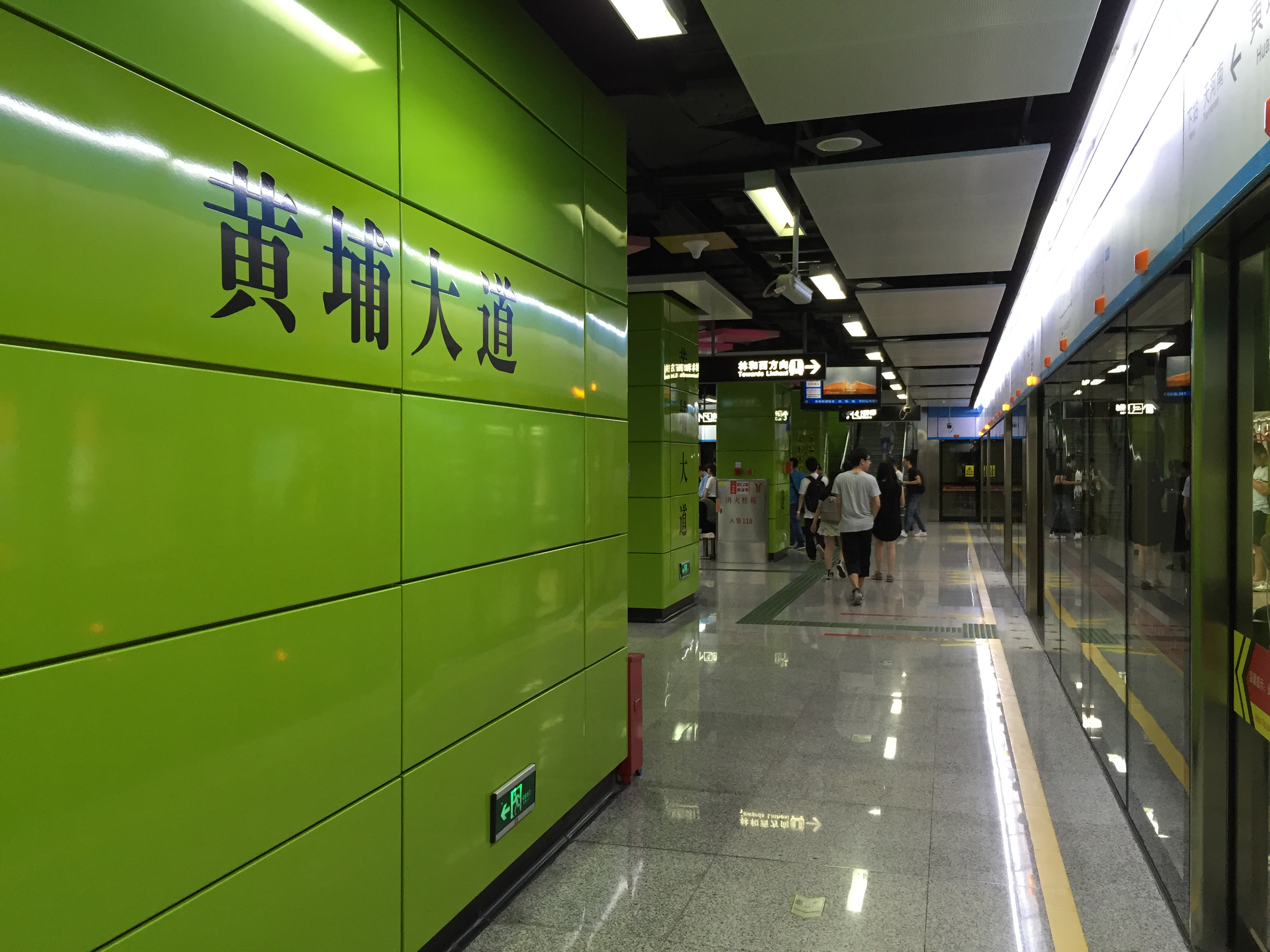

Chinese name
- Simplified Chinese: 黄埔大道站
- Traditional Chinese: 黃埔大道站
Transcriptions
Standard Mandarin
- Hanyu Pinyin: Huángpǔ Dàdào Zhàn
Yue: Cantonese
- Jyutping: wong^{4}bou^{3} daai^{6}dou^{6} zaam^{6}

General information
- Location: Zhujiang New Town, Tianhe District, Guangzhou, Guangdong; China
- Operated by: Guangzhou Metro Co. Ltd.
- Line: APM line
- Platforms: 2 (1 island platform)

Construction
- Structure type: Underground

Other information
- Station code: APM06

History
- Opened: 8 November 2010; 15 years ago

Services
Preceding station	Guangzhou Metro	Following station
Guangzhou Women and Children's Medical Center towards Canton Tower	APM line	Tianhenan towards Linhexi
Location

Huangpu Dadao station (Chinese: 黄埔大道站), literally Huangpu Avenue station, formerly Huangpu Avenue West station (黄埔大道西站) and Citizens' Square station (市民广场站), is a Guangzhou Metro APM line metro station in the Zhujiang New Town of Tianhe District. It is located at the underground of the West Huangpu Avenue, Zhujiang Road East, and Zhujiang Road West. It started operating on 8 November 2010.

== Station layout ==
G	-	Exit
L1	-	Mall of the World, Pedestrian subway
L2; Concourse	Lobby	Customer Service, Vending machines, ATMs
L3; Platforms	Platform 2	APM towards Canton Tower (Guangzhou Women and Children's Medical Center)
L3; Platforms	Island platform, doors will open on the left
L3; Platforms	Platform 1	APM towards Linhexi (Tianhenan)

== Exits ==
Exit number	Exit location
Exit A	Huangpu Dadaoxi
