= Huacheng Dadao station =

Guangzhou Metro station

Coordinates: 23°07′09″N 113°19′29″E

Huacheng Dadao 花城大道
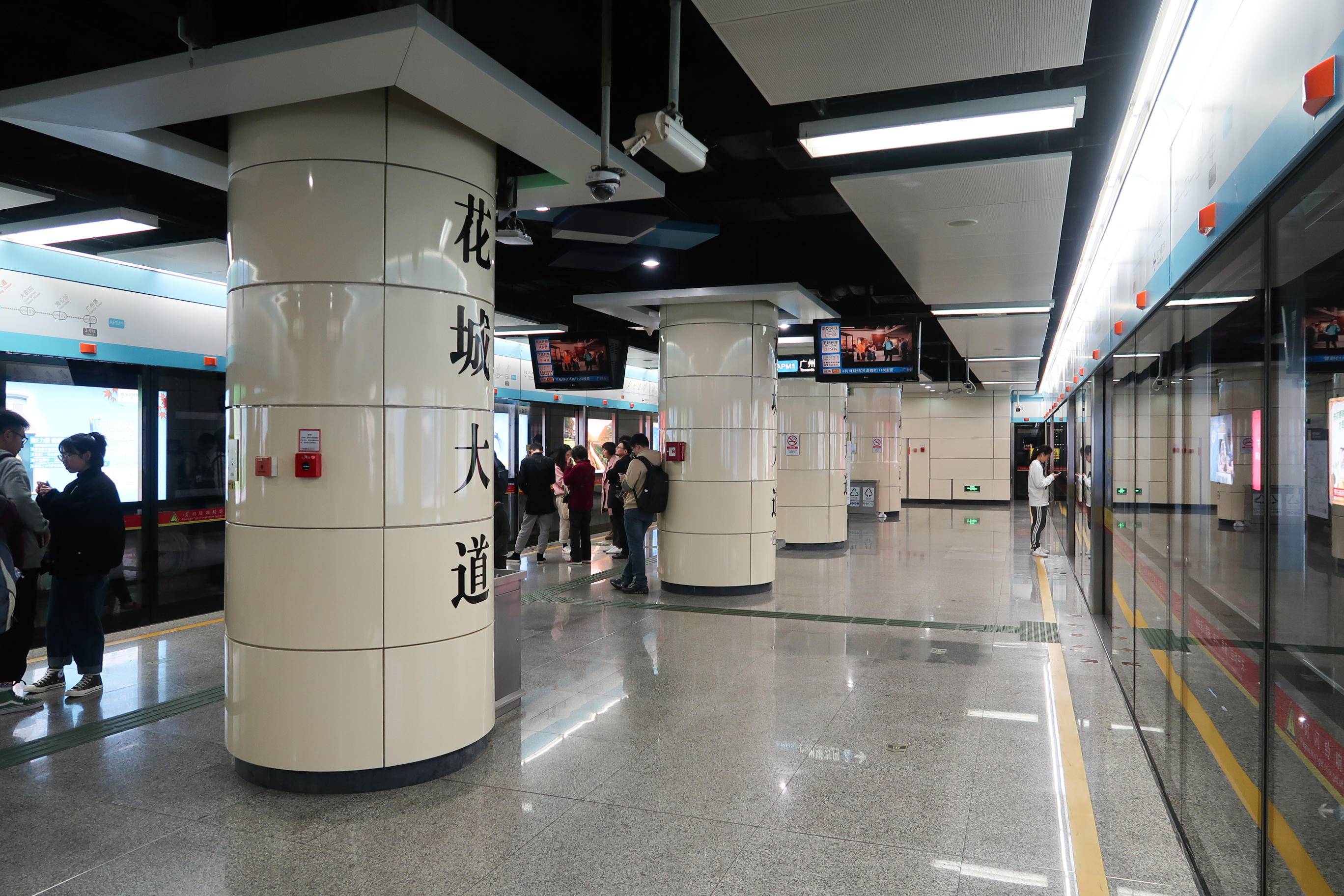

Chinese name
- Chinese: 花城大道站
- Literal meaning: Huacheng Avenue station
Transcriptions
Standard Mandarin
- Hanyu Pinyin: Huāchéng Dàdào Zhàn
Yue: Cantonese
- Jyutping: faa^{1}sing^{4} daai^{6}dou^{6} zaam^{6}

General information
- Location: Zhujiang New Town, Tianhe District, Guangzhou, Guangdong; China
- Operated by: Guangzhou Metro Co. Ltd.
- Line: APM line
- Platforms: 2 (1 island platform)

Construction
- Structure type: Underground

Other information
- Station code: APM04

Services
Preceding station	Guangzhou Metro	Following station
Guangzhou Opera House towards Canton Tower	APM line	Guangzhou Women and Children's Medical Center towards Linhexi
Location

Huacheng Dadao station (Chinese: 花城大道站; pinyin: Huāchéng Dàdào zhàn; lit. 'Huacheng Boulevard station'), formerly Shuangta station (Chinese: 双塔站; pinyin: Shuāngtǎ zhàn; lit. 'Twin Towers station'), is a metro station of the Guangzhou Metro APM line in the Zhujiang New Town of Tianhe District. It is located at the underground of the interchange of Huacheng Avenue, East Zhujiang Road, and West Zhujiang Road. It started operation on 8 November 2010.

== Station layout ==
G	-	Exits
-	-	Huacheng Avenue CBD Tunnel
L1; Commercial Zone	-	South Area of Mall of the World
L2; Concourse	Lobby	Customer Service, Vending machines, ATMs
L3; Platforms	Platform 2	APM towards Canton Tower (Guangzhou Opera House)
L3; Platforms	Island platform, doors will open on the left
L3; Platforms	Platform 1	APM towards Linhexi (Guangzhou Women and Children's Medical Center)
-	-	Tunnels of 5

== Exits ==
Exit number	Exit location
Exit A	Huacheng Dadao
Exit B	Zhujiang Dadao
