= Tianhenan station =

Guangzhou Metro station

Tianhenan 天河南
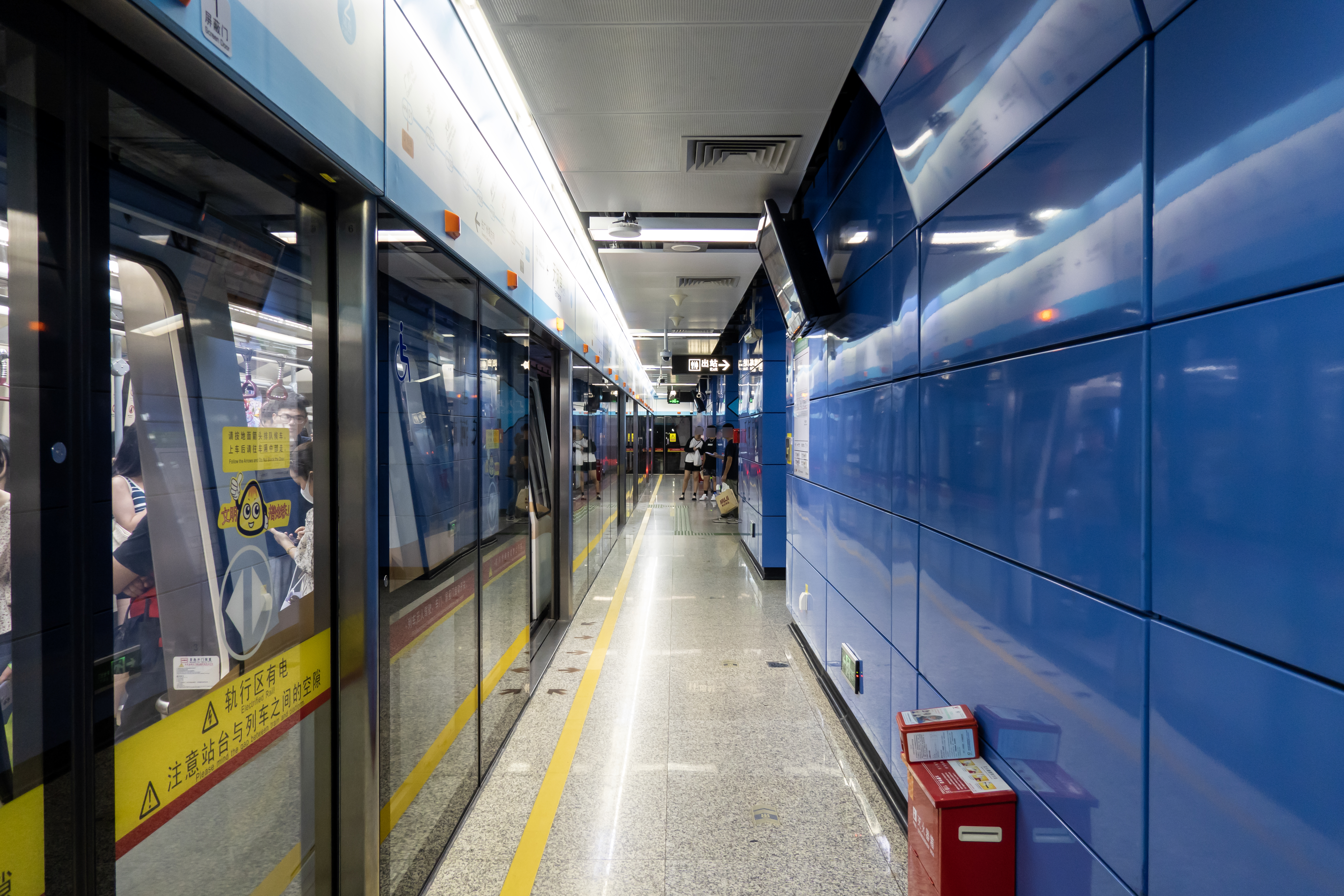

General information
- Location: Interchange of Tianhe 1st South Road (天河南一路) and Liuyun 2nd Street (六运二街); Tianhe District, Guangzhou, Guangdong; China
- Coordinates: 23.1313°N 113.3244°E
- Operated by: Guangzhou Metro Co. Ltd.
- Line: APM line
- Platforms: 2 (1 island platform)
- Tracks: 2
- Connections: 1 3 (both at Tiyu Xilu)

Construction
- Structure type: Underground
- Accessible: Yes

Other information
- Station code: APM07

History
- Opened: 8 November 2010; 15 years ago

Services
Preceding station	Guangzhou Metro	Following station
Huangpu Dadao towards Canton Tower	APM line	Tianhe Sports Center South towards Linhexi
Location

Tianhenan Station (Chinese: 天河南站; pinyin: Tiānhénán Zhàn; Jyutping: tin^{1}ho^{4}naam^{4} zaam^{6}), formerly Tianhe 1st Road South Station (天河南一路站) during planning, is a metro station on the Guangzhou Metro APM line in the Tianhe District of Guangzhou. It started operation on 8 November 2010. The station is unique in being the only Guangzhou Metro station with no escalator access to the platforms - instead 4 lifts carry passengers from the concourse to the platform, although there is a staircase for emergency use.

== Station layout ==
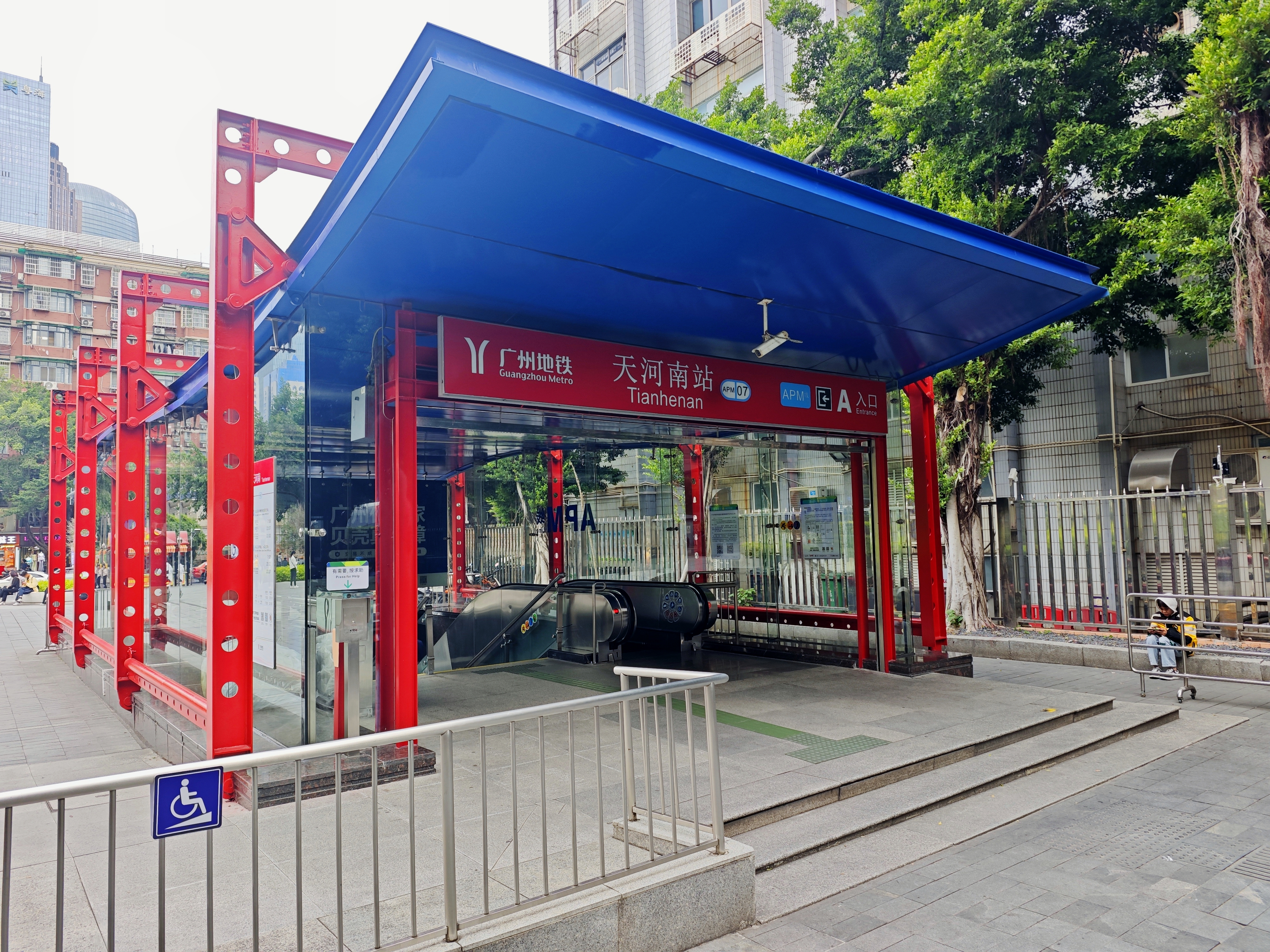
Tianhenan Station entrance/Exit A

G	-	Exit A
L1; Concourse	Lobby	Customer Service, Vending machines, ATMs
L2; Equipment Area	-	Station equipment
L3; Equipment Area	-	Station equipment
L4; Platforms	Platform 2	APM towards Canton Tower (Huangpu Dadao)
L4; Platforms	Island platform, doors will open on the left
L4; Platforms	Platform 1	APM towards Linhexi (Tianhe Sports Center South)

== Exits ==
Exit number	Exit location
Exit A	Tianhe Nanyilu
