= Tianhe Sports Center station =

Guangzhou Metro station

Coordinates: 23.13497°N 113.328376°E

Tianhe Sports Center 体育中心
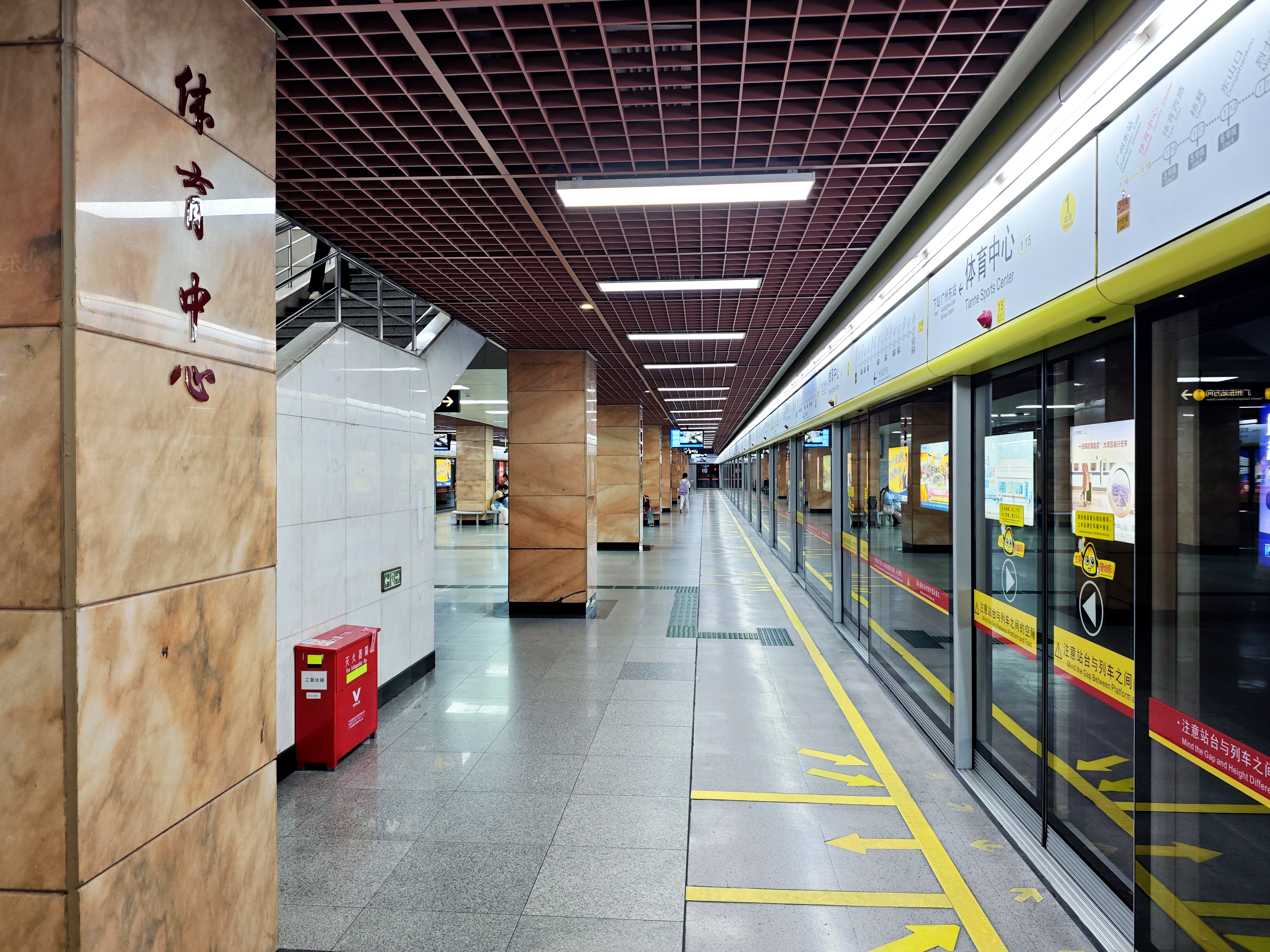

Chinese name
- Simplified Chinese: 体育中心站
- Traditional Chinese: 體育中心站
Transcriptions
Standard Mandarin
- Hanyu Pinyin: Tǐyù Zhōngxīn Zhàn
Yue: Cantonese
- Jyutping: tai^{2}juk^{6} zung^{1}sam^{1} zaam^{6}

General information
- Location: East Tiyu Road (体育东路) and Tianhe Road (天河路); Tianhe District, Guangzhou, Guangdong; China
- Operated by: Guangzhou Metro Co. Ltd.
- Line: Line 1
- Platforms: 2 (1 island platform)

Construction
- Structure type: Underground

Other information
- Station code: 115

History
- Opened: June 28, 1999; 26 years ago

Services
Preceding station	Guangzhou Metro	Following station
Tiyu Xilu towards Xilang	Line 1	Guangzhou East Railway Station Terminus
Location

Tianhe Sports Center Station (simplified Chinese: 体育中心站; traditional Chinese: 體育中心站; Jyutping: tai2 juk6 zung1 sam1 zaam6; Cantonese Yale: Táiyuhk Jūngsām Jaahm) is a station on Line 1 of the Guangzhou Metro that started operations on 28 June 1999. It is situated under Tiyu East Road (体育东路) next to the Tianhe Sports Center in the Tianhe District, near Guangzhou Computer Town (广州电脑城).

== Station layout ==
G	-	Exit
L1; Concourse	Lobby	Customer Service, Shops, Vending machines, ATMs
L2; Platforms	Platform 2	1 towards Xilang (Tiyu Xilu)
L2; Platforms	Island platform, doors will open on the left
L2; Platforms	Platform 1	1 towards Guangzhou East Railway Station (Terminus)

== Exits ==
Exit number		Exit location
Exit A		Tiyu Donglu
Exit B		Tiyu Donglu
Exit C		Tiyu Donglu
Exit D	D1	Tiyu Donglu
Exit D	D2	Tiyu Donglu
Exit D	D3	Tianhe Lu

== See also ==
- Tianhe Sports Center South station, a nearby Guangzhou Metro APM line metro station, 200m away
