= Tianhe Sports Center South station =

Guangzhou Metro station

Coordinates: 23.1343°N 113.3242°E

Tianhe Sports Center South 体育中心南
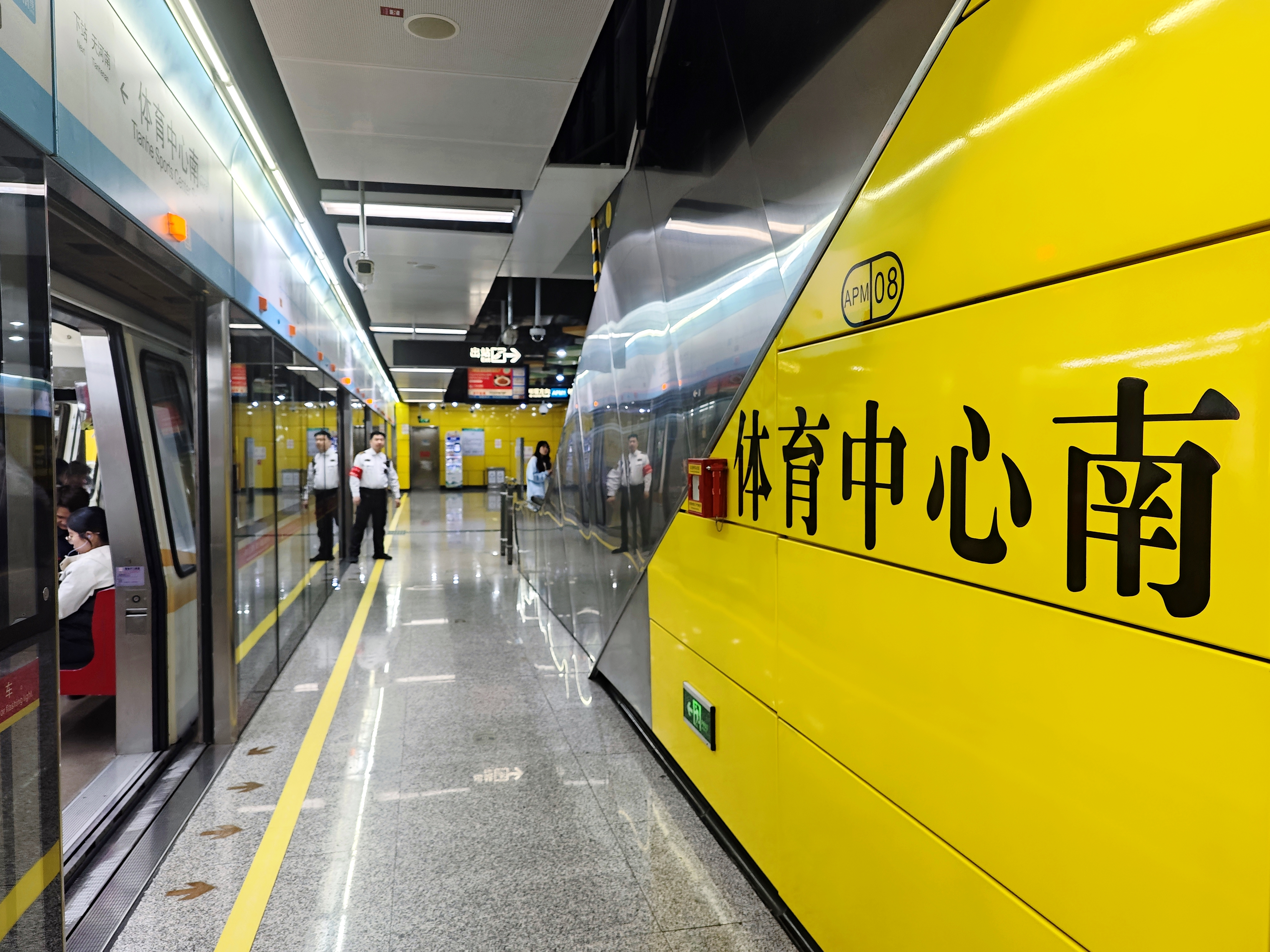
- Platform 2

General information
- Location: Tianhe Sports Center, Tianhe District, Guangzhou, Guangdong; China
- Operated by: Guangzhou Metro Co. Ltd.
- Line: APM line
- Platforms: 2 (1 island platform)

Construction
- Structure type: Underground

Other information
- Station code: APM08

History
- Opened: 8 November 2010; 15 years ago

Services
Preceding station	Guangzhou Metro	Following station
Tianhenan towards Canton Tower	APM line	Linhexi Terminus
Location

Tianhe Sports Center South Station (Chinese: 体育中心南站; pinyin: Tǐyù Zhōngxīn Nán Zhàn; Jyutping: tai^{2}juk^{6} zung^{1}sam^{1} naam^{4} zaam^{6}) is a metro station on the Guangzhou Metro APM line. It is located below the entrance to the Tianhe Sports Center (天河体育中心) in Tianhe Road (天河路) in the Tianhe District, 200 metres (660 ft) from Tianhe Sports Center station on Line 1 of the metro. It started operation on 8 November 2010.

== Station layout ==
G	-	Exit
L1; Concourse	Lobby	Customer Service, Vending machines, ATMs
L2; Platforms	Platform 2	APM towards Canton Tower (Tianhenan)
L2; Platforms	Island platform, doors will open on the left
L2; Platforms	Platform 1	APM towards Linhexi (terminus)

== Gallery ==
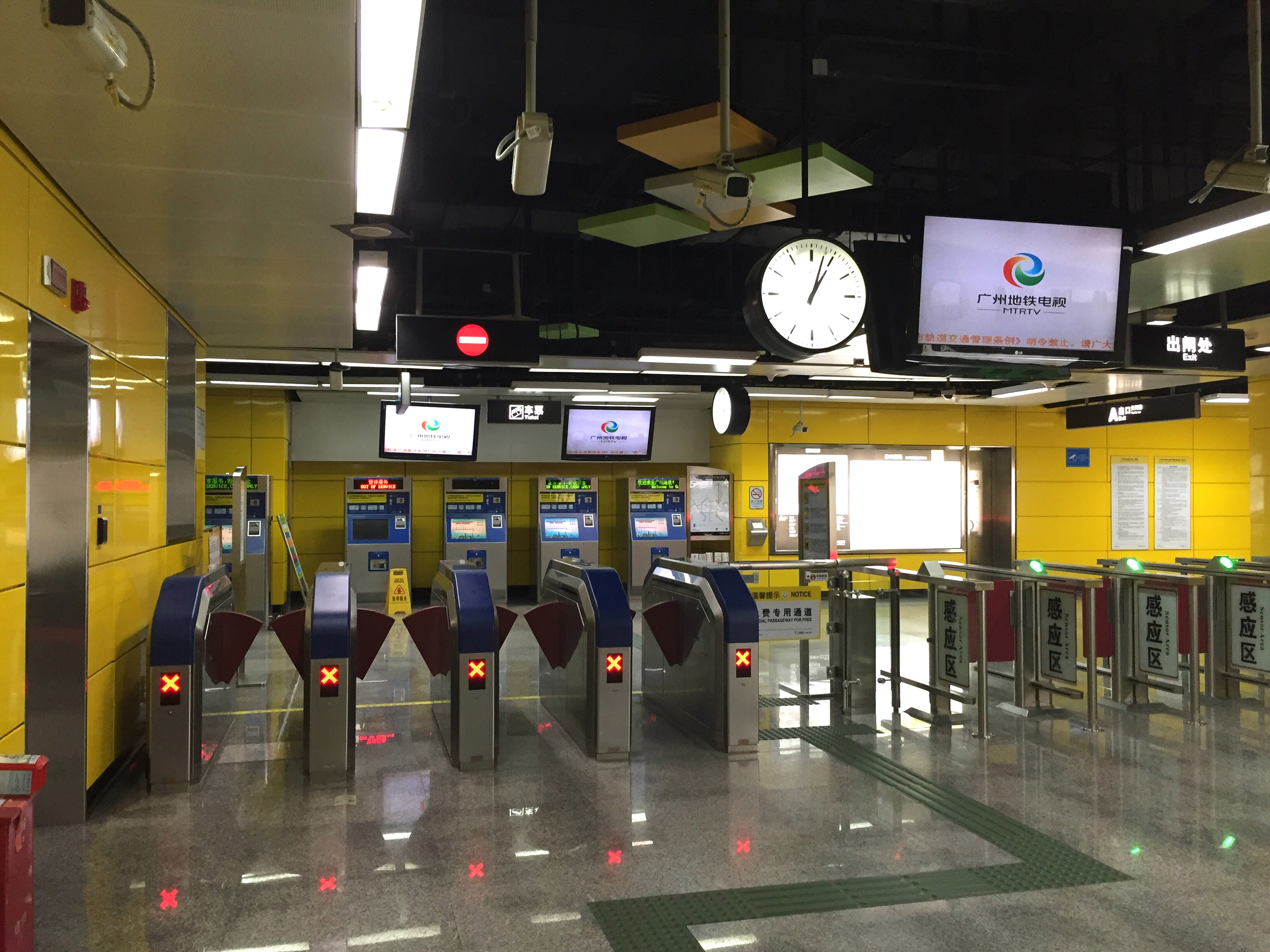
Concourse

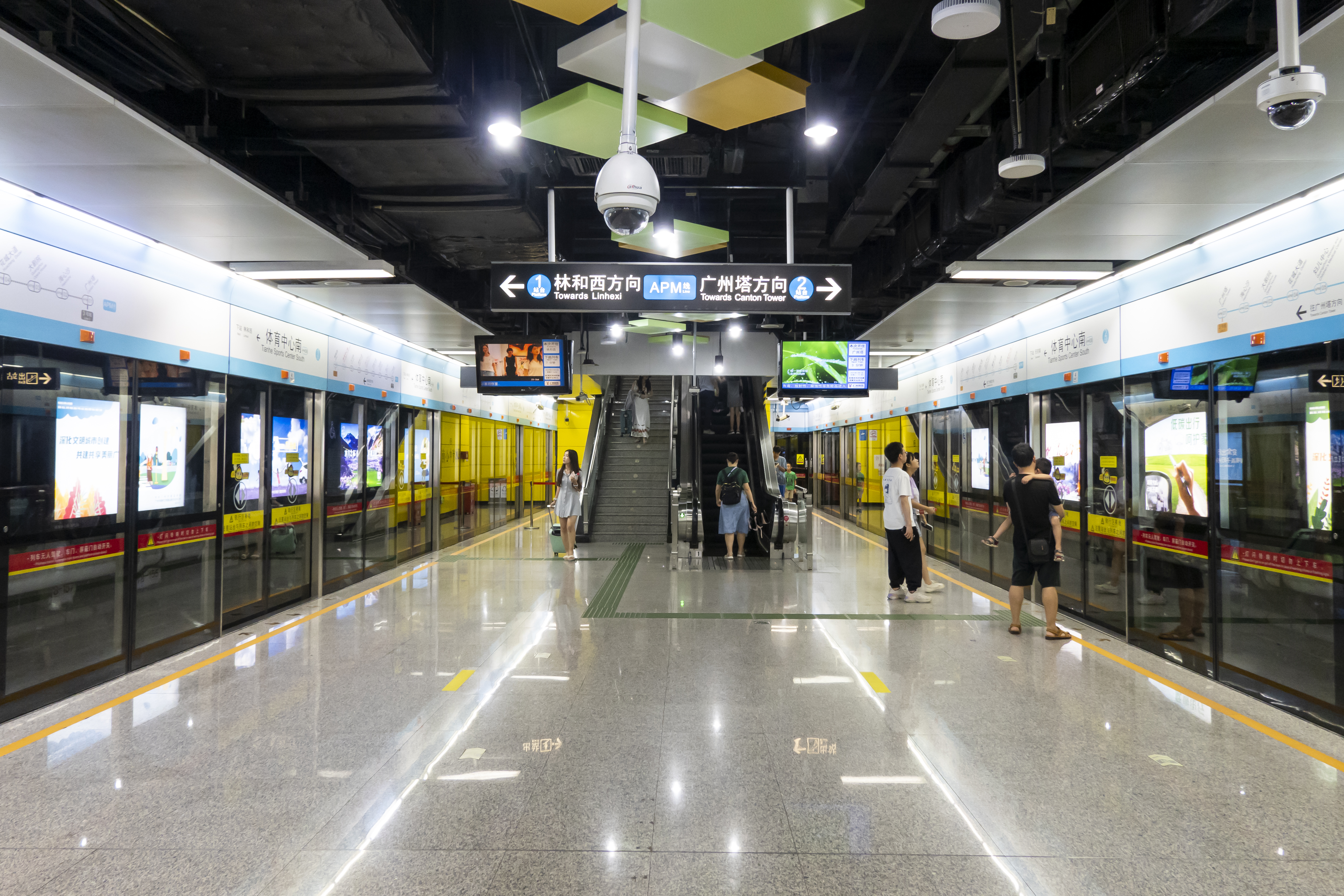
Platforms

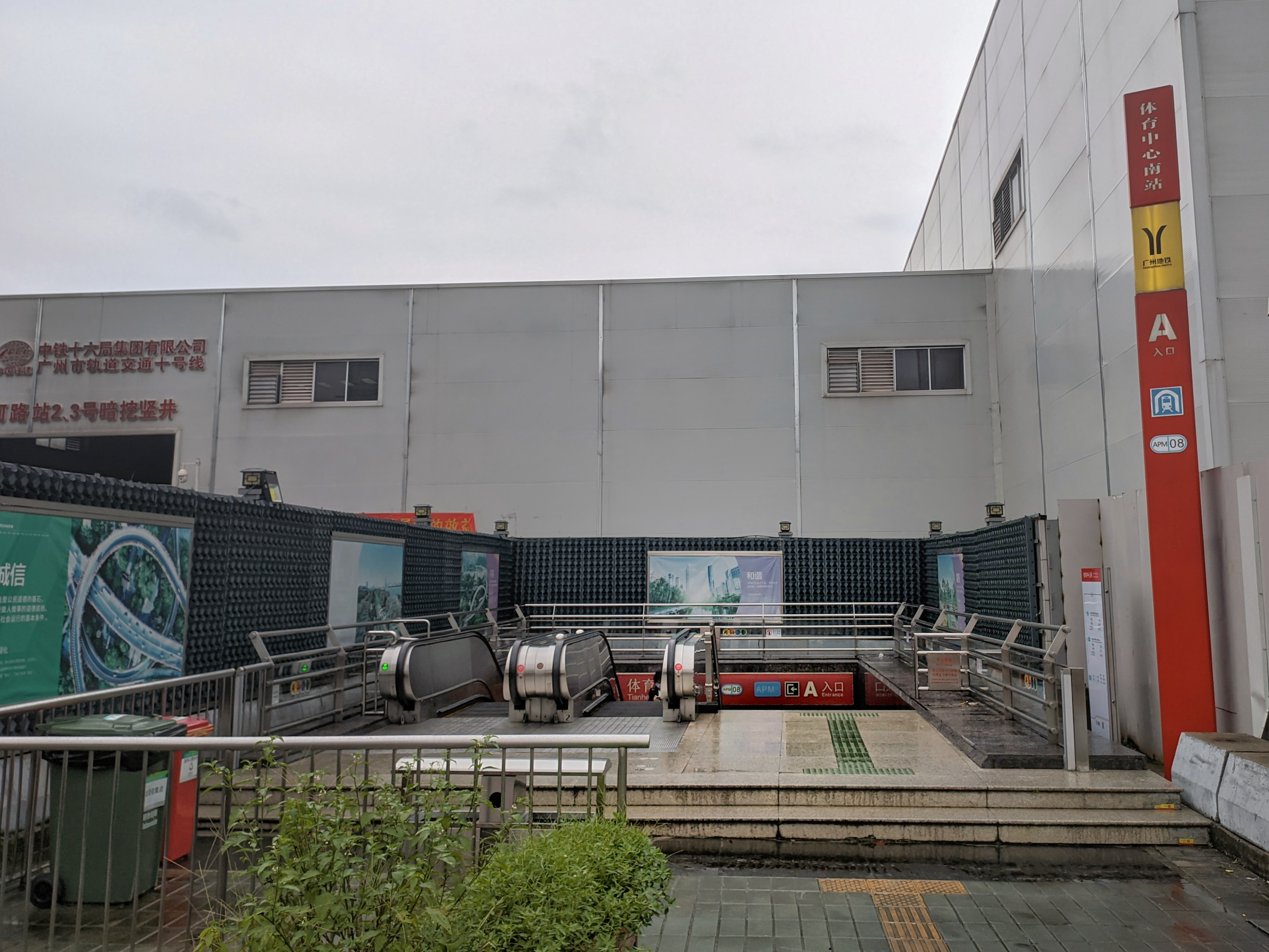
Exit A

== Exits ==
Exit number	Exit location
Exit A	Tianhe Road
