= Haixinsha station =

Guangzhou Metro station

Coordinates: 23°06′42″N 113°19′28″E

Haixinsha 海心沙
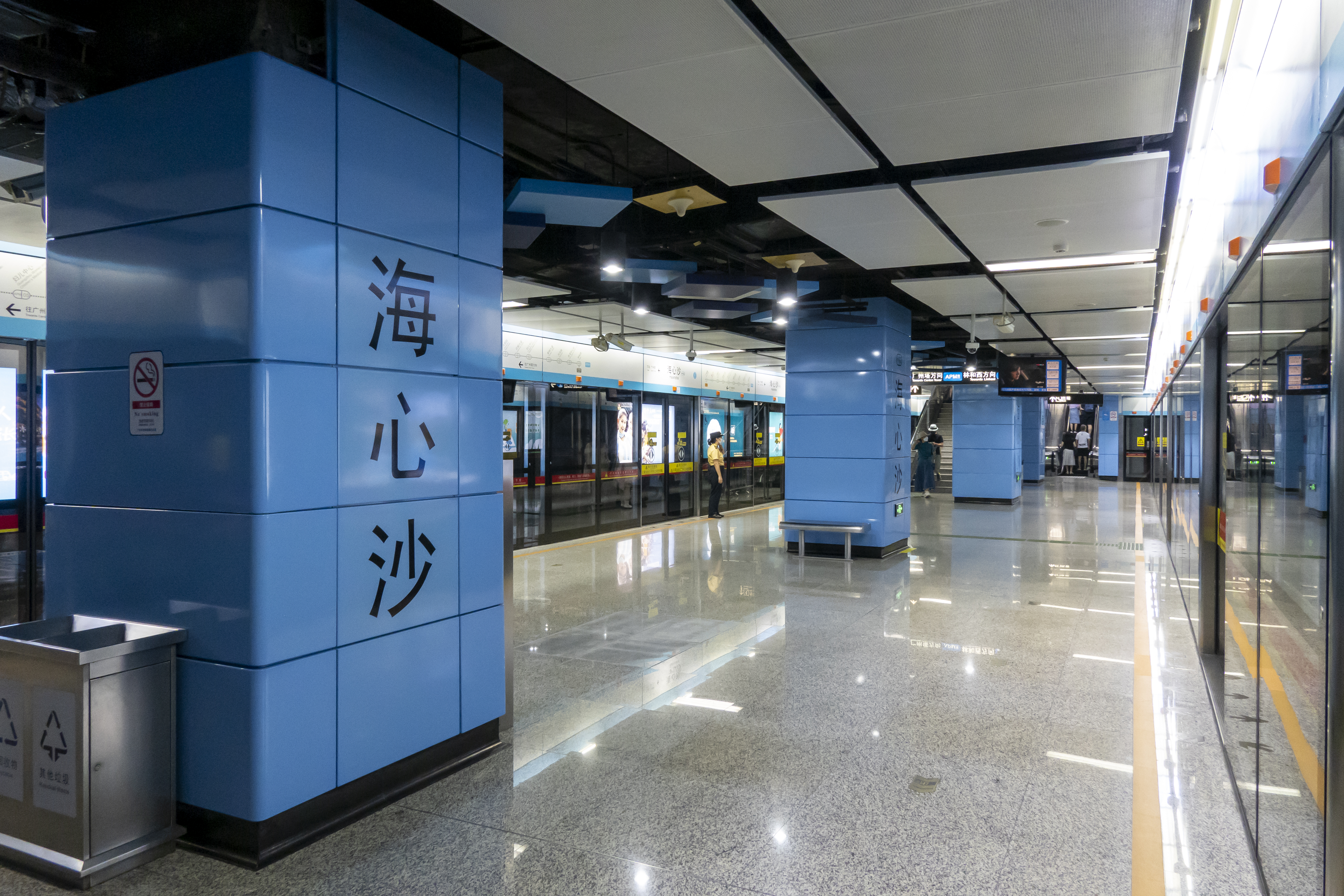

General information
- Location: Haixinsha Island, Tianhe District, Guangzhou, Guangdong; China
- Operated by: Guangzhou Metro Co. Ltd.
- Line: APM line
- Platforms: 2 (1 island platform)

Construction
- Structure type: Underground

Other information
- Station code: APM02

History
- Opened: 24 February 2011; 15 years ago

Services
Preceding station	Guangzhou Metro	Following station
Canton Tower Terminus	APM line	Guangzhou Opera House towards Linhexi
Location

Haixinsha Station (Chinese: 海心沙站; pinyin: Hǎixīnshā Zhàn; Jyutping: hoi^{2}sam^{1}saa^{1} zaam^{6}) is a metro station of the Guangzhou Metro APM line. It is located at the underground of Haixinsha Island, venue of the opening and closing ceremonies of the 2010 Asian Games. It started operation on 24 February 2011, three months after the games ended.

== Station layout ==
G	-	Exit
L1	-	Underground hall of Haixinsha Park
L2; Concourse	Lobby	Customer Service, Vending machines, ATMs
L3; Buffer Area	-	Buffer area between Lobby and Platforms, Station equipment
L4; Platforms	Platform 2	APM towards Canton Tower (terminus)
L4; Platforms	Island platform, doors will open on the left
L4; Platforms	Platform 1	APM towards Linhexi (Guangzhou Opera House)

== Exits ==
Exit number	Exit location
Exit A	Haixinsha Asian Games Park
