= Tiyu Xilu station =

Guangzhou Metro interchange station

Tiyu Xilu 体育西路
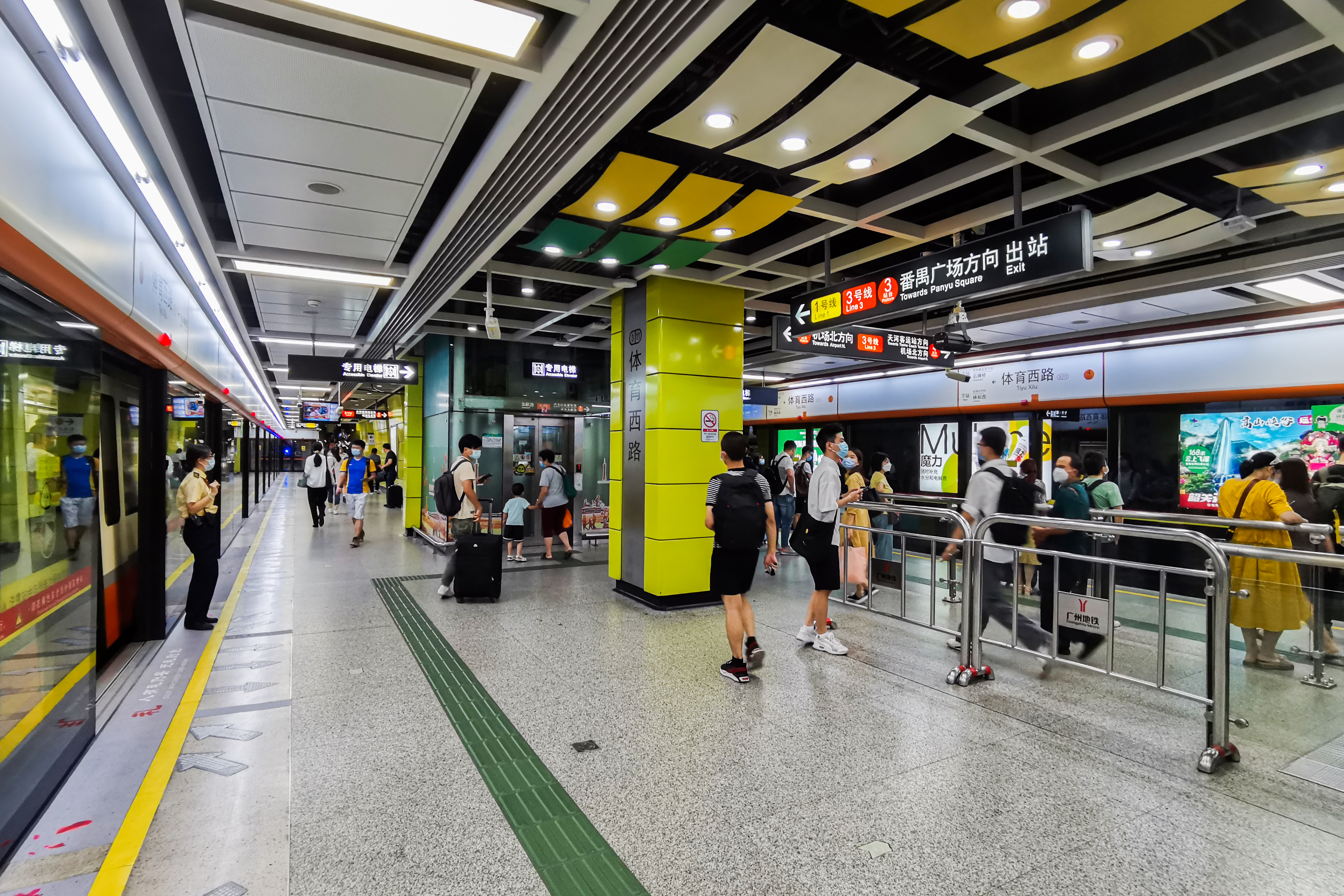
- Line 3 platform

Chinese name
- Simplified Chinese: 体育西路站
- Traditional Chinese: 體育西路站
- Literal meaning: Sports (Center) West Road station
Transcriptions
Standard Mandarin
- Hanyu Pinyin: Tǐyù Xīlù Zhàn
Yue: Cantonese
- Yale Romanization: Táiyuhk Sāilouh Jaahm
- Jyutping: Tai^{2}juk^{6} Sai^{1}lou^{6} Zaam^{6}
- Hong Kong Romanization: Tai Yuk West Road station

General information
- Location: Tianhe 1st South Road (天河南一路) and West Tiyu Road (体育西路); Tianhe District, Guangzhou, Guangdong; China
- Coordinates: 23.1315°N 113.3210°E
- Operated by: Guangzhou Metro Co. Ltd.
- Lines: Line 1; Line 3
- Platforms: 6 (3 island platforms)
- Tracks: 5
- Connections: APM (Tianhenan); 10 (Tianhe Road, future)

Construction
- Structure type: Underground
- Accessible: Yes

Other information
- Station code: 114 311

History
- Opened: 28 June 1999; 26 years ago (Line 1); 26 December 2005; 20 years ago (Line 3)

Services
Preceding station	Guangzhou Metro	Following station
Yangji towards Xilang	Line 1	Tianhe Sports Center towards Guangzhou East Railway Station
Zhujiang New Town towards Haibang	Line 3	Linhexi towards Airport North (Terminal 2)
Zhujiang New Town towards Haibang	Line 3	Shipaiqiao towards Tianhe Coach Terminal
Future services
Yangji East towards Xilang	Line 10 Transfer at Tianhe Road	Shipaiqiao towards Tianhe Coach Terminal
Location

Tiyu Xilu Station (simplified Chinese: 体育西路站; traditional Chinese: 體育西路站; Jyutping: tai^{2} juk^{6} sai^{1} lou^{6} zaam^{6}; Cantonese Yale: Táiyuhk Sāilouh Jaahm; lit. 'Sports (Center) West Road station') is an interchange station between Line 1 and Line 3 of the Guangzhou Metro. It started operations on 28 June 1999 (for Line 1) and 26 December 2005 (for Line 3). It is situated under Tiyu Road West (体育西路) and Tianhe 1st South Road (天河南一路) in the Tianhe District of Guangzhou. It is near Teemall (天河城广场) and Guangzhou Books Center (广州购书中心), which makes it one of the busiest metro stations in Guangzhou.

The station was designated as busiest in the country by a fair margin with 1,252,064 passengers per day in 2017.

== Station layout ==
G
Street level
Exits A-D, G, H
L1
Concourse
Lobby
Ticket Machines, Customer Service, Shops, Police Station, Safety Facilities
Pedestrian Passageway
Exit E
L2
Platforms
Platform 2
1 towards Xilang (Yangji)
Island platform, doors will open on the left
Platform 1
1 towards Guangzhou East Railway Station (Tianhe Sports Center)
L3
Platforms
Platform 3
3 towards Haibang (Zhujiang New Town)
Island platform, doors will open on the left (towards Haibang) or right (towards Airport North)
Platform 5 ↑
Platform 6 ↓
3 towards Airport North (Linhexi)
Island platform, doors will open on the left (towards Airport North) or right (towards Airport North or Tianhe Coach Terminal)
Platform 4
3 towards

Tianhe Coach Terminal (Shipaiqiao)

Airport North (Linhexi)

The track layout on Line 3 through this station is very complex. Line 3 branches immediately north of the station, with a branch to Airport North (referred to as Line 3 North), along with the mainline to Tianhe Coach Terminal. There is also a middle turnback with a platform on both sides.

Trains coming from the south enter platform 4 and can continue to either Airport North or Tianhe Coach Terminal. Trains from both Tianhe Coach Terminal and Airport North enter on platform 3 and continue south. As there is insufficient capacity with the two branches combining, some trains from Airport North terminate using the middle track and return to Airport North. There are platforms on both sides of the middle track to allow easy cross-platform interchange for passengers transferring to/from these trains.

== Exits ==
Exit number	Exit location
Exit A	Tiyu Xilu
Exit B	Tianhe Nanyilu
Exit C	Tianhe Nanyilu
Exit D	Tiyu Xilu
Exit E	Tianhe Festival Walk
Exit G	Tiyu Xilu
Exit H	Tiyu Xilu

== Gallery ==
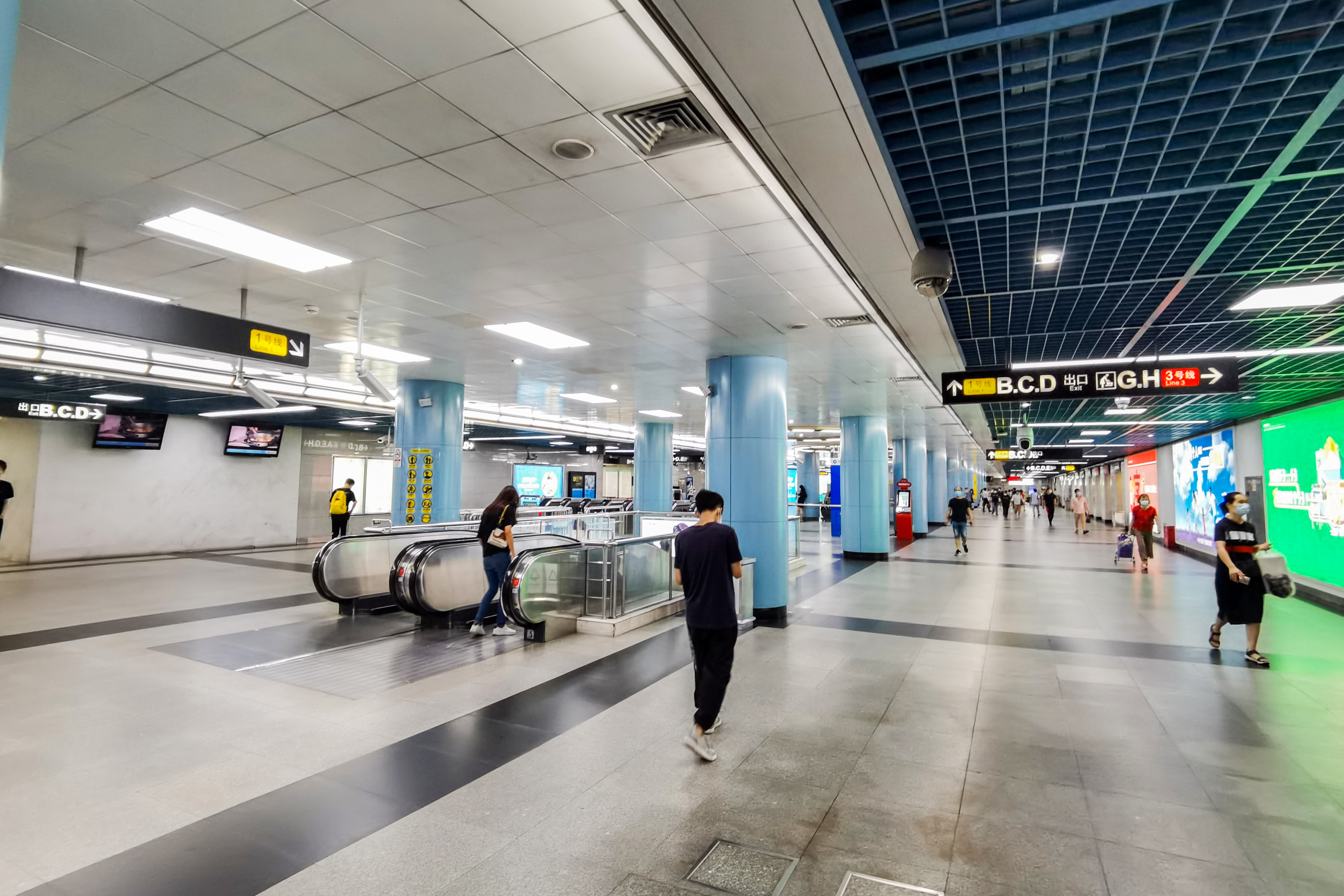
Line 1 concourse

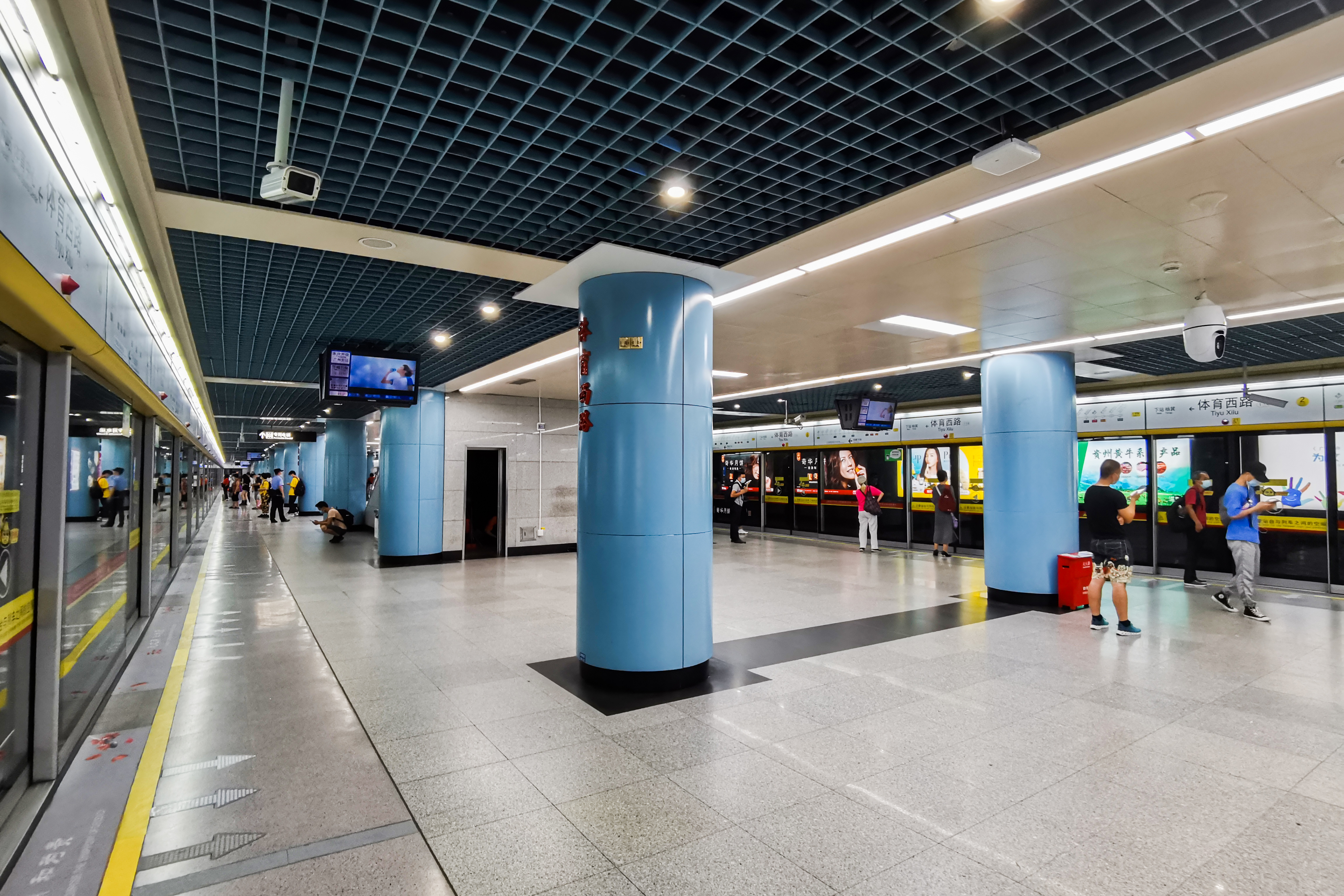
Line 1 platform

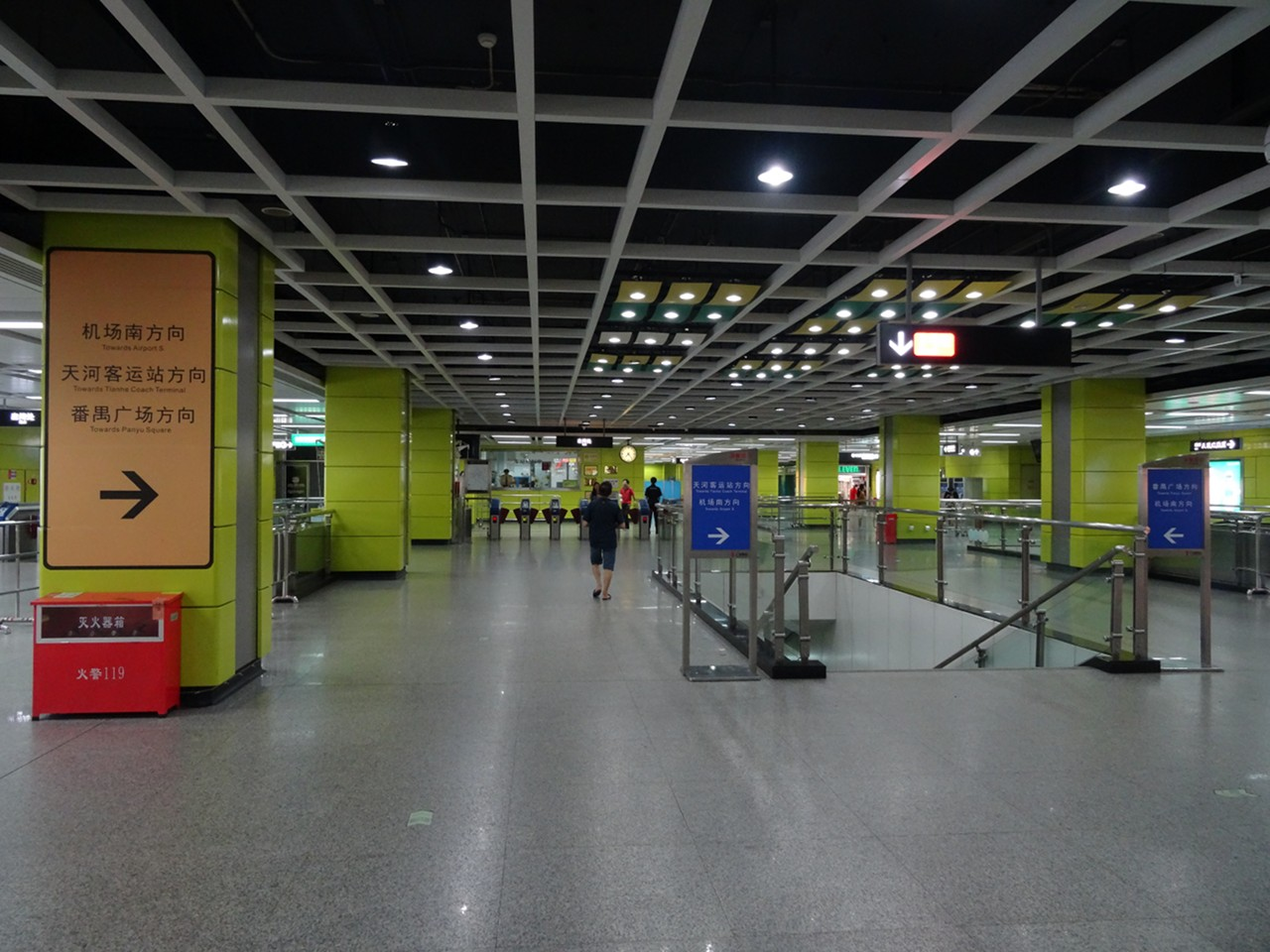
Line 3 concourse

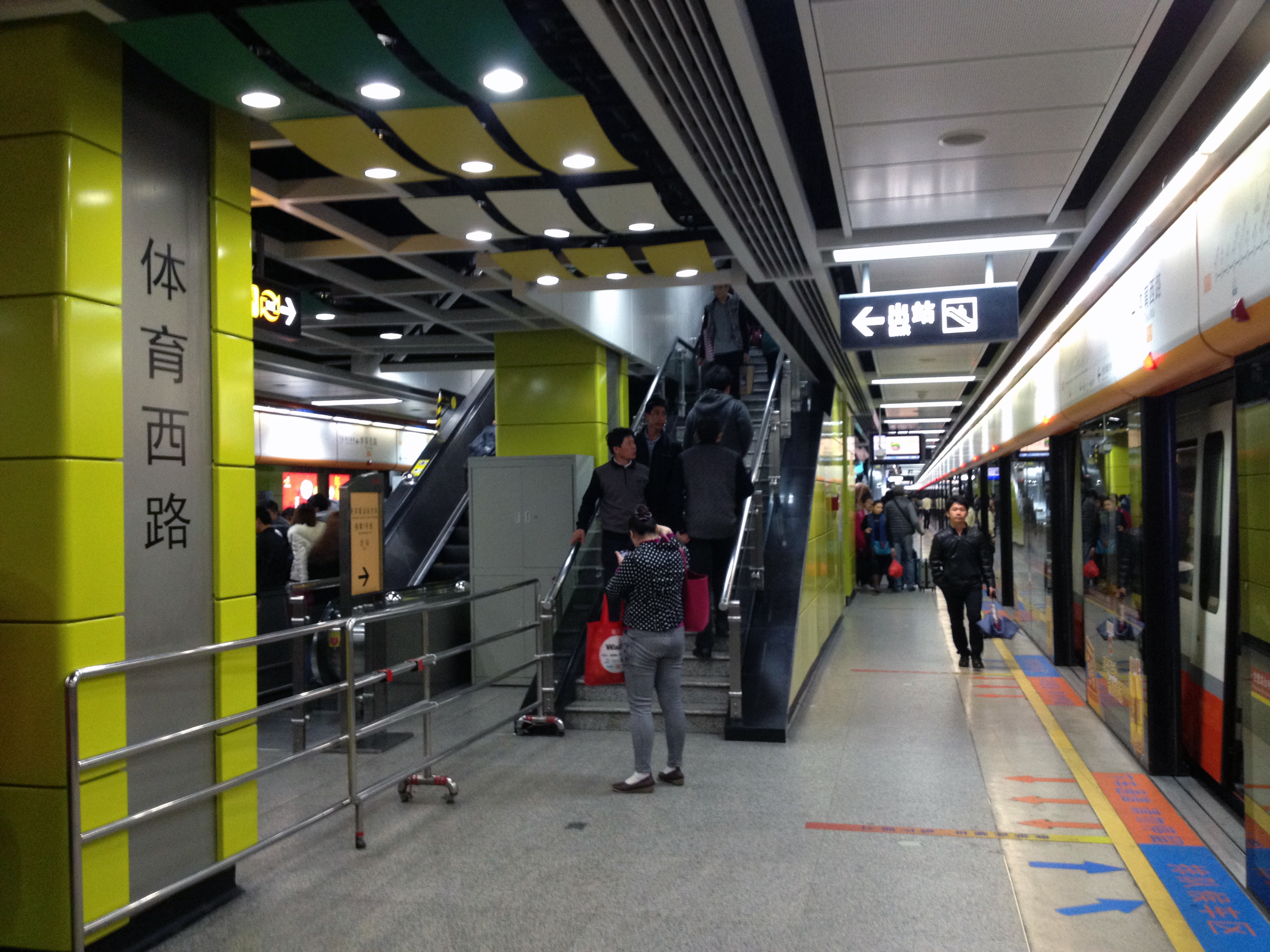
Platform 5 (Line 3 west side platform towards Airport North)

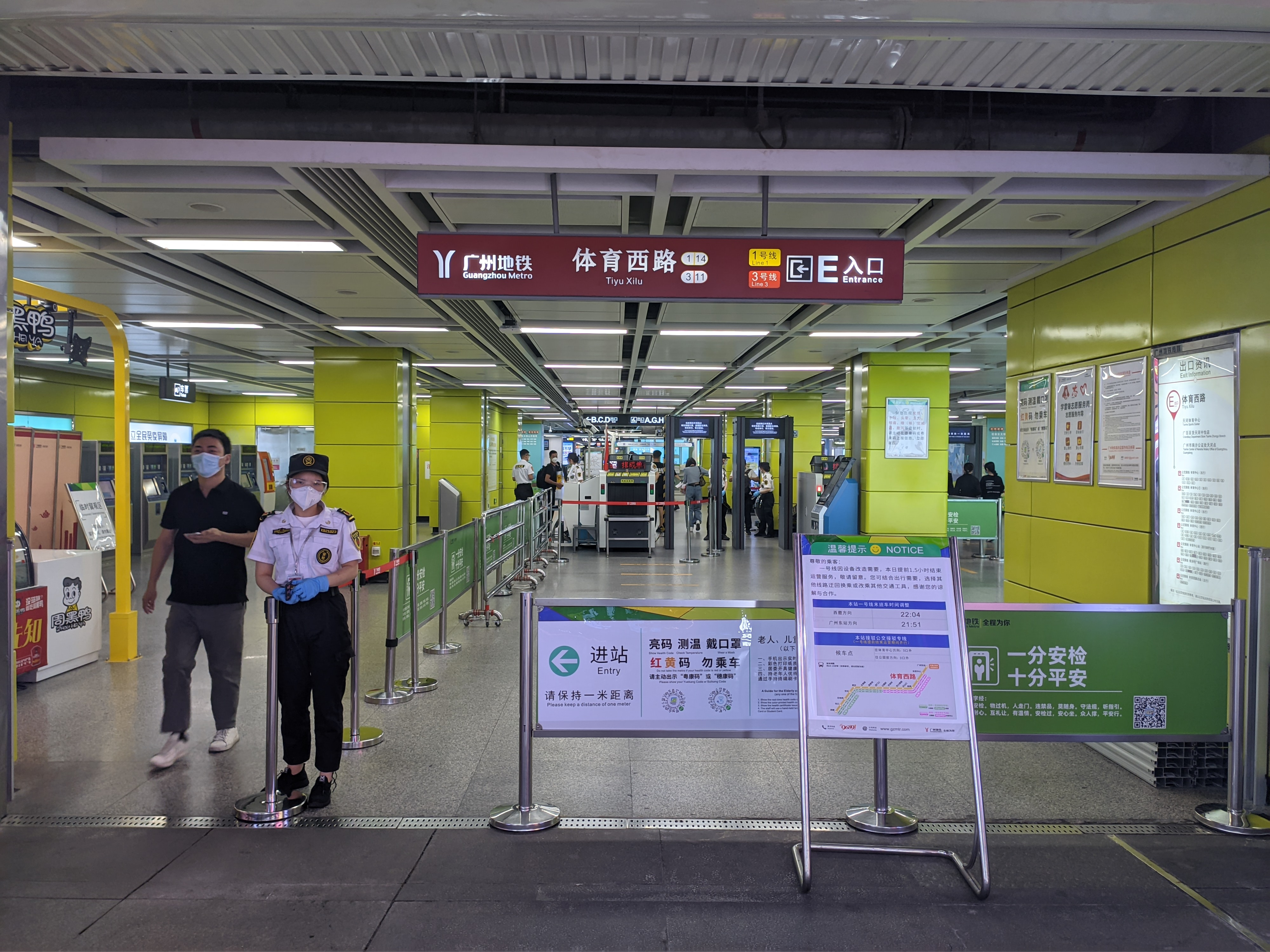
Exit E
