= Zhujiang New Town Automated People Mover System =

APM line of the Guangzhou Metro in Zhujiang New Town

APM line

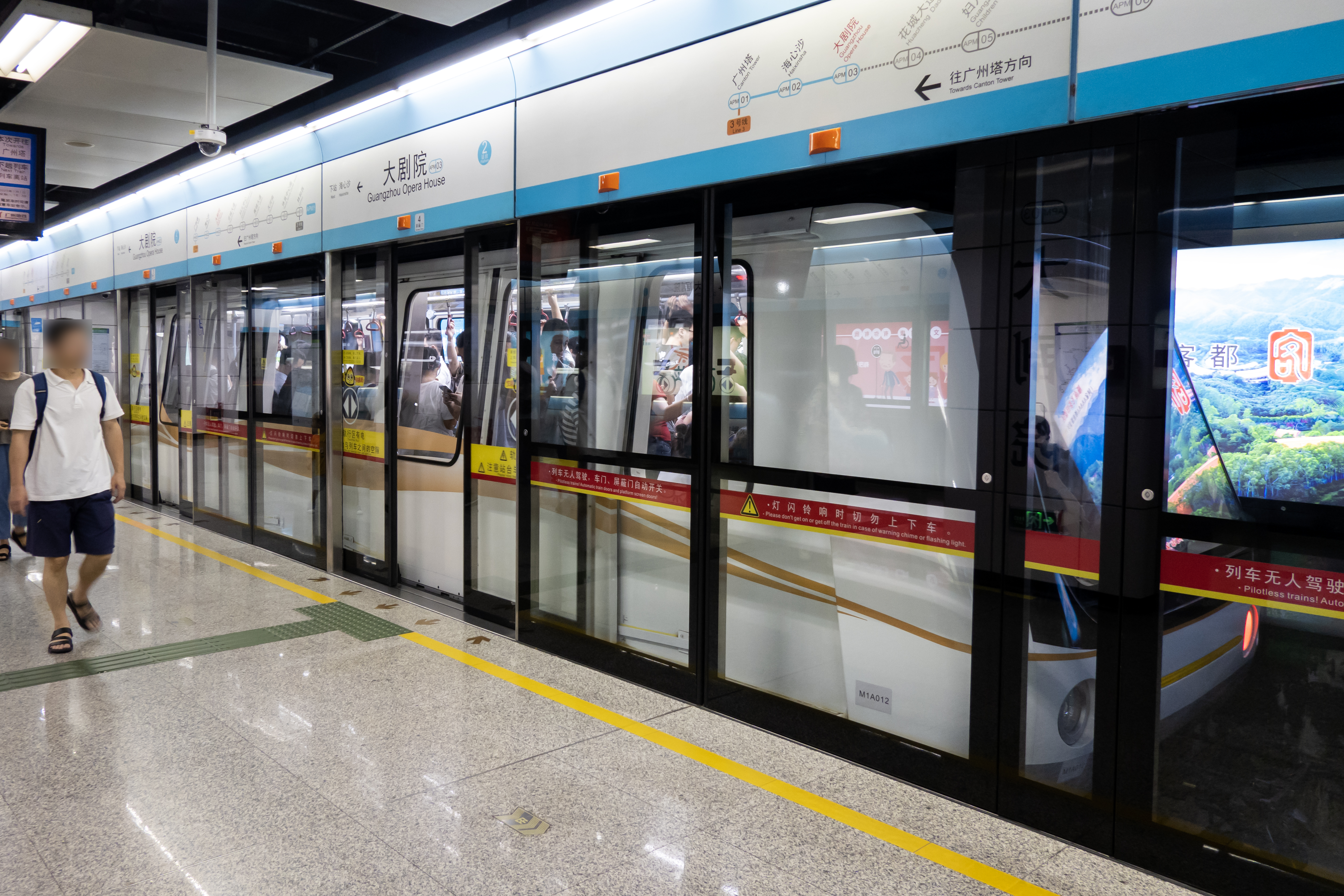
- A Guangzhou APM line train at Guangzhou Opera House

Overview
- Status: Operational
- Owner: City of Guangzhou
- Locale: Haizhu and Tianhe districts Guangzhou, Guangdong
- Termini: Canton Tower; Linhexi
- Stations: 9

Service
- Type: People mover
- System: Guangzhou Metro
- Services: 1
- Operator: Guangzhou Metro Corporation
- Daily ridership: 40,300 (2025 daily average)

History
- Opened: 8 November 2010; 15 years ago

Technical
- Line length: 3.9 km (2.42 mi)
- Number of tracks: 2
- Character: Underground
- Track gauge: 2,642 mm (8 ft 8 in) central guideway with rubber tyres
- Electrification: Third rail, 3-phase, 600 V 50 Hz AC
- Operating speed: 55 km/h (34 mph)

Zhujiang New Town Automated People Mover System
- Simplified Chinese: 珠江新城旅客自动输送系统
- Traditional Chinese: 珠江新城旅客自動輸送系統
Transcriptions
Standard Mandarin
- Hanyu Pinyin: Zhūjiāng Xīnchéng Lǚkè Zìdòng Shūsòng Xìtǒng
Yue: Cantonese
- Jyutping: zyu^{1}gong^{1} san^{1}sing^{4} leoi^{5}haak^{3} zi^{6}dung^{6} syu^{1}sung^{3} hai^{6}tung^{2}

The Zhujiang New Town Automated People Mover System (Chinese: 珠江新城旅客自动输送系统) or APM line of the Guangzhou Metro is an automated people mover (APM) system mainly serving the Zhujiang New Town area in Guangzhou, the new CBD of the city. The line is fully underground. In terms of construction cost per kilometre, it is the most expensive people mover system in the world, yet it is the shortest and least used line in the Guangzhou Metro network. The APM line began service before the Asian Games on 8 November 2010 with the exception of Haixinsha and Canton Tower. This was due to the two stations being located close to the opening ceremony venue.

== Opening timeline ==
| Segment | Commencement | Length | Station(s) | Name |
|---|---|---|---|---|
| Canton Tower — Linhexi | 8 November 2010 | 4.0 km (2.49 mi) | 8 | (initial phase) |
| Haixinsha | 24 February 2011 | Infill station | 1 | |

== Fares ==
The APM Line is the first and only line of Guangzhou Metro system uses a flat fare rate as of March 2026. One ride costs 2 RMB regardless of the distance. The APM line has an independent fare system, so it is necessary to buy another ticket to transfer between the APM line and other Guangzhou Metro lines.

== Lengths and stations ==
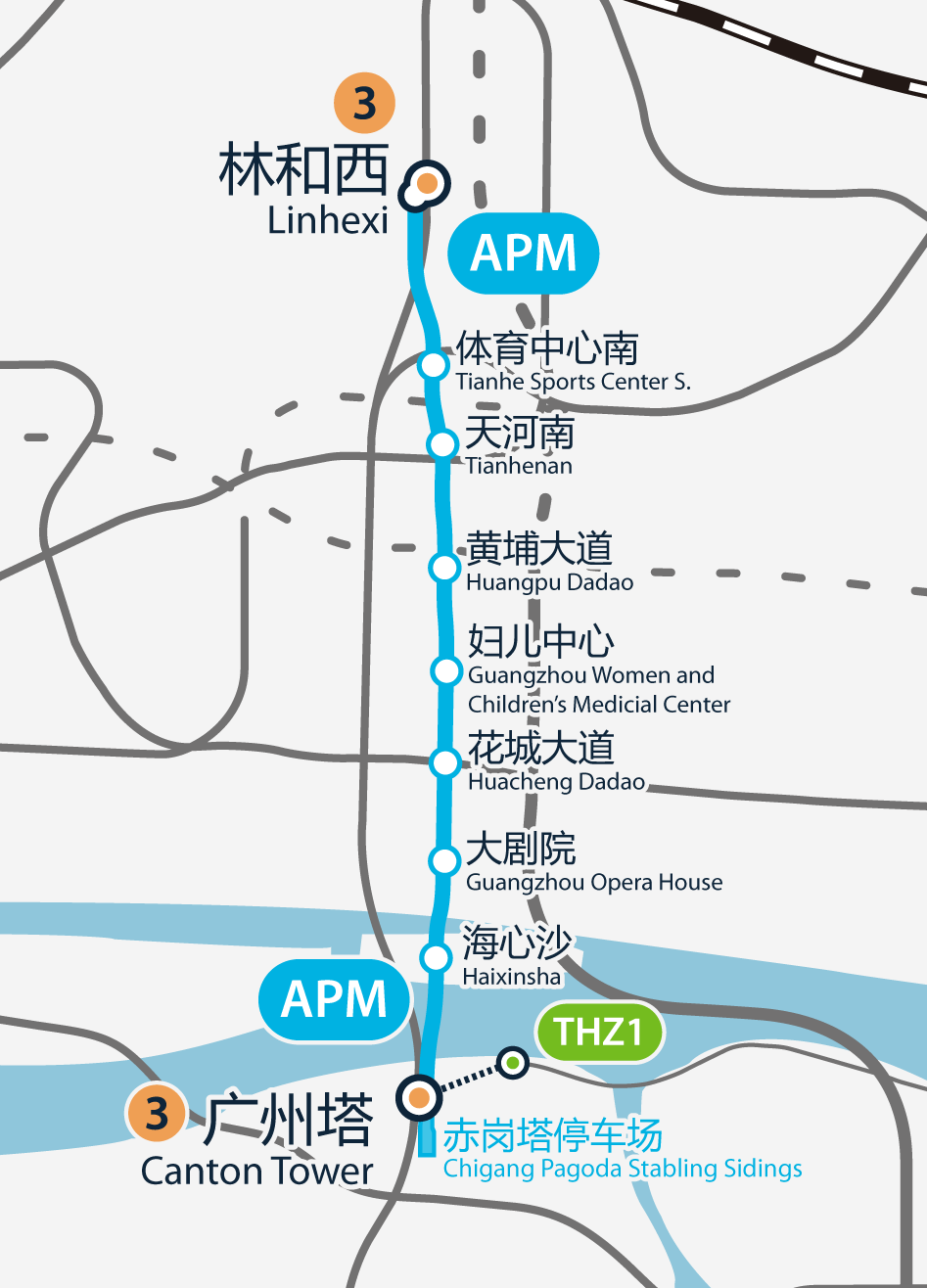
Map of Zhujiang New Town APM line

The entire track of the Zhujiang New Town APM is 3.49 km (2.17 mi) long, and all nine stations are laid underground, making it the first all underground urban people mover in the world. The shortest distance between two stations is 315 metres (1,033 ft) with an average of the entire line approximating 473 metres (1,552 ft).

=== Stations ===
- OSI - Out-of-station interchange (only available for IC cards users)

| Station No. | Station name | | Connections | Distance km | | Location |
| Station No. | English | Chinese | Connections | Distance km | | Location |
|---|---|---|---|---|---|---|
| APM01 | Canton Tower | 广州塔 | 3 309 THZ1 THZ101 | 0.00 | 0.00 | Haizhu |
| APM02 | Haixinsha | 海心沙 | | 0.69 | 0.69 | Tianhe |
| APM03 | Guangzhou Opera House | 大剧院 | | 0.47 | 1.16 | Tianhe |
| APM04 | Huacheng Dadao | 花城大道 | | 0.39 | 1.55 | Tianhe |
| APM05 | Guangzhou Women and Children's Medical Center | 妇儿中心 | | 0.38 | 1.93 | Tianhe |
| APM06 | Huangpu Dadao | 黄埔大道 | OSI: 13 (Huacheng Square North) 1315 | 0.49 | 2.42 | Tianhe |
| APM07 | Tianhenan | 天河南 | OSI: (Tiyu Xilu 1 114 3 311) | 0.51 | 2.93 | Tianhe |
| APM08 | Tianhe Sports Center South | 体育中心南 | | 0.32 | 3.25 | Tianhe |
| APM09 | Linhexi | 林和西 | 3 317 | 0.65 | 3.90 | Tianhe |

== Operating hours ==
The system was designed to provide service from 6:00 to 24:00 every day, and may run extra hours on special occasions, such as weekends, holidays or when major events are being held. But due to the low demand, trains operated from 8:00 to 20:00 when the line first opened. The service hours have since been gradually extended and from 4 October 2014 trains have been operating between 7:00 and 23:30.

== Rolling stock ==
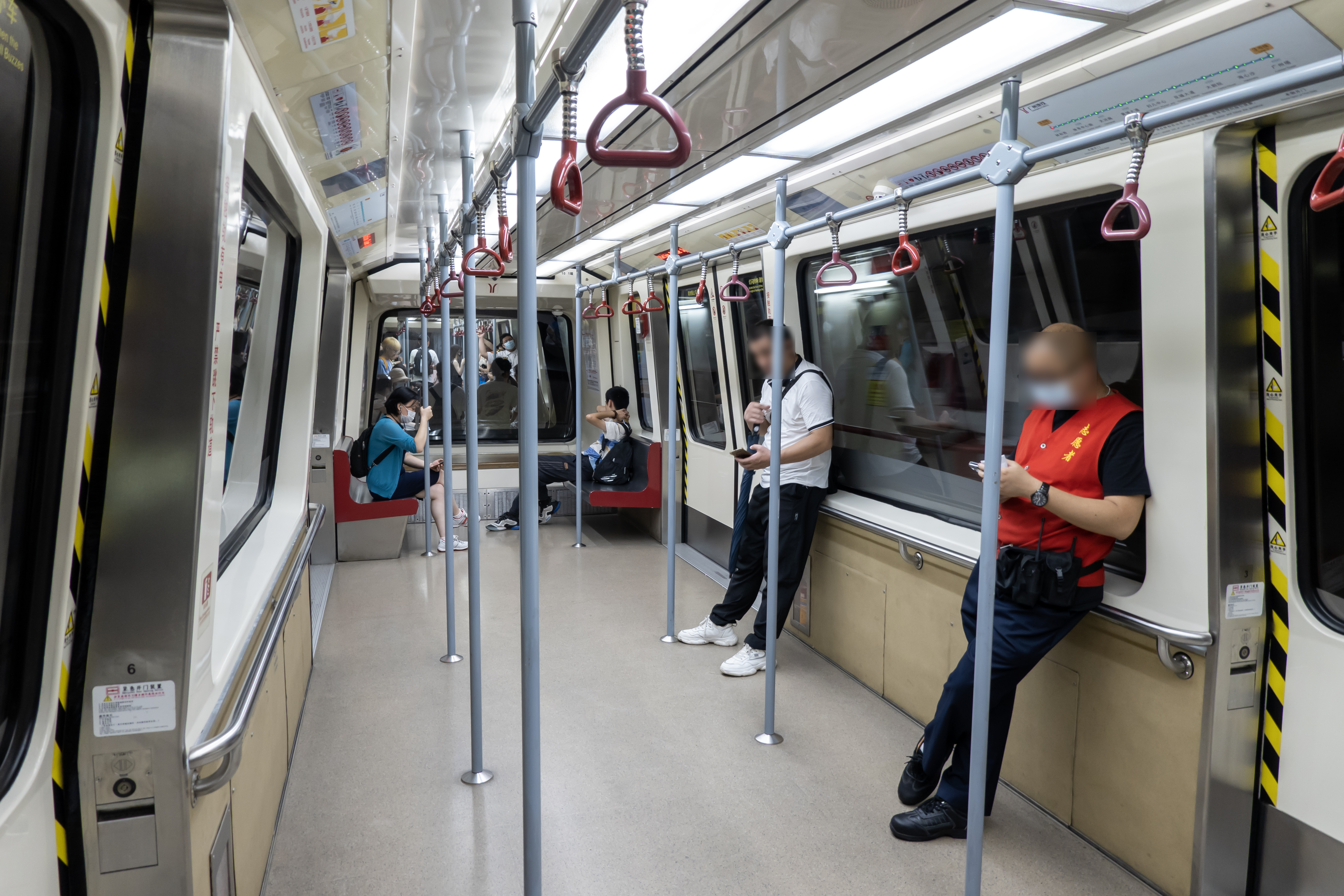
A Guangzhou APM line train interior

The APM uses 14 Bombardier Transportation's APM 100 cars built in Pittsburgh, Pennsylvania, United States of America. The Guangzhou APM Line train Bombardier Innovia APM 100 vehicles exterior and interior design looks are similar to the Singapore Bukit Panjang LRT Bombardier Innovia APM 100 C801A vehicles. Circular LED headlights and taillights create a more streamlined look.
