= Canton Tower station =

Guangzhou Metro interchange station

Coordinates: 23.10600°N 113.32361°E

Canton Tower 广州塔
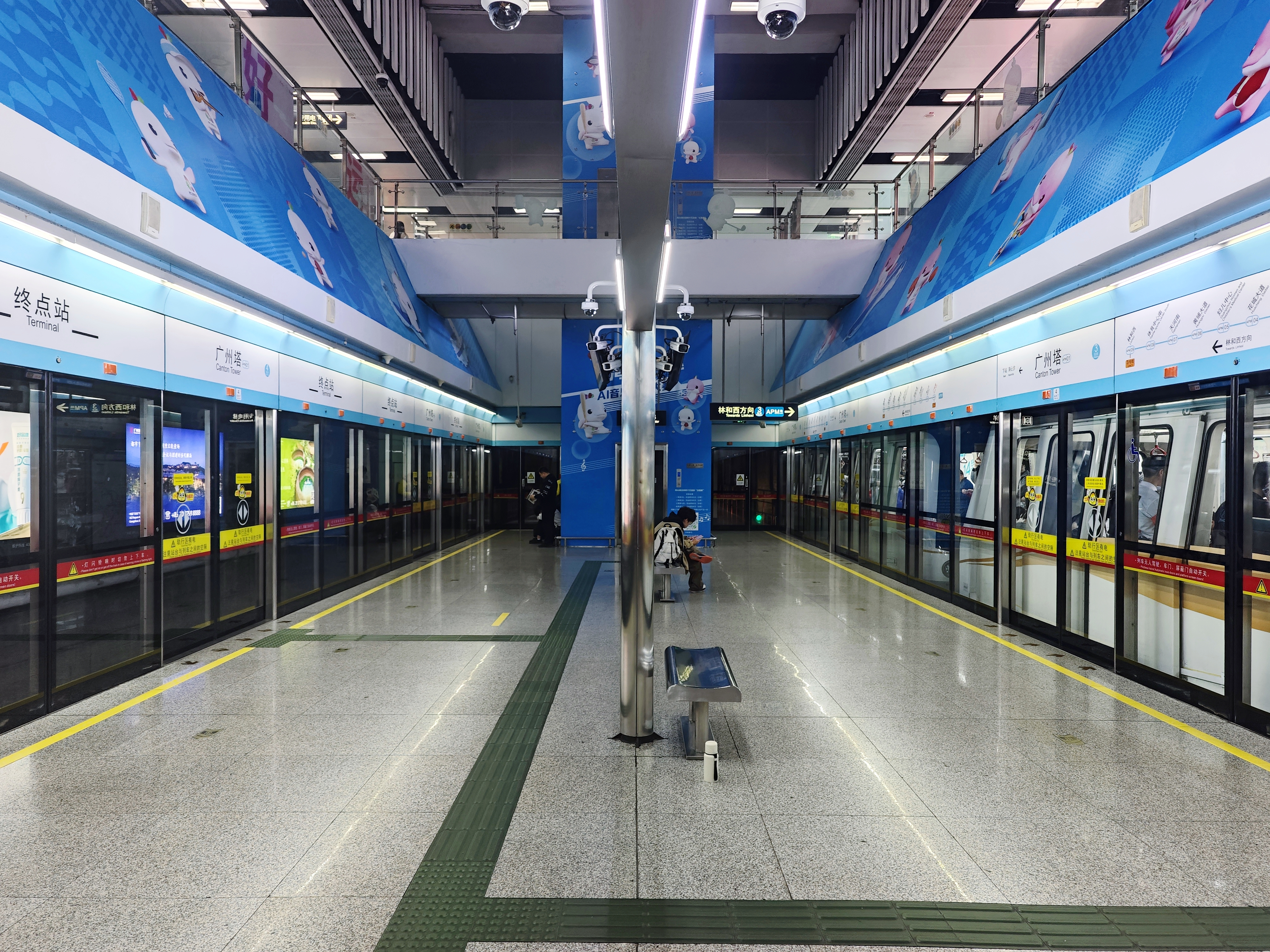
- APM line platform (15th National Games style)

Chinese name
- Simplified Chinese: 广州塔站
- Traditional Chinese: 廣州塔站
Transcriptions
Standard Mandarin
- Hanyu Pinyin: Guǎngzhōu Tǎ Zhàn
Yue: Cantonese
- Yale Romanization: Gwóngjāu Taap Jaahm
- Jyutping: Gwong^{2}zau^{1} Taap^{3} Zaam^{6}

General information
- Location: Haizhu District, Guangzhou, Guangdong; China
- Operated by: Guangzhou Metro Co. Ltd.
- Lines: Line 3; APM line
- Platforms: 4 (2 island platforms)
- Tracks: 4

Construction
- Structure type: Underground
- Accessible: Yes

Other information
- Station code: 309 APM01

History
- Opened: 26 December 2005; 20 years ago (Line 3); 28 November 2010; 15 years ago (APM)

Services
Preceding station	Guangzhou Metro	Following station
Kecun towards Haibang	Line 3	Zhujiang New Town towards Airport North (Terminal 2) or Tianhe Coach Terminal
Terminus	APM line	Haixinsha towards Linhexi
Location

Canton Tower station (simplified Chinese: 广州塔站; traditional Chinese: 廣州塔站; Cantonese Yale: Gwóngjāu Taap Jaahm) is an interchange station between Line 3 and the APM line of the Guangzhou Metro. It is also the southern terminus of the APM line. The Line 3 started operations on 28 December 2005 and the APM line station started operations on 28 November 2010. It is an underground station located to the south of Binjiang Road East in Haizhu District, on the south bank of the Pearl River.

The station was previously called Chigang Pagoda Station (赤岗塔站), named after the nearby Chigang Pagoda which, despite being a relatively lesser-known architectural heritage in Guangzhou, was the only recognisable structure in the immediate vicinity when the station was constructed. However, after the station was opened, the Canton Tower, a new TV and sightseeing tower, was built directly above it. This iconic piece of architecture quickly became the city's new landmark, and the name of the station was often confused with Chigang station (赤岗站) of line 8, so it was changed to Canton Tower Station in December 2013 when Line 6 was opened. The station's original name of Chigang Pagoda is now used for a station on Line 12. It is the first station built for sightseeing purposes in the Guangzhou Metro system. The station is connected to an underground APM system which provides quick access to the Zhujiang New Town CBD across the river.

== Nearby tram station ==
A tram station, Canton Tower Tram Station, is the western terminus of the Haizhu Tram line of the Guangzhou Trams. The tram station closed for renovation on 12 November 2024 and rebuilt, and was reopened on 1 July 2025.

== Station layout ==
G	Street level	Exit
L1; Concourse	Transfer passageway	Transfer passageway between Line 3 & APM Line, Buffer area of Line 3, Shops
L1; Concourse	APM Line Lobby	Customer Service, Shops, Vending machines, ATMs
L2; Concourse & Platforms	Line 3 Lobby	Customer Service, Shops, Vending machines, ATMs
L2; Concourse & Platforms	Platform 4	APM termination platform
L2; Concourse & Platforms	Island platform, doors will open on the left
L2; Concourse & Platforms	Platform 3	APM towards Linhexi (Haixinsha)
L3; Platforms	Platform 1	3 towards Haibang (Kecun)
L3; Platforms	Island platform, doors will open on the left
L3; Platforms	Platform 2	3 towards Tianhe Coach Terminal or Airport North (Zhujiang New Town)

== Gallery ==
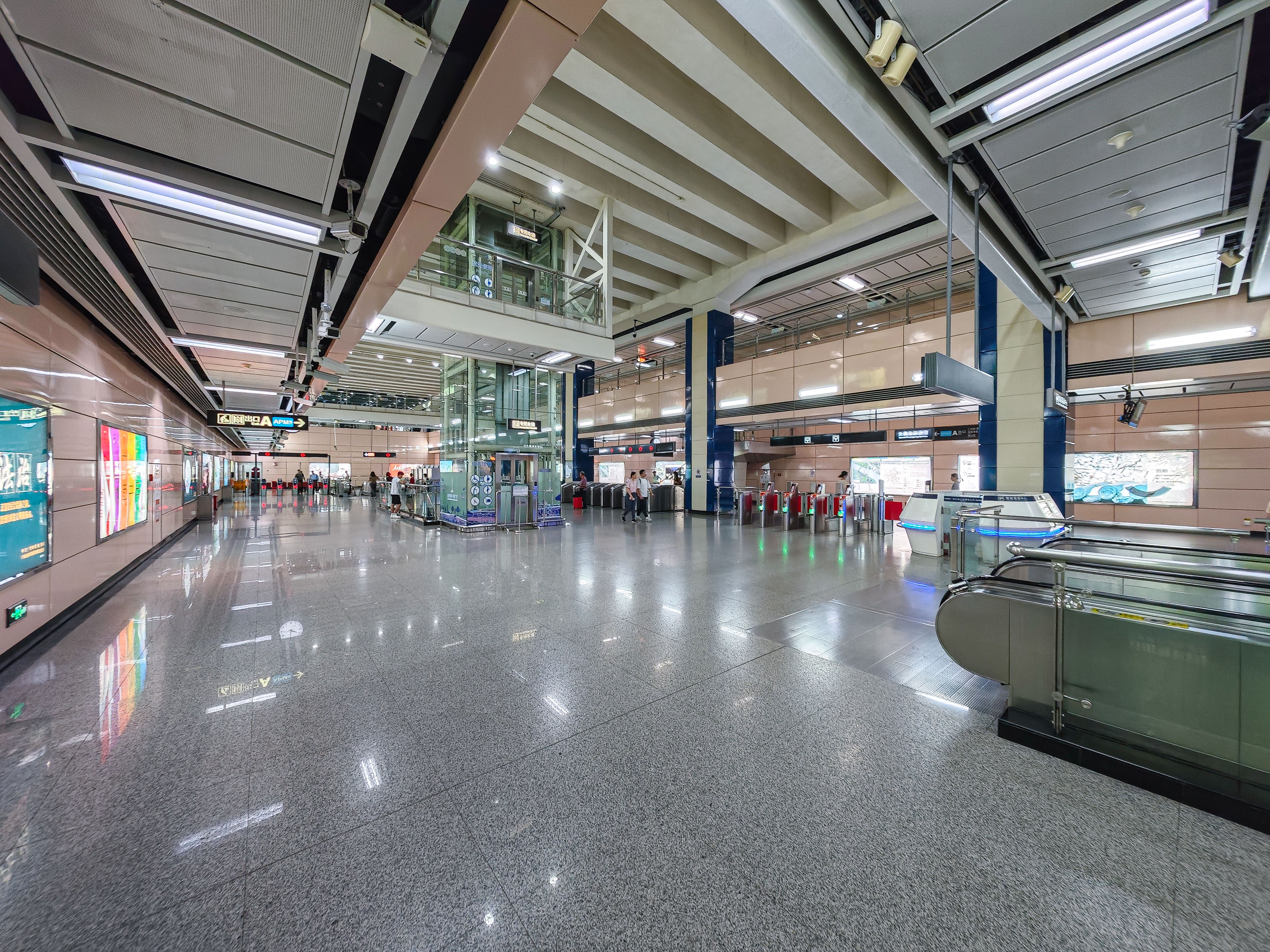
Line 3 concourse

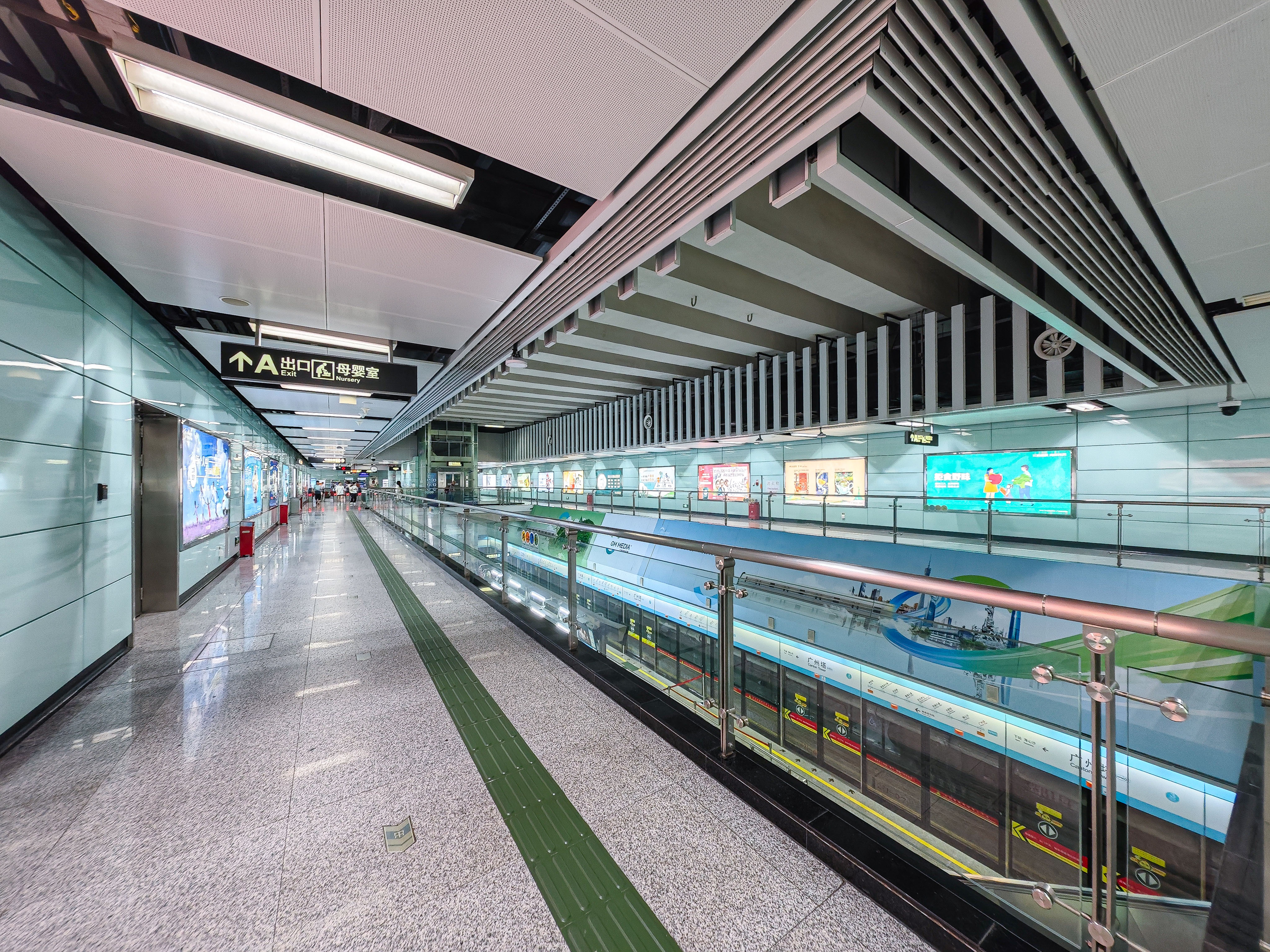
APM line concourse

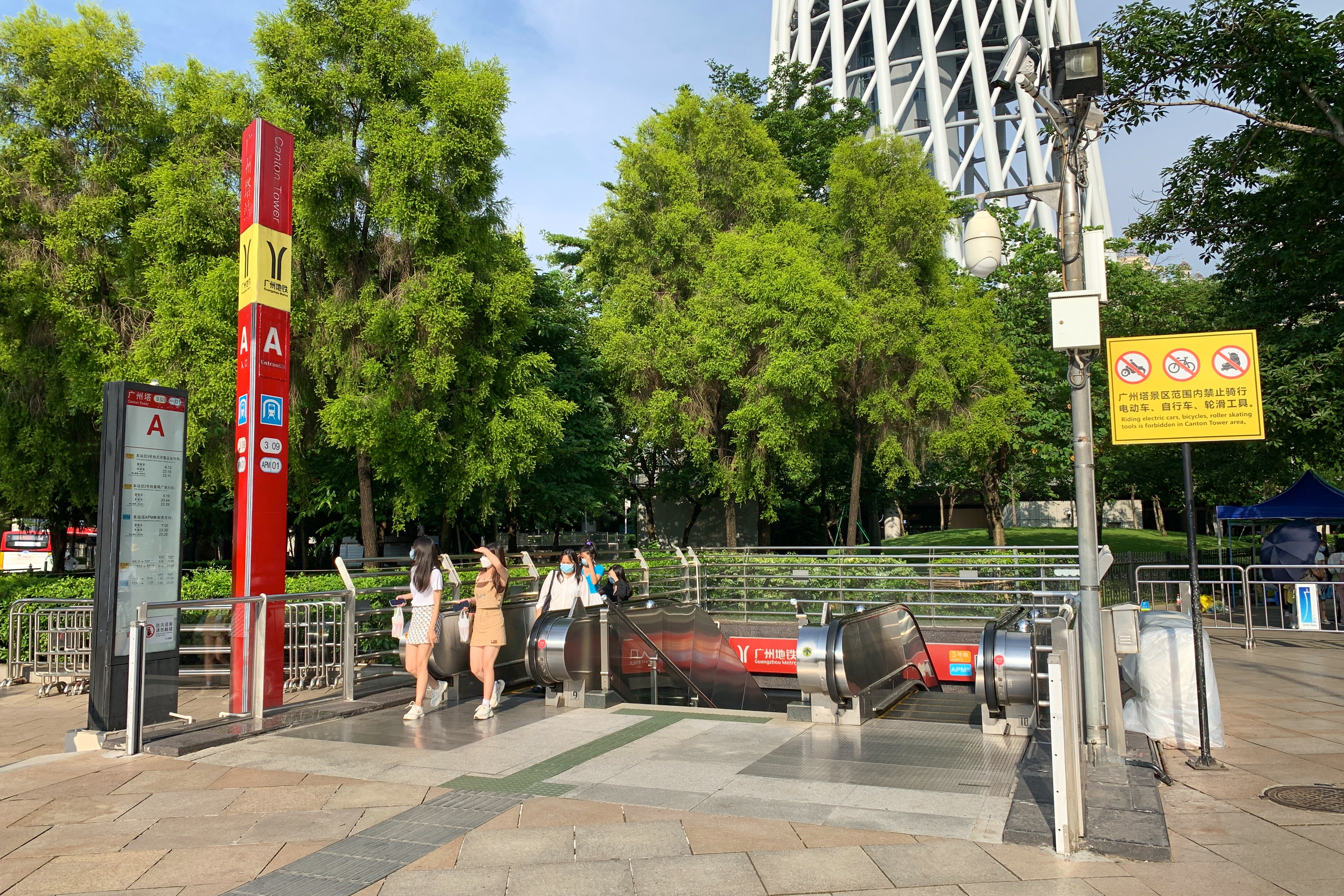
Exit A

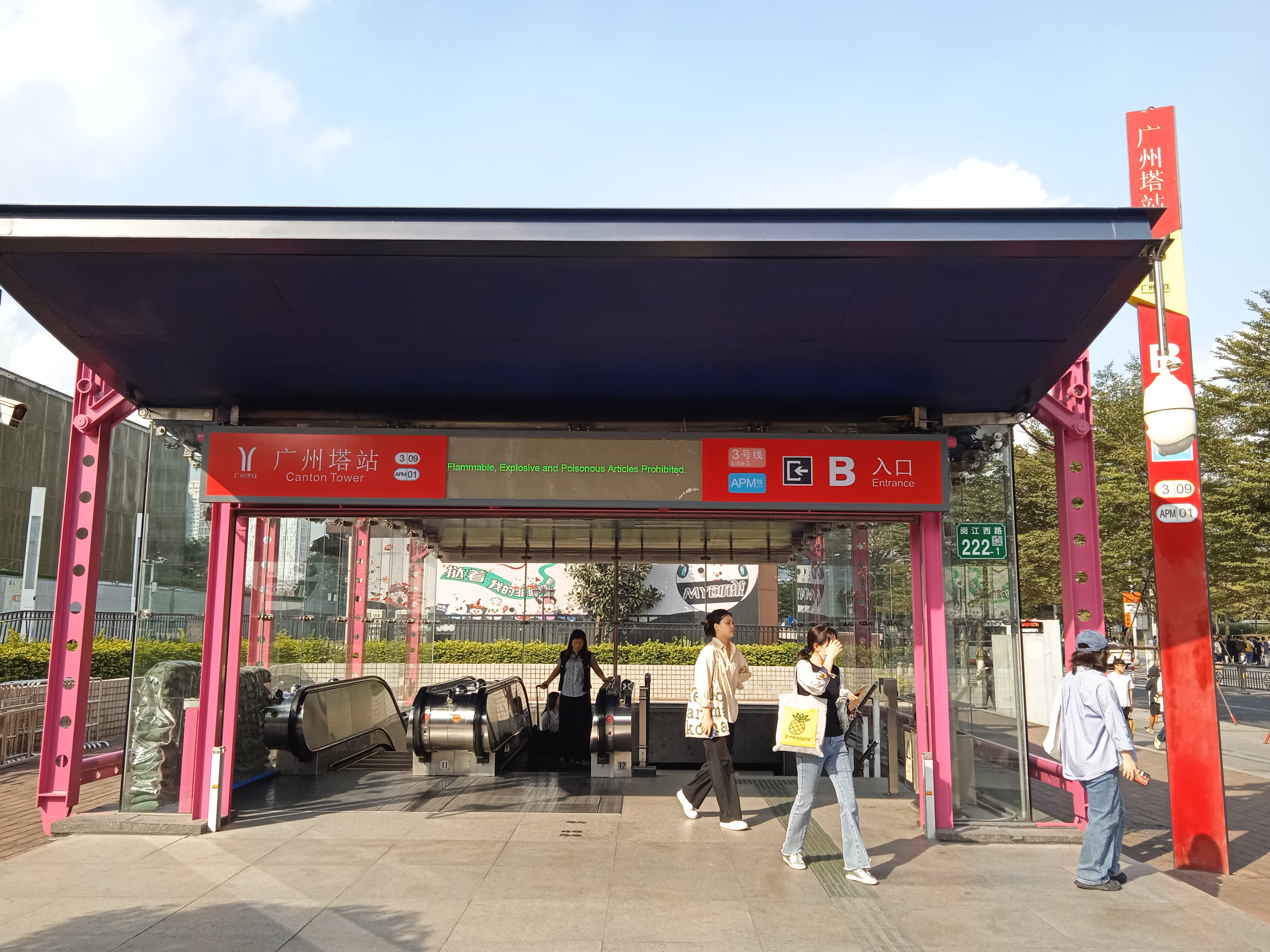
Exit B

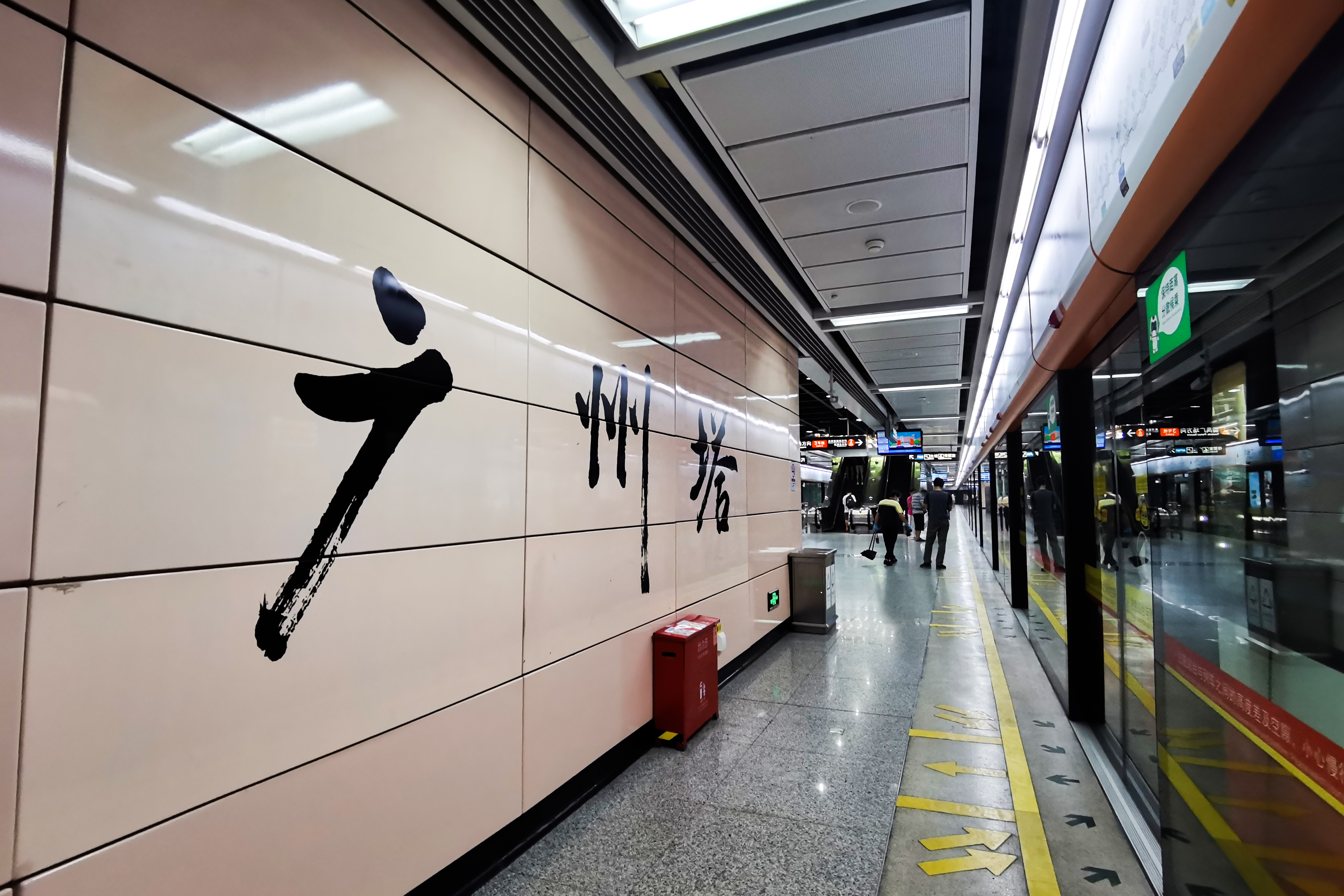
Platform 2 (Line 3)

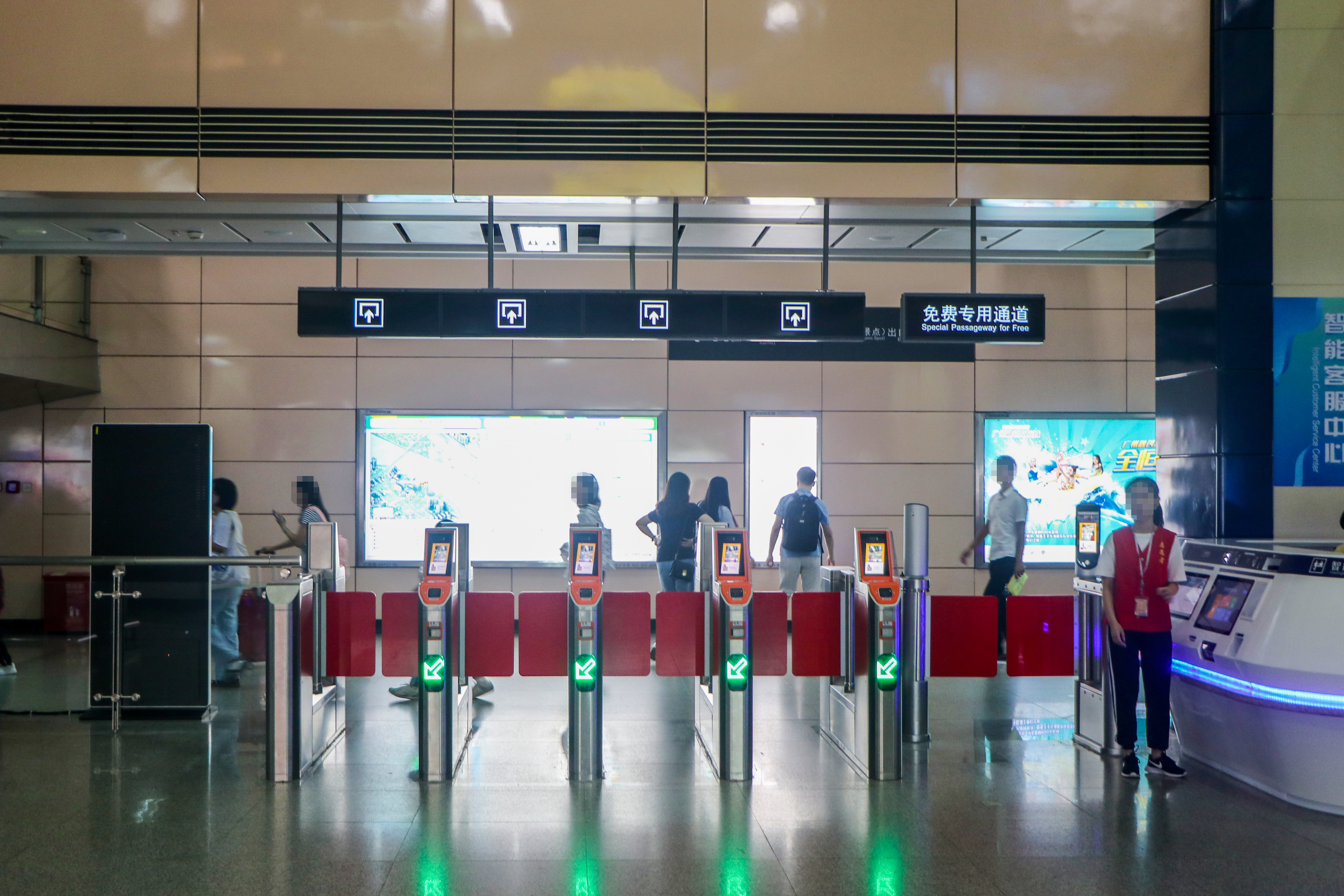
Line 3 concourse faregates

== Exits ==
Exit number	Exit location
Exit A	Yiyuan Lu, Haizhu Tram
Exit B	Yiyuan Lu
Exit	Canton Tower
Exit	Canton Tower
