= Linhexi station =

Guangzhou Metro interchange station

Linhexi 林和西
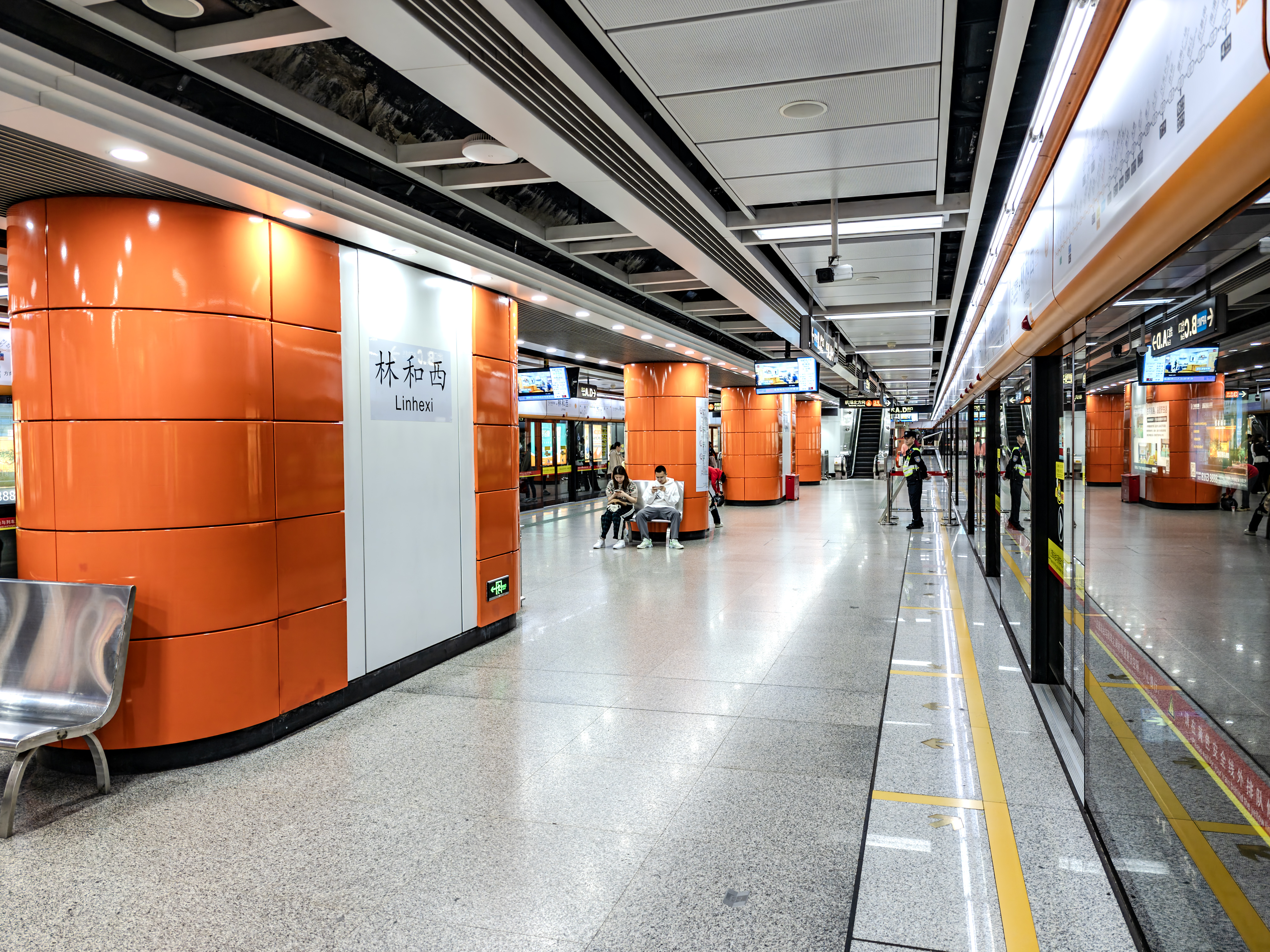
- Line 3 platform

Chinese name
- Chinese: 林和西站
Transcriptions
Standard Mandarin
- Hanyu Pinyin: Línhé Xī Zhàn
Yue: Cantonese
- Yale Romanization: Làhmwòh Sāi Jaahm
- Jyutping: Lam^{4}wo^{4} Sai^{1} Zaam^{6}
- Hong Kong Romanization: Lam Wo West station

General information
- Location: Tianhe North Road (天河北路) × Linhe West Road (林和西路); Tianhe District, Guangzhou, Guangdong; China
- Coordinates: 23°08′38″N 113°19′06″E
- Operated by: Guangzhou Metro Co. Ltd.
- Lines: Line 3; APM line
- Platforms: 4 (2 island platforms)
- Tracks: 4

Construction
- Structure type: Underground
- Accessible: Yes

Other information
- Station code: 317 APM09

History
- Opened: 26 December 2005; 20 years ago (Line 3); 8 November 2010; 15 years ago (APM line)

Services
Preceding station	Guangzhou Metro	Following station
Tiyu Xilu towards Haibang	Line 3	Guangzhou East Railway Station towards Airport North (Terminal 2)
Tianhe Sports Center South towards Canton Tower	APM line	Terminus
Location

Linhexi Station (Chinese: 林和西站; Cantonese Yale: Làhmwòh Sāi Jaahm; lit. 'Linhe West Station') is an interchange station between Line 3 and the APM line of the Guangzhou Metro. It is also the northern terminus of the APM line. The Line 3 station started operation on 26 December 2005. The APM line station started operation on 8 November 2010. It is located underground the junction of Tianhe Road North (天河北路) and Linhe West Road (林和西路) in the Tianhe District.

== Station layout ==
G	Street level		Exits A-D
M	-		Customer Service of APM Line
L1; Concourse & Platforms	Line 3 North Lobby		Customer Service of Line 3, Ticket Machines, Safety Facilities
L1; Concourse & Platforms	Passageway		Passageway between North & South Lobbies
L1; Concourse & Platforms	Line 3 South Lobby		Customer Service of Line 3, Shops, Ticket Machines, Safety Facilities, Flight information
L1; Concourse & Platforms	Transfer Passageway		Transfer passageway between Line 3 & APM Line
L1; Concourse & Platforms		Platform 3	APM towards Canton Tower Station (Tianhe Sports Center South)
L1; Concourse & Platforms	APM Line Lobby	Island platform, doors will open on the left or right
L1; Concourse & Platforms		Platform 4	APM towards Canton Tower Station (Tianhe Sports Center South)
L2; Platforms		Platform 2	3 towards Airport North (Guangzhou East Railway Station)
L2; Platforms	Island platform, doors will open on the left
L2; Platforms		Platform 1	3 towards Haibang (Tiyu Xilu)

== Gallery ==
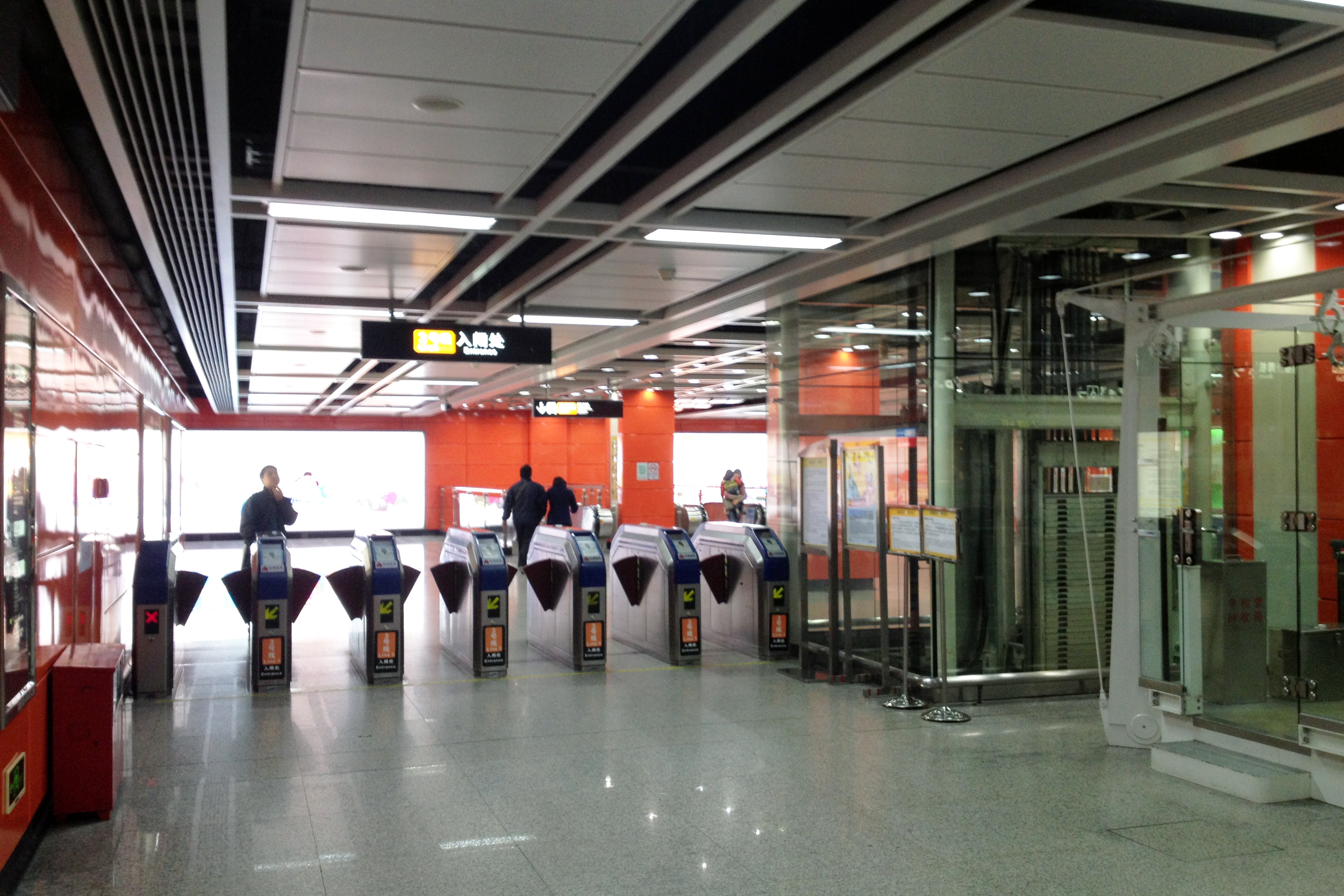
Line 3 north concourse

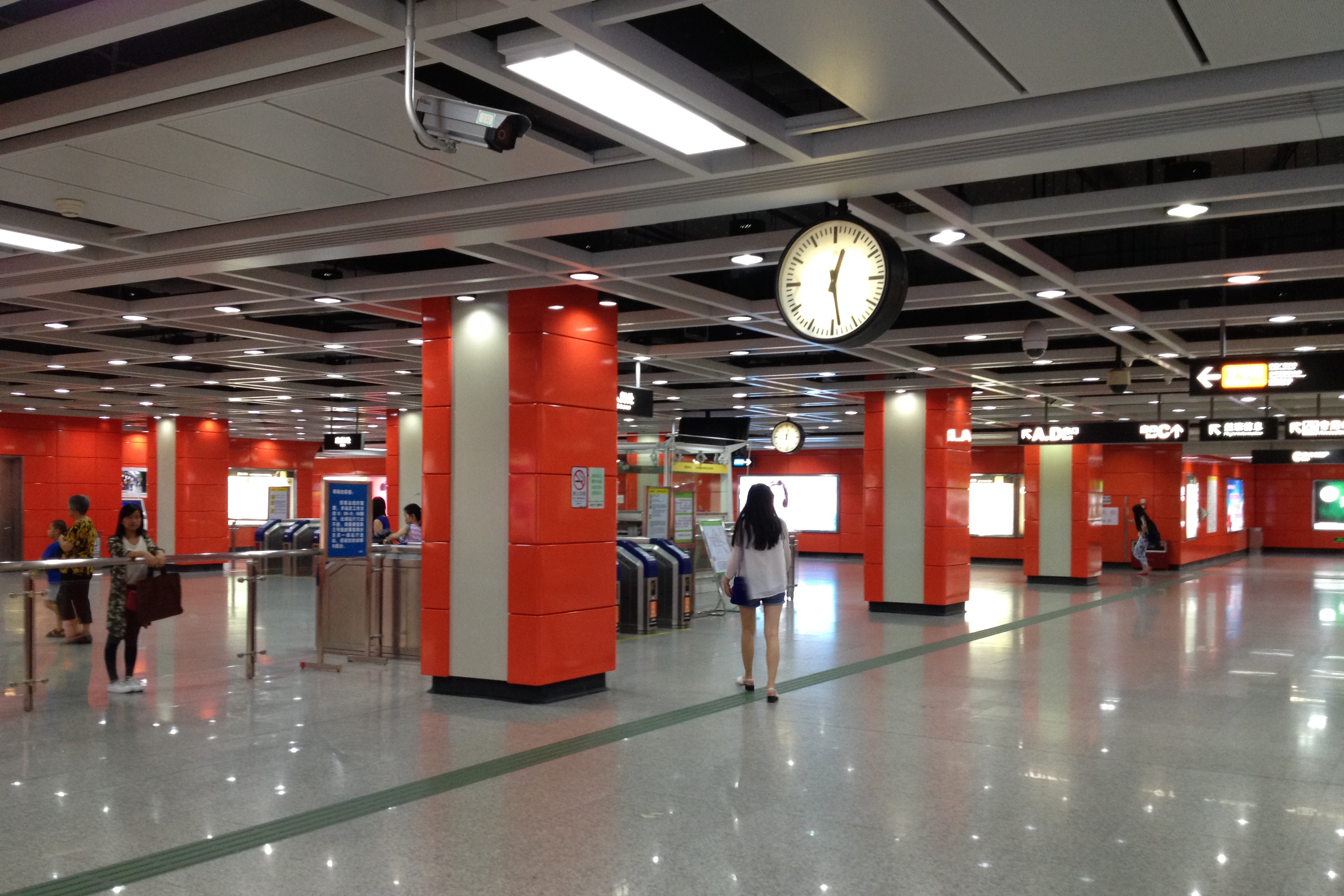
Line 3 south concourse

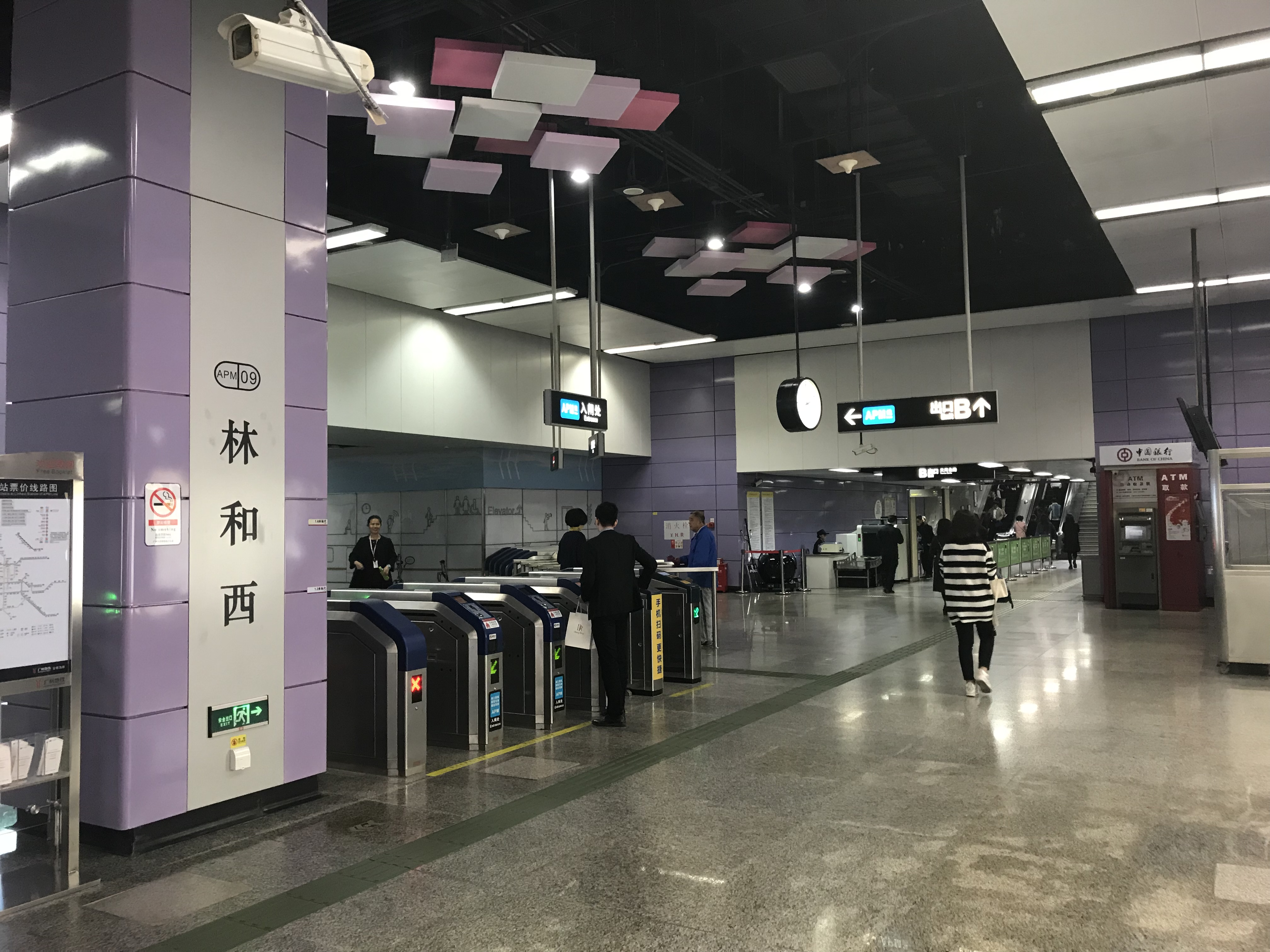
APM line concourse

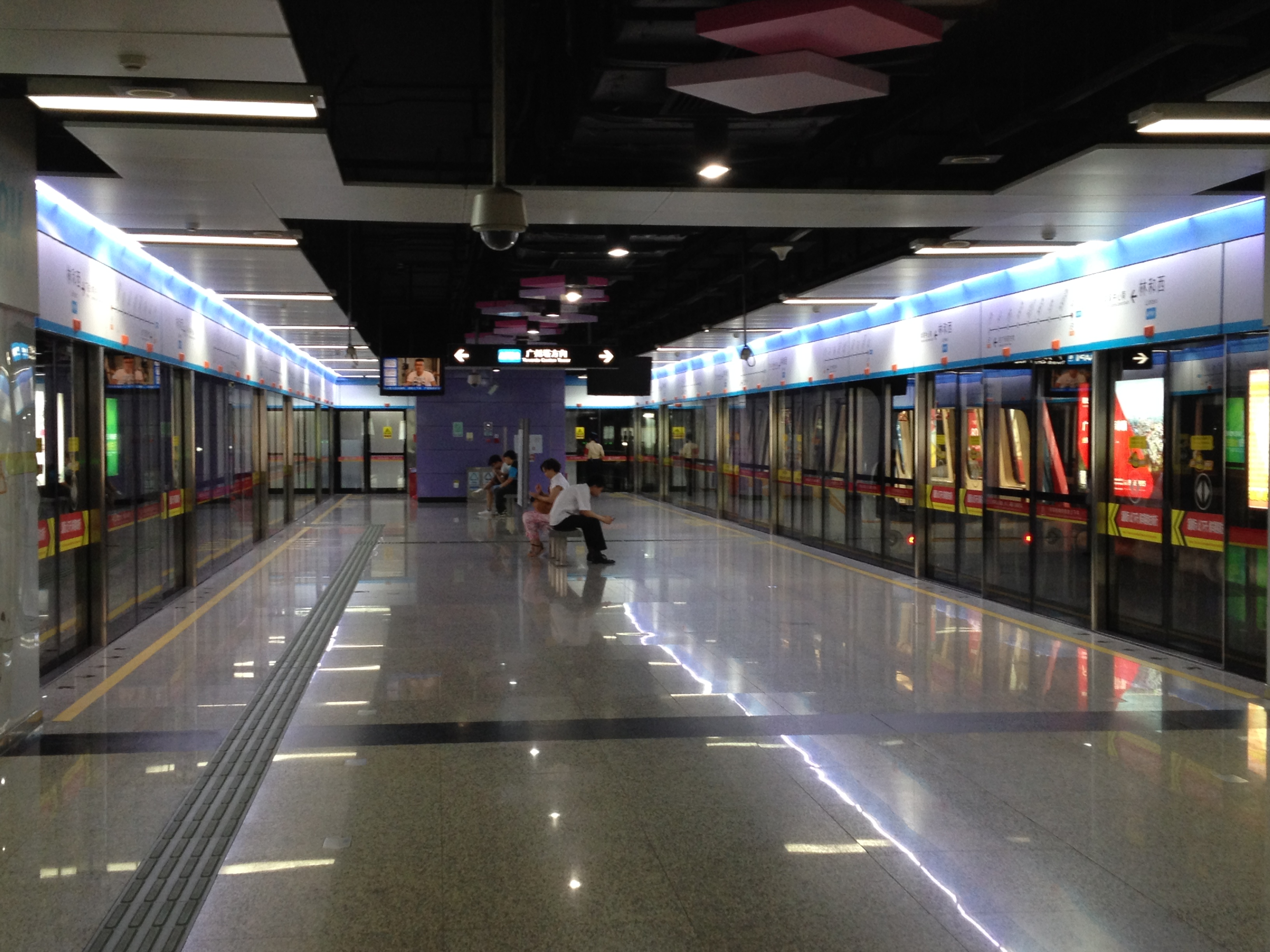
APM line platform

== Around the station ==
- CITIC Plaza
