= Guangdong Museum =

Museum in Guangzhou, Guangdong, China

- 广东省博物馆
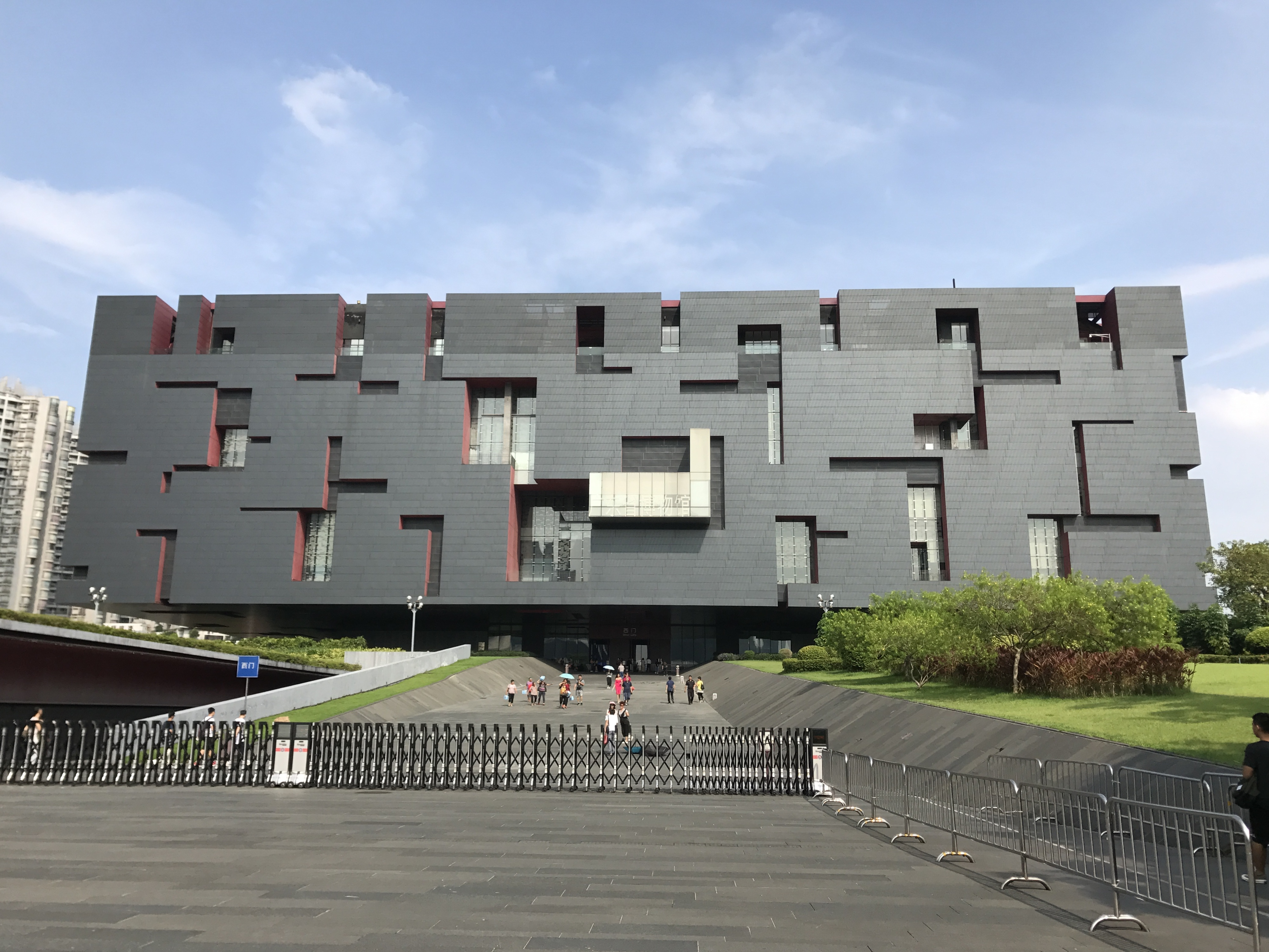
- Guangdong Museum main building
- Established: 1959
- Location: Zhujiang New Town, Tianhe District, Guangzhou, Guangdong, China
- Coordinates: 23°06′53″N 113°19′35″E
- Visitors: 1,557,000 (2016)
- Public transit access: Zhujiang New Town Station 3; Liede Station 5
- Website: www.gdmuseum.com (in Chinese)

Guangdong Museum
- Simplified Chinese: 广东省博物馆
- Traditional Chinese: 廣東省博物館
Transcriptions
Standard Mandarin
- Hanyu Pinyin: Guǎngdōng Shěng Bówùguǎn
Yue: Cantonese
- Jyutping: gwong^{2}dung^{1} saang^{2} bok^{3}mat^{6}gun^{2}

The Guangdong Museum (Chinese: 广东省博物馆) is a general museum of art, nature, culture and history in Guangzhou, China. It covers both local art and artifacts from Guangdong Province, as well as general Chinese art.

== History ==
=== Old building ===
The Guangdong Provincial Museum was located on 215 Wenming Road. (23°07′26″N 113°16′37″E), in Yuexiu District, Guangzhou, on which was the original site of Sun Yat-sen University. It was a provincial general museum, founded in 1959 and with a land area of 43,000 square meters. It comprised three major parts: the museum, the relic of the First National Congress of the Kuomintang and Lu Xun Memorial House. Other affiliated buildings include the Red Tower (红楼) and the observatory of Sun Yat-sen University.

There are two separate buildings. The building that housed the original National Sun Yat-sen University became the Lu Xun Memorial Hall and contains an exhibition of objects related to Lu Xun and some other intellectuals who influenced Chinese modernization and indirectly prepared the way for the communist revolution.

The newer building to the right was initially built in 1957–1959 and greatly enlarged in 1992. It contains several distinct exhibitions and has notices in English. In the historical exhibition of "Chaozhou wood carving", on display are screens and other objects elaborately carved in wood as well as an explanation of the history and different techniques used in the art.

The next section on the ground floor was an exhibition of modern ceramic figures sculpted in the traditional Shiwan (Foshan) style. Each window was dedicated to a different artist with a brief biography and some examples of their work.

Upstairs there was a section dedicated to the history of the city of Guangzhou from prehistoric times to the modern day. Guangzhou was always a center of trade with foreign nations, and many of the objects from the semi-colonial years come from England (postcards, pictures, and other documents).

Another section housed an exhibition of old Chinese pottery and china wares, while yet another section contained posters in traditional Chinese calligraphy.

Not long after the opening of the new Guangdong Museum in May 2010, the old Guangdong Province Museum closed its doors permanently.

=== Relocation ===
In 2003, the Guangdong government made a master plan for Zhujiang New Town to make it a new center of Guangzhou. According to this plan, Zhujiang New Town Plaza would be the cultural center of the city with a series of pavilions and public facilities, such as the Guangdong Museum, Guangzhou Opera House, Guangdong Library, and an activity center for teenagers. In 2004, the old Guangdong Museum was relocated to Zhujiang New Town. The new museum occupies 41,000 square meters above ground and 15,000 square meters underground. The building holds an interior area of 66,980 square meters with viewing areas for patrons comprising 21,000 square meters, including a large open grass slope around the building for the public.

=== Architecture ===
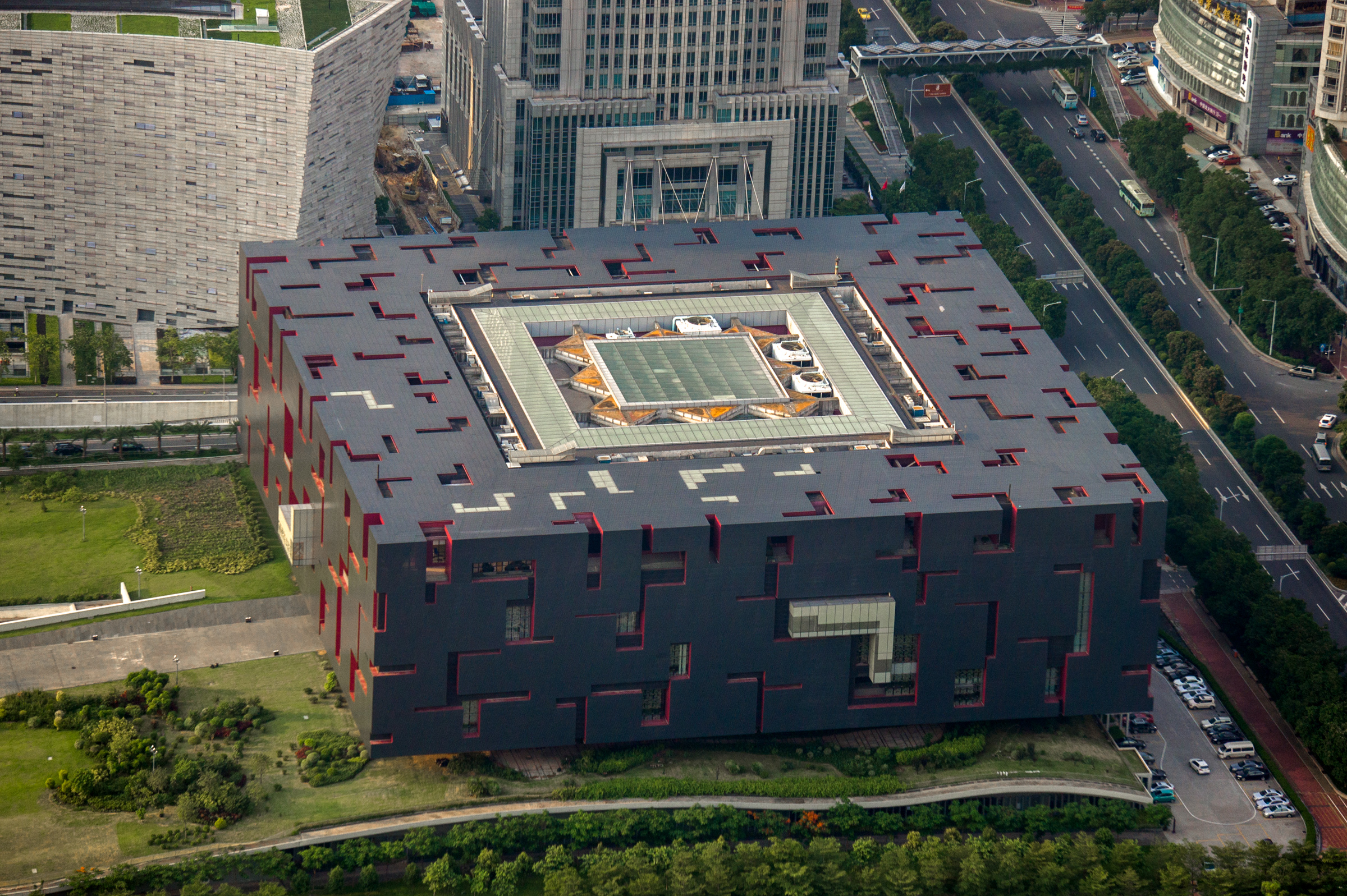
New Guangdong Museum

The design of the museum, comprising a kind of multi-layer and transparent spatial configuration, was inspired by the traditional Cantonese ivory puzzle ball, which is characterized by a stack of carved ivory, similar to an onion. Thus, the spatial arrangement of the museum is designed to follow the ivory-layered composition of traditional Cantonese crafted artwork with multiple transparent concentric layers expanding from the atrium towards the peripheral spaces. The main circulation space is a spiral staircase that goes from the first floor to the top floor, leading to different exhibition areas on each floor. Separated by transparent glass and an iron curtain, the corridors on each floor lead visitors from outside into the four-story atrium to gain an overall view of the interior space. The ivory puzzle ball represents the technique of Cantonese vernacular craftsmanship.

=== Exhibition spaces ===
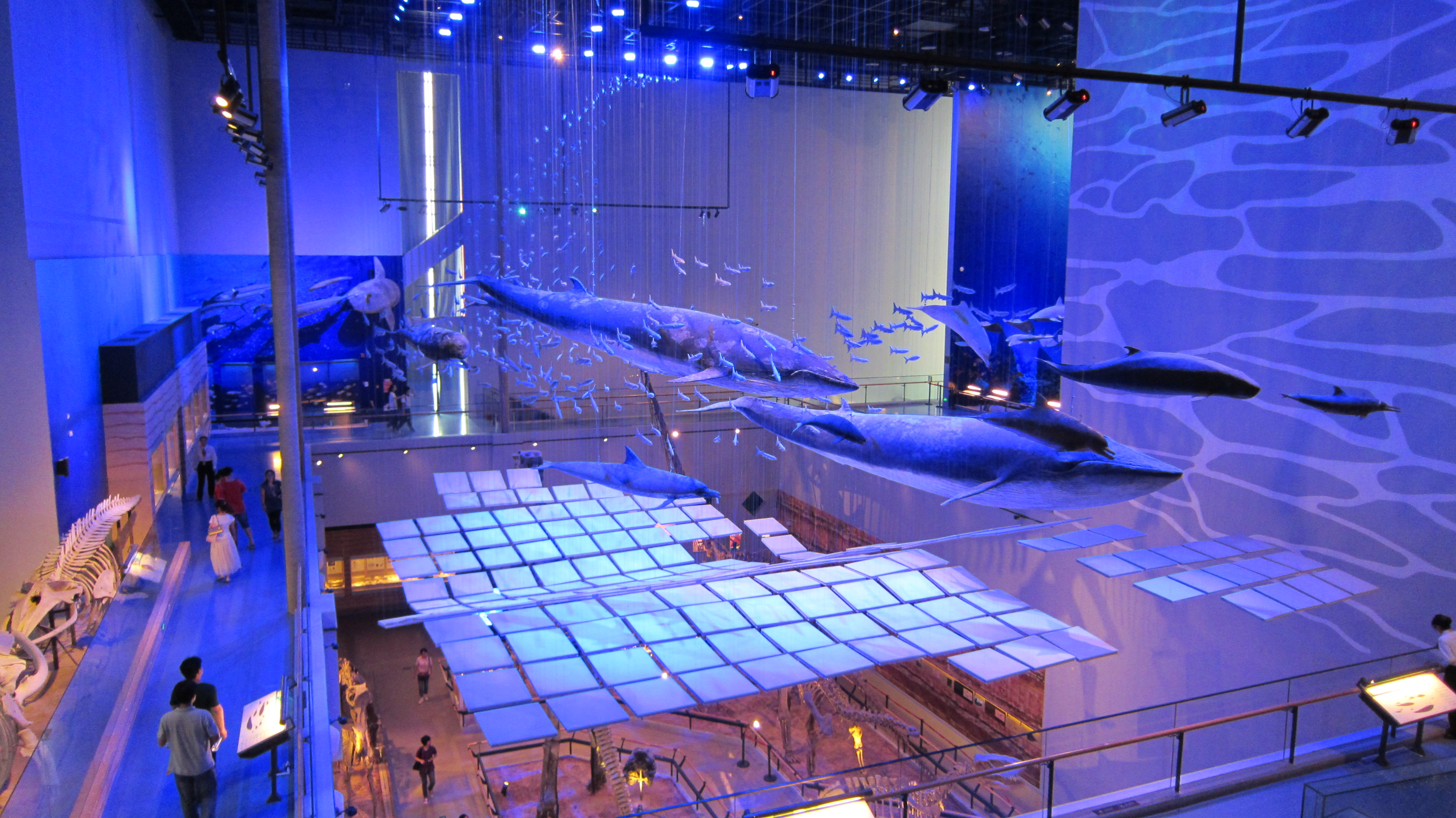
Exhibit Ocean World in the museum

The museum's main exhibition space consists of a room for historical artifacts, an exhibition space for nature, and a vernacular art exhibition area, which together house the museum's permanent collections. Temporary exhibitions are updated frequently for the public, offering the citizens a chance to view foreign artworks and exotic treasures. The atrium and corridors are places for people to take a rest, while the office and administration spaces are on the top floor of the museum.

== See also ==
- Guangdong Museum of Art
- List of museums in China
