= Liede, Guangzhou =

Subdistrict of Tianhe, Guangzhou, China

Coordinates: 23°7′2″N 113°19′45″E

Liede Subdistrict (Chinese: 猎德街道) is a subdistrict in Tianhe District, Guangzhou, China. It was established in 1999.

== History ==
The street has an old village called "Liede Village" (Chinese: 猎德村). But the reconstruction work of the village started in 2007. The village site will be replaced by new residential and commercial buildings of Zhujiang New Town. The village is an "experimental pioneer" in redevelopment, with particular attention being paid to villagers' wishes.

Besides, there is a sewage treatment plant in the area, which is the second largest in Guangzhou.

There is a Guangzhou Metro station in the area, called "Liede Station".

== See also ==
- Liede Station
