= AISG =

AISG may refer to:

- Adequate and independent state ground
- Antenna Interface Standards Group
- American International School of Guangzhou
