= HBIC =

HBIC may refer to:

- Huamei-Bond International College, now Guangzhou Huamei International School, in China
- "Head Bitch in Charge", a nickname for American reality TV personality Tiffany Pollard (born 1982)
