= Link Central City =

Shopping mall in Shenzhen, China

Link Central City (formerly known as New Yijing Commercial Center, Yijing Central City, Central City Plaza) is a large shopping mall in Futian District, Shenzhen, located next to Shenzhen Convention and Exhibition Center Station. Link Central City was completed in 2007, with 5 floors and a retail area of approximately 83,900 square meters.

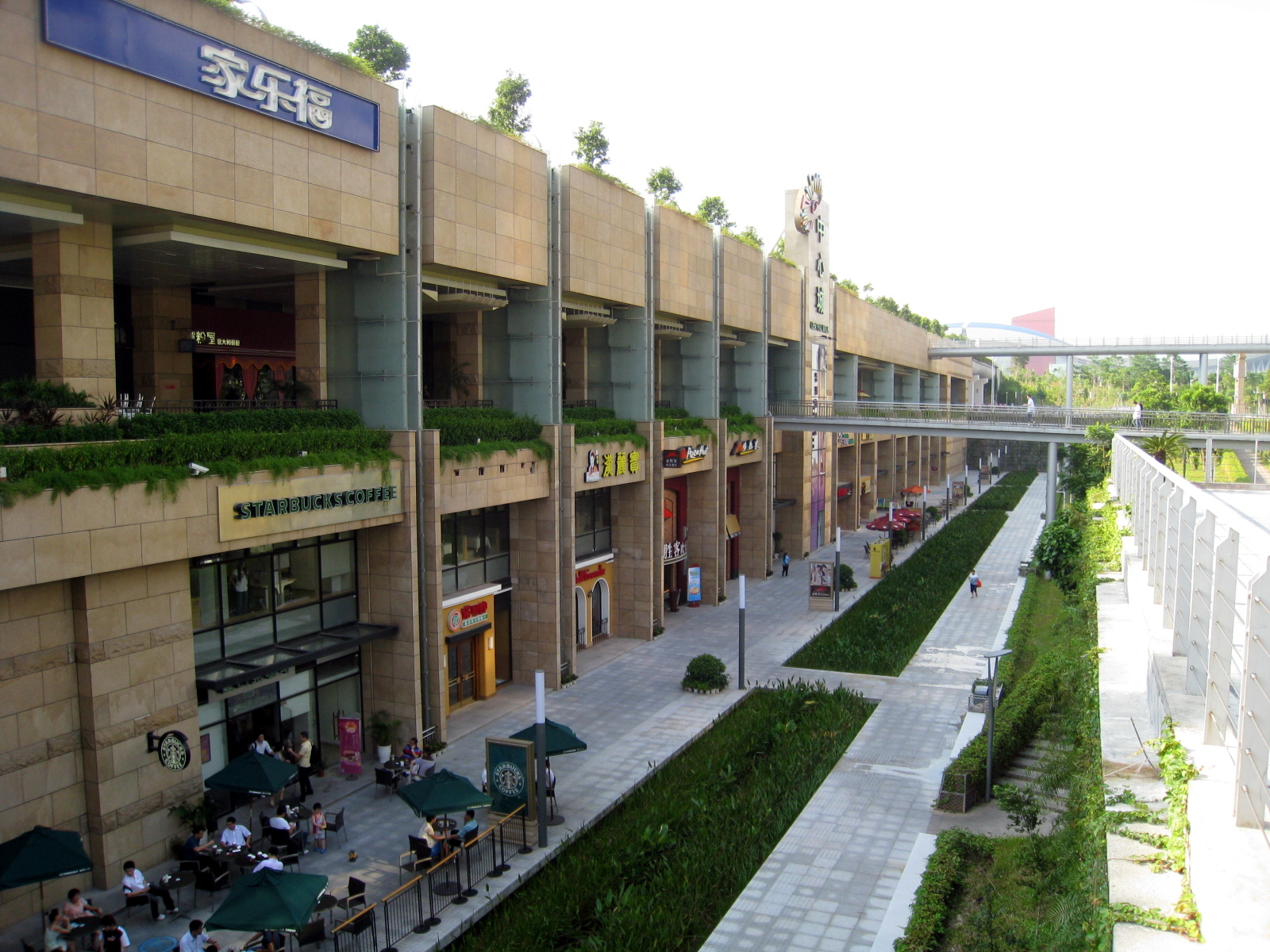

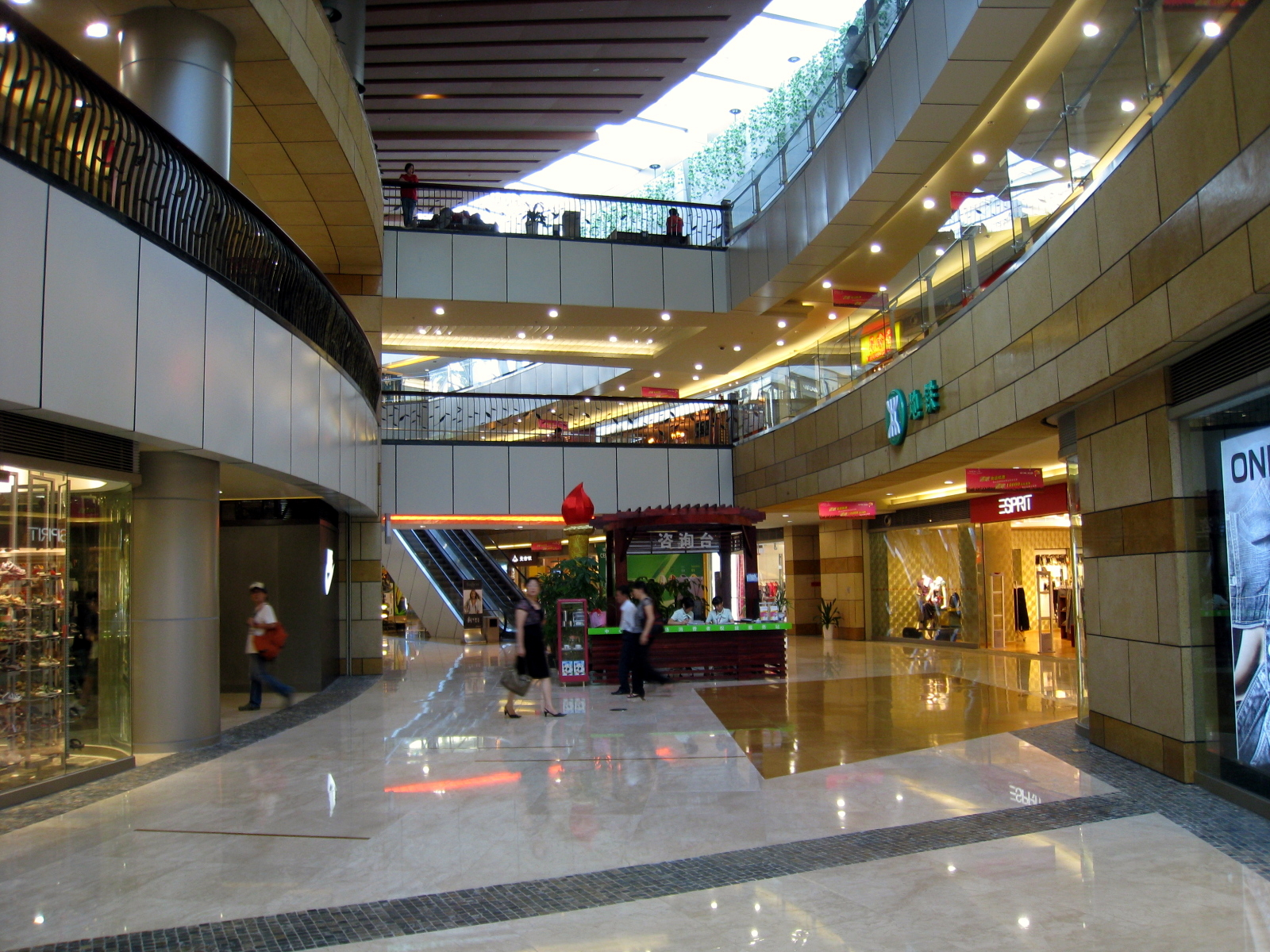

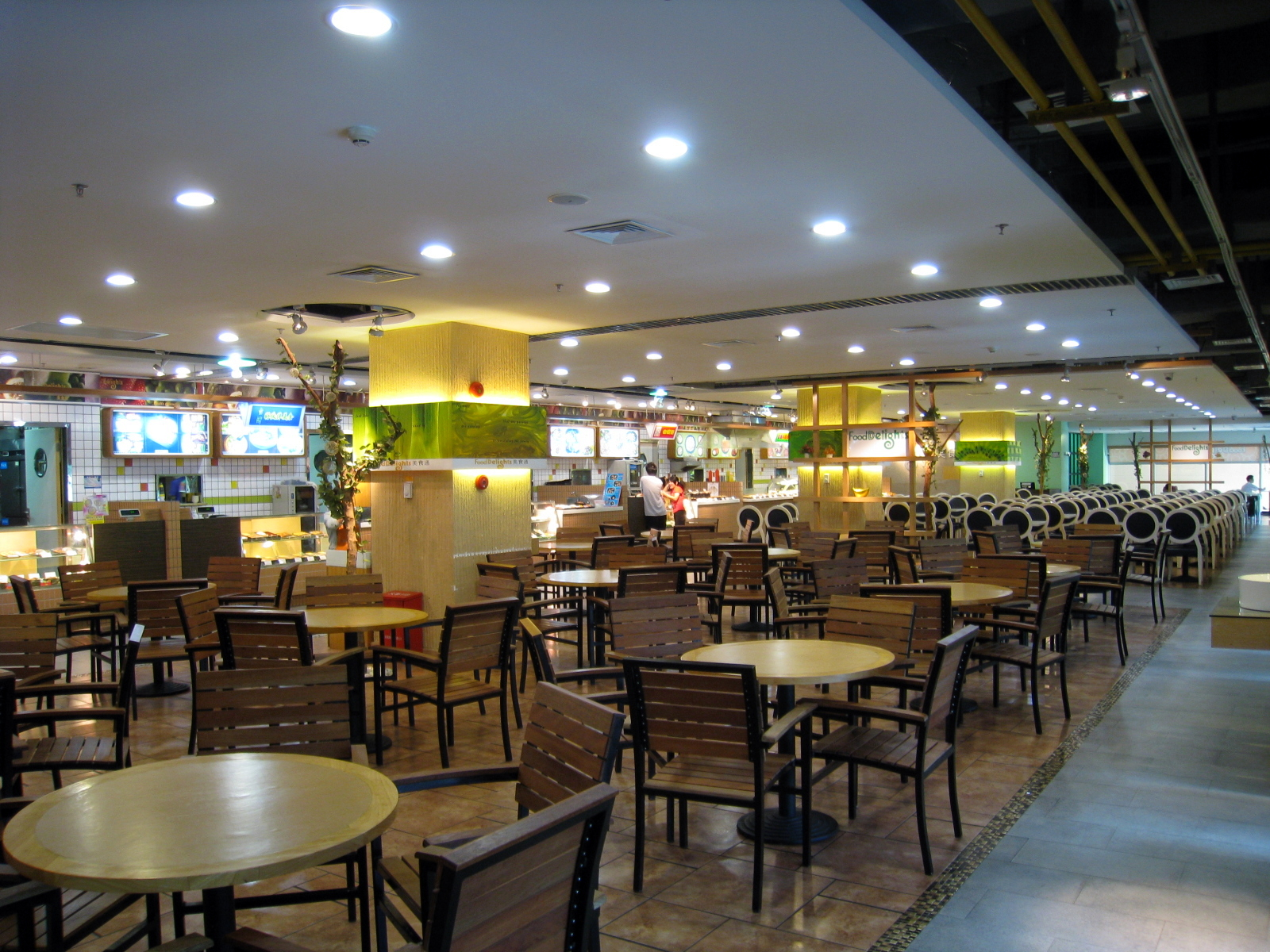

== History ==
In 2002, Shenzhen Xiangjiang Times Square Industrial Co., Ltd. acquired the right to use the land of Xin Yijing Commercial Center. 70% of the shares of Xiangjiang Times Square Company are held by Shenzhen Nanfang Xiangjiang Industrial Co., Ltd., while the remaining shares are held by Shenzhen Yijing Investment Development Co., Ltd. Subsequently, the shares held by Nanfang Xiangjiang Industrial have changed hands many times. Shenzhen Sanjiu Automobile Development Co., Ltd., Excellence Real Estate and Prudential Financial Group of the United States successively took over the relevant shares. In 2013, Yijing Investment bought back the 50% stake held by Prudential Financial Group and wholly owned Xin Yijing Commercial Center.

In February 2019, Link Real Estate Investment Trust announced the acquisition of Xin Yijing Commercial Center for RMB 6.6 billion.

In March 2019, the mall was renamed Central City Plaza.

In 2020, the mall underwent an asset enhancement project, which will be completed in 2022, including the reduction of some Carrefour space.

In 2023, Carrefour will close, and Link REIT will re-divide the original site, which will be completed in 2024, and introduce shops such as the Russian Goods Market, and create a food and beverage area.

Starting from 2023, in response to the consumption boom of Hong Kong people going north, in addition to introducing many shops that Hong Kong people like, it also cooperates with many institutions and merchants to provide Hong Kong people with consumption discounts.

== Major tenants ==
StarCraft and MeLand

Jinyi Cinema

Suning

Huawei

Uniqlo

McDonald's

Starbucks

Li Ning

Sanfu

Russian National Pavilion Russian Goods Market

Yuxin Bookstore

== Neighboring buildings ==
Royal Plaza

Liancheng New World

Ping An Financial Center

Futian Shangri-La Hotel

Shenzhen Convention and Exhibition Center

== Dispute ==
In 2012, Shenzhen Yijing Central City Commercial Development Co., Ltd. was suspected of illegally selling shops in the New Yijing Commercial Center and was required to pay compensation of RMB 1.5874 million.
