= Guangzhou High School =

Public secondary school in Guangzhou, China

Coordinates: 23.150324°N 113.356794°E

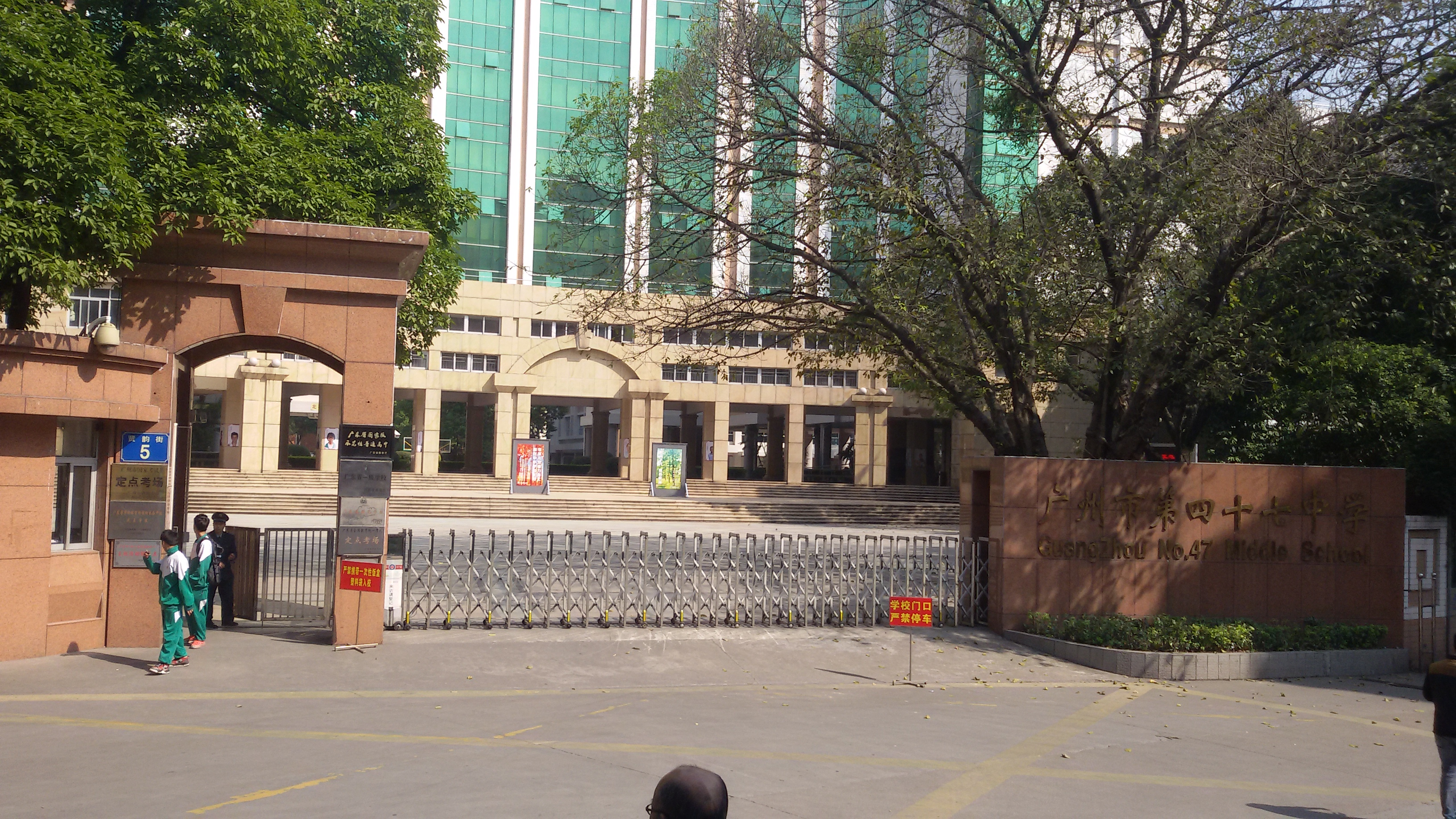
- Front gate of Wushan Campus

Location
- 5 XianYun Street, WuShan Area, Tianhe District(Junior); 63 HuaMei Street, Fenghuang Area, Tianhe District(Senior); Guangzhou, Guangdong; China

Information
- Type: public secondary school
- Motto: Truth-seeking, innovative, compatible, and vigorous
- Established: 1963
- School district: Guangzhou, Guangdong, People's Republic of China
- Principal: Xie, XiangHong
- Headmaster: Wu, Yingmin
- Faculty: 239
- Grades: 3 years junior high 3 years senior high
- Enrollment: approximately 3,220
- Campus: Urban, 12972 m^{2}
- Colors: White & Green
- Mascot: None
- Website: www.4728.cn

Guangzhou High School
- Simplified Chinese: 广州中学
- Traditional Chinese: 廣州中學
Transcriptions
Standard Mandarin
- Hanyu Pinyin: Guǎngzhōu Zhōngxué
Yue: Cantonese
- Jyutping: gwong2 zau1 zung1 hok6

Guangzhou No.47 High School
- Simplified Chinese: 广州市第四十七中学
- Traditional Chinese: 廣州市第四十七中學
Transcriptions
Standard Mandarin
- Hanyu Pinyin: Guǎngzhōu Shì Dì Sìshíqī Zhōngxué
Yue: Cantonese
- Jyutping: gwong2 zau1 si5 dai6 sei3 sap6 cat1 zung1 hok6

Guangzhou High School (Chinese: 广州中学), is a public secondary school in the southern Chinese city of Guangzhou (Canton). Founded in 1963, it was approved as a national demonstration senior high school in 2008. It used to be Guangzhou No. 47 High School until it was renamed in 2018.

== History ==
Guangzhou High School, originally Guangzhou No.47 High School, was established as a junior high school in July 1963 by Guangzhou Municipal Bureau of Education in the eastern suburban area of Liede. In July 1964, it was renamed as Guangzhou No. 51 High School and moved to a new campus in the Shahe subdistrict. In 1965, the name was restored to Guangzhou No. 47 High School. In 1968, the school began taking senior high school pupils.

In September 1985, the school was transferred to the Tianhe District Bureau of Education. In March 1986, it was approved as the key secondary school of Guangzhou Tianhe District. In April 1995, it was approved as a "provincial first-class secondary school" by Guangdong Provincial Bureau of Education.

In 2001, the provincial government, on behalf of Guangzhou city, applied for the school to become a "national demonstration senior high school". This status was finally granted in 2008, making it one of only 16 such schools at that time.

In 2002, the school received a further award as a Guangzhou "Green Environment" campus.

In 2018, the school was renamed to "Guangzhou High School".
