= Guangzhou Trout Opera Company =

Trout Opera Company (广州鳟鱼歌剧艺术团) is the first professional opera company established in South China. Based in Guangzhou, it is also the first Chinese western opera company that is not affiliated with any governmental institutions. Renowned mezzo-soprano Yun Deng, the first Chinese opera singer contracted by the New York Metropolitan Opera, acts as the company's artistic director. At the helm of the company is baritone Zheming Wu, who, like Yun Deng, also hails from Guangdong. Yulong Song, a veteran stage designer who previously worked with the Metropolitan Opera and ABC Television in the U.S., oversees stage designing at Trout Opera. Trout Opera currently boasts over 20 professional singers and young artists, nearly one third of them have studied overseas, such as in the United States, Italy, Britain, Russia, and Ukraine. Notable Trout singers who have won national recognition include Guoling Wu (soprano), Nan Zheng (soprano), Ying Qiu (mezzo-soprano).

== History ==
Trout Opera's origin can trace back to the Guangzhou Opera Institute, an institution Deng Yun founded in 2003 for the purpose of promoting western opera and cultivating operatic talents in China. After seven years' hard work, following the opening of the Guangzhou Grand Theatre, originally built as Guangzhou Opera House, Deng Yun started the Guangzhou Trout Opera Company. The prelude to the founding of Trout Opera was the first performance that the Guangzhou Grand Theatre has seen – an operatic concert that was specially staged for the Grand Theatre by Guangzhou Opera Institute. The concert, preceding Turandot, the first opera performed at the Grand Theater was named "For Princess Turandot".
