= Liede station =

Guangzhou Metro station

Coordinates: 23.1184°N 113.3328°E

Liede 猎德
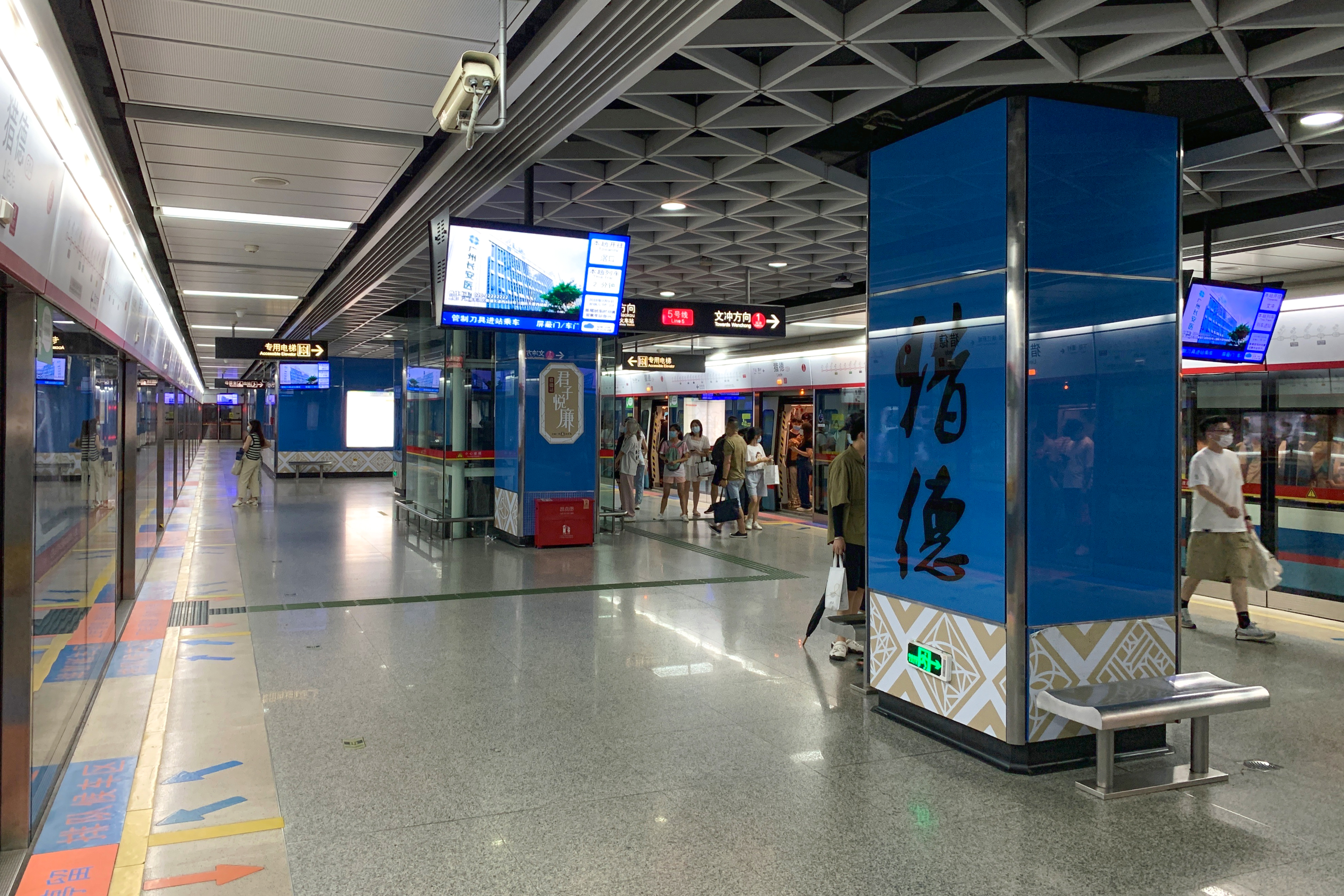

Chinese name
- Simplified Chinese: 猎德站
- Traditional Chinese: 獵德站
Transcriptions
Standard Mandarin
- Hanyu Pinyin: Lièdé Zhàn
Yue: Cantonese
- Yale Romanization: Lihpdāk Jaahm
- Jyutping: Lip^{6}dak^{1} Zaam^{6}

General information
- Location: Huacheng Avenue (花城大道) and Liede Avenue (猎德大道); Tianhe District, Guangzhou, Guangdong; China
- Operated by: Guangzhou Metro Co. Ltd.
- Line: Line 5
- Platforms: 2 (1 island platform)

Construction
- Structure type: Underground

Other information
- Station code: 514

History
- Opened: 28 December 2009; 16 years ago

Services
Preceding station	Guangzhou Metro	Following station
Zhujiang New Town towards Jiaokou	Line 5	Tancun towards Huangpu New Port
Location

Liede Station (simplified Chinese: 猎德站; traditional Chinese: 獵德站; Cantonese Yale: Lihpdāk Jaahm) is a station on Line 5 of the Guangzhou Metro. It is located under the junction of Huacheng Avenue (花城大道) and Liede Avenue (猎德大道), in Liede, Tianhe District, near the Guangzhou International Finance Center in Zhujiang New Town. The station opened on 28 December 2009.
