= Tianhe, Guangzhou =

Tianhe 天河区
- District
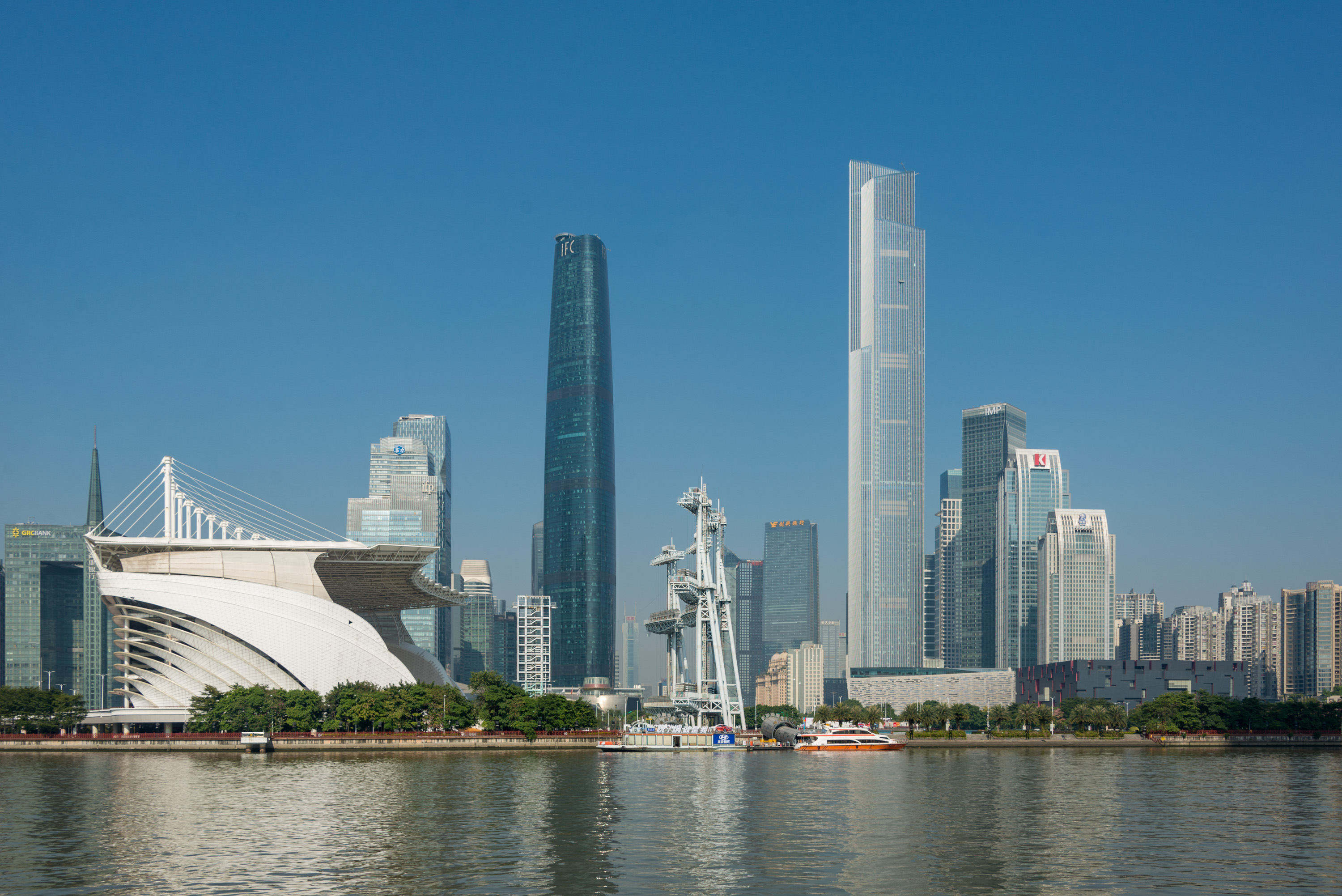
- Zhujiang New Town in Tianhe District

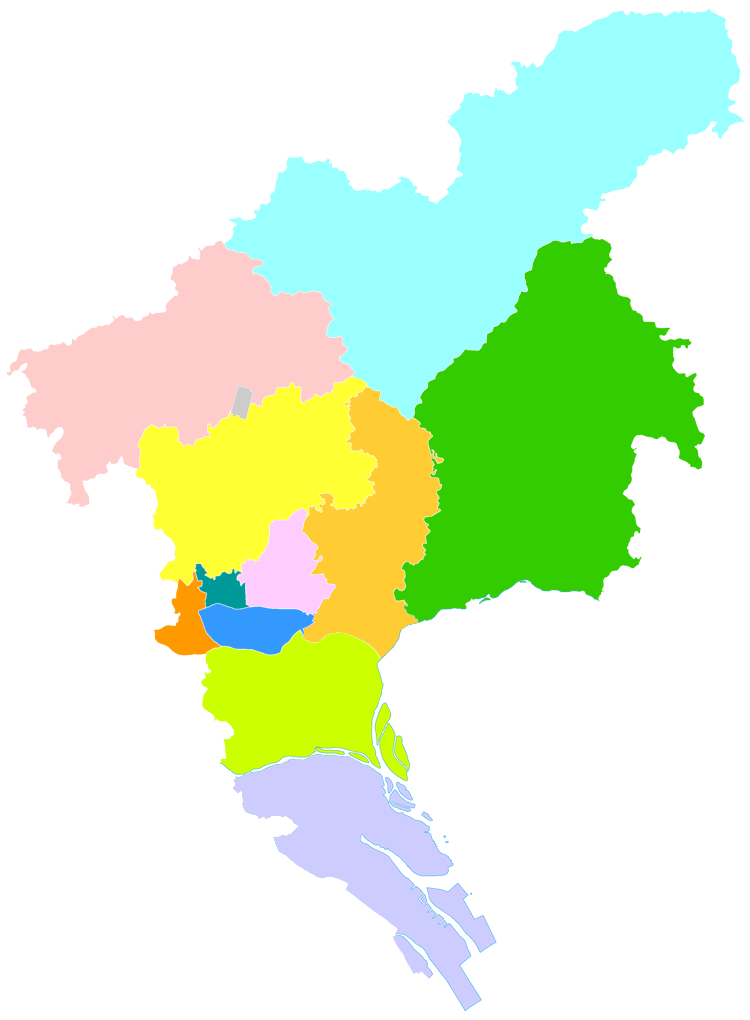
- Tianhe in Guangzhou
- Country: People's Republic of China
- Province: Guangdong
- Sub-provincial city: Guangzhou

Area
  - Total: 96.33 km^{2} (37.19 sq mi)

Population (2020 census)
  - Total: 2,241,826
  - Density: 23,270/km^{2} (60,280/sq mi)
- Time zone: UTC+8 (China Standard)
- Postal code: 510630
- Area code: 020
- Website: http://www.thnet.gov.cn/

Tianhe, Guangzhou
- Simplified Chinese: 天河区
- Traditional Chinese: 天河區
- Jyutping: Tin^{1}ho^{4} Keoi^{1}
- Hanyu Pinyin: Tīanhé Qū
Transcriptions
Standard Mandarin
- Hanyu Pinyin: Tīanhé Qū
Yue: Cantonese
- Yale Romanization: Tīnhòh Kēui
- Jyutping: Tin^{1}ho^{4} Keoi^{1}
- Canton Romanization: Tin^{1}ho^{4} Kêu^{1}
- IPA: [tʰin˥.hɔ˩]

Alternative Chinese name
- Chinese: 天河
- Jyutping: Tin^{1}ho^{4}
- Hanyu Pinyin: Tīanhé
Transcriptions
Standard Mandarin
- Hanyu Pinyin: Tīanhé
Yue: Cantonese
- Yale Romanization: Tīnhòh
- Jyutping: Tin^{1}ho^{4}
- Canton Romanization: Tin^{1}ho^{4}

Tianhe District (Chinese: 天河区) is one of the eleven districts of Guangzhou, the capital of Guangdong province. In Chinese, the name Tianhe literally means "River of Heaven", which is also a Chinese name for the Milky Way. It is bordered by Yuexiu District on the west, Baiyun District on the north and Huangpu District on the east. Haizhu District is on its south, though they are separated by the Pearl River.

Tianhe became a district in the 1980s as the city expanded its size. Back then, it was east of Dongshan District (which was merged into Yuexiu in 2005) and retained a suburban or even rural atmosphere. A majority of colleges and universities in the city were located in the district. However, Tianhe District has seen a sharp decline in arable land at an average rate of 67 hectares (170 acres) per year due to urbanization since 1991. Tianhe has since developed into one of the most desirable areas in Guangzhou.

Symbolic landmarks of Guangzhou located in Tianhe District are: Citic Plaza, Guangzhou International Finance Center, Guangzhou Opera House, and the Guangdong Museum. The 6th and 9th of The National Games of the People's Republic of China, and the 2010 Asian Games were also held in Tianhe District, Guangzhou.

== History ==
Prehistoric population settled in what is now Longdong Subdistrict (龙洞村) in the Neolithic period. Eastern Han tombs were discovered in Tianhe. During the Song dynasty, Tianhe area was called Dashuixu (大水墟; 'large river town'). The area of modern Tianhe District was part of Panyu County for more than two thousand years. The area was gradually put under Guangzhou's administration between 1937 and 1958. By the end of the Republican Period, there were two districts in Tianhe area, namely Shahe (沙河区) and Shipai (石牌区). In 1951 both districts were merged into the newly established Baiyun District, while five years later Baiyun was further merged with Huangpu and Xinjiao Districts to form suburban district (郊区). In 1960 Jiaoqu was dissolved and the area consisting of modern Tianhe became Huangpu District, however it was reestablished two years later. In 1985 part of Jiaoqu was split, and Tianhe District was established then.

In 1987 Tonghe Town (同和镇) was put into Baiyun District. In 1992 Yangji Cun was put into Dongshan District. By 1994, Kemulang (柯木塱), Yushatan (渔沙坦), and Fenghuang (凤凰) Farms along with Shadongcun (沙东村) and Erduicun were placed under Tianhe's jurisdiction. In 2000, former Xintang (新塘), Mubei (沐陂), Lingtang (凌塘), and Yushu (玉树) Farms were also placed under Tianhe and the farms gradually became subdistricts.

== Administrative divisions ==
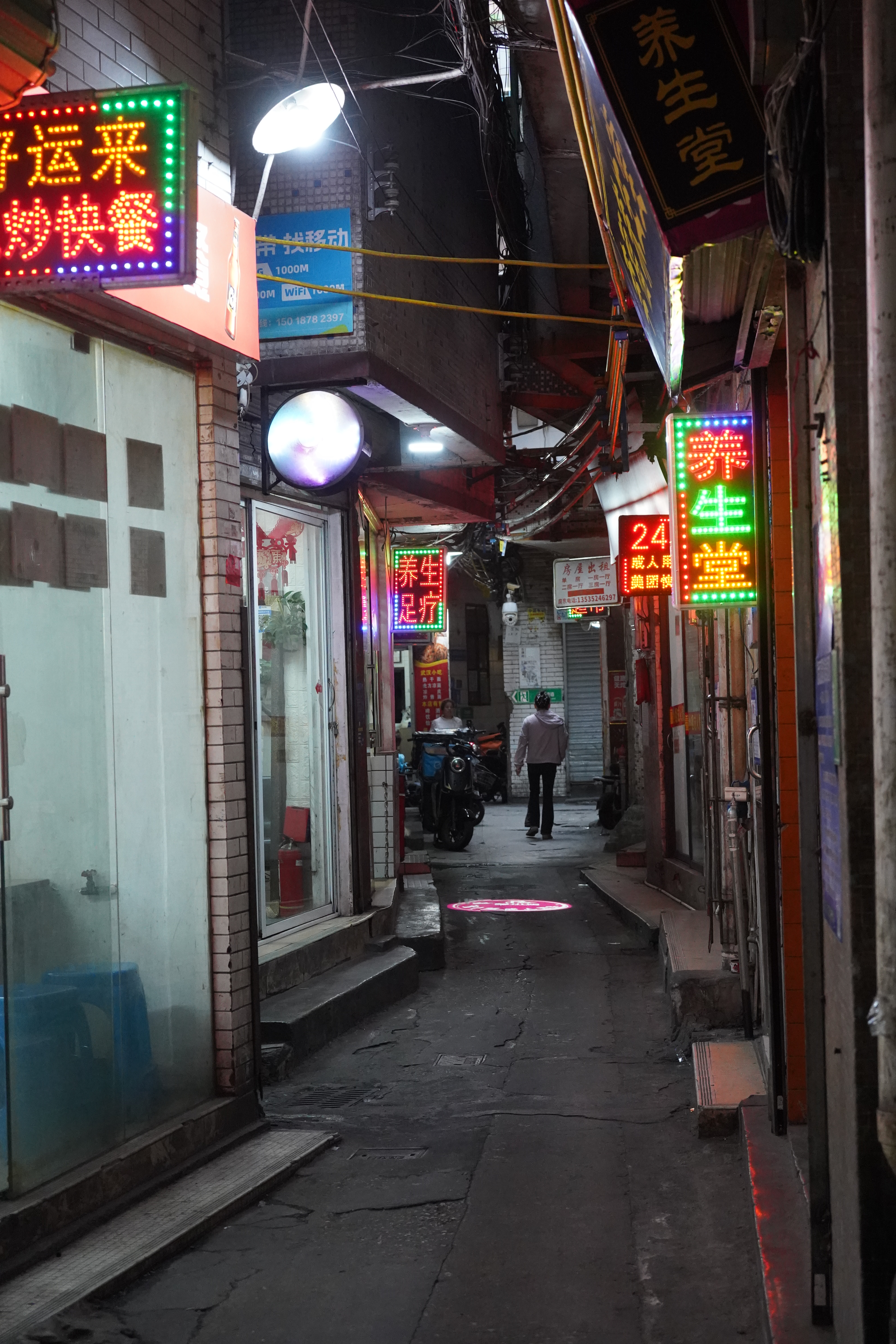
Shipai village, the most dense area in Tianhe, under daylight

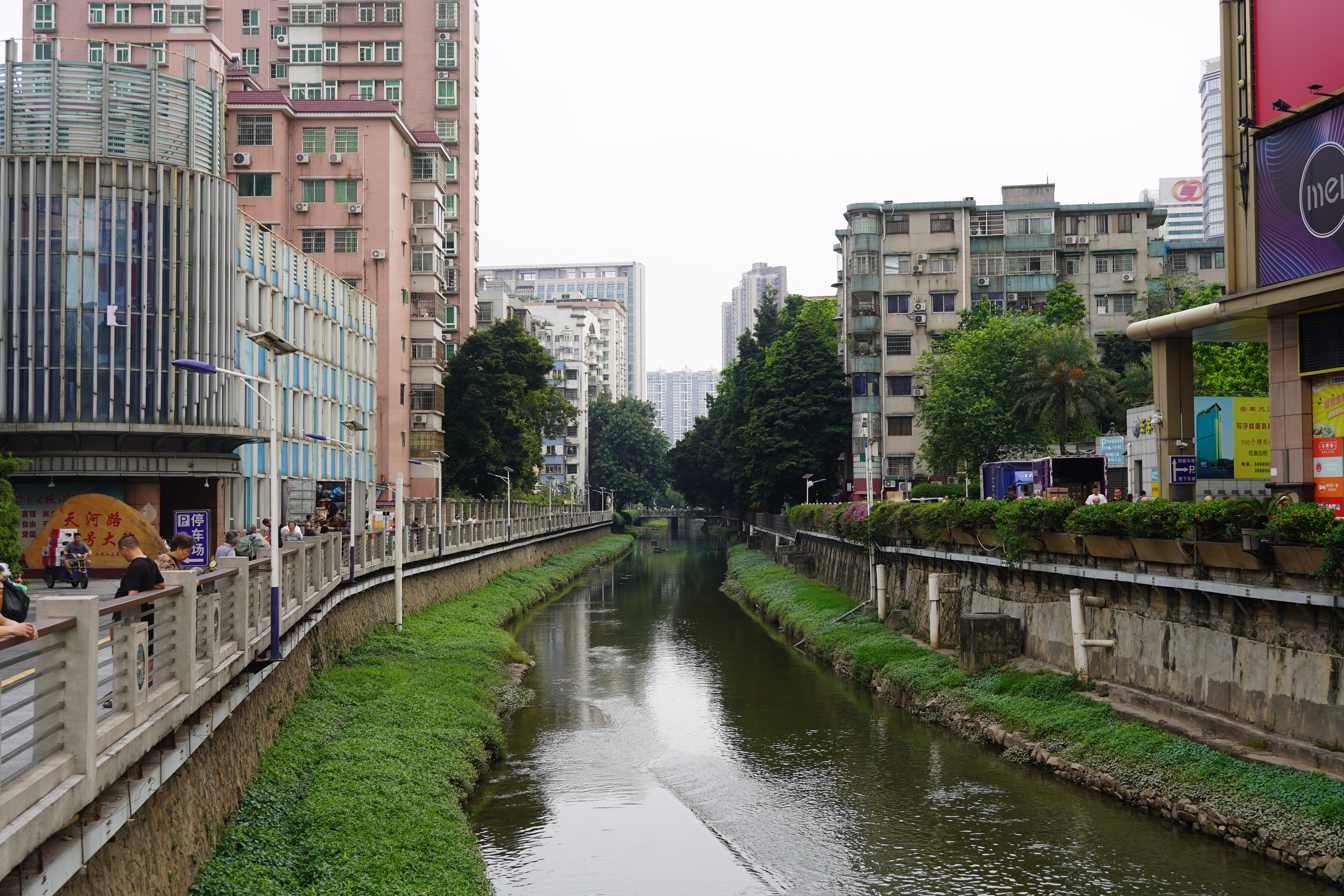
View from Shipai bridge

Name	Simplified Chinese	Pinyin	Guangdong Romanization	Population (2010)	Area (km2)
Changxing Subdistrict	长兴街道	Chángxīng Jiēdào	cêng4 hing1 gai1 dou6	66,098	13.21
Chebei Subdistrict	车陂街道	Chēbēi Jiēdào	cé1 béi1 gai1 dou6	102,787	5.60
Fenghuang Subdistrict	凤凰街道	Fènghuáng Jiēdào	fung6 wong4 gai1 dou6	19,534	22.99
Huangcun Subdistrict	黄村街道	Huángcūn Jiēdào	wong4 qun1 gai1 dou6	29,501	6.17
Liede Subdistrict	猎德街道	Lièdé Jiēdào	lib6 deg1 gai1 dou6	22,522	3.10
Linhe Subdistrict	林和街道	Línhé Jiēdào	lam4 wo4*2 gai1 dou6	59,732	3.80
Longdong Subdistrict	龙洞街道	Lóngdòng Jiēdào	lung4 dung6*2 gai1 dou6	70,055	11.70
Qianjin Subdistrict	前进街道	Qiánjìn Jiēdào	qin4 zên3 gai1 dou6	59,700	4.90
Shadong Subdistrict	沙东街道	Shādōng Jiēdào	sa1 dung1 gai1 dou6	29,522	2.16
Shahe Subdistrict	沙河街道	Shāhé Jiēdào	sa1 ho4*2 gai1 dou6	42,814	1.26
Shipai Subdistrict	石牌街道	Shípái Jiēdào	ség6 pai4 gai1 dou6	177,198	4.30
Tangxia Subdistrict	棠下街道	Tángxià Jiēdào	tong4 ha6 gai1 dou6	177,864	7.42
Tianhenan Subdistrict	天河南街道	Tiānhénán Jiēdào	tin 1ho4 nam4 gai1 dou6	62,912	2.08
Tianyuan Subdistrict	天园街道	Tiānyuán Jiēdào	tin1 yun4 gai1 dou6	54,769	4.03
Wushan Subdistrict	五山街道	Wǔshān Jiēdào	ng5 san1 gai1 dou6	131,795	10.59
Xiancun Subdistrict	冼村街道	Xiǎncūn Jiēdào	xin2 qun1 gai1 dou6	51,284	4.07
Xinghua Subdistrict	兴华街道	Xìnghuá Jiēdào	hing1 wa4 gai1 dou6	68,139	4.28
Xintang Subdistrict	新塘街道	Xīntáng Jiēdào	sen1 tong4 gai1 dou6	41,207	14.95
Yuancun Subdistrict	员村街道	Yuáncūn Jiēdào	yun4 qun1 gai1 dou6	81,831	5.37
Yuangang Subdistrict	元岗街道	Yuángǎng Jiēdào	yun4 gong1 gai1 dou6	30,610	3.23
Zhuji Subdistrict	珠吉街道	Zhūjí Jiēdào	ju1 ged1 gai1 dou6	52,552	10.01

== Developments ==
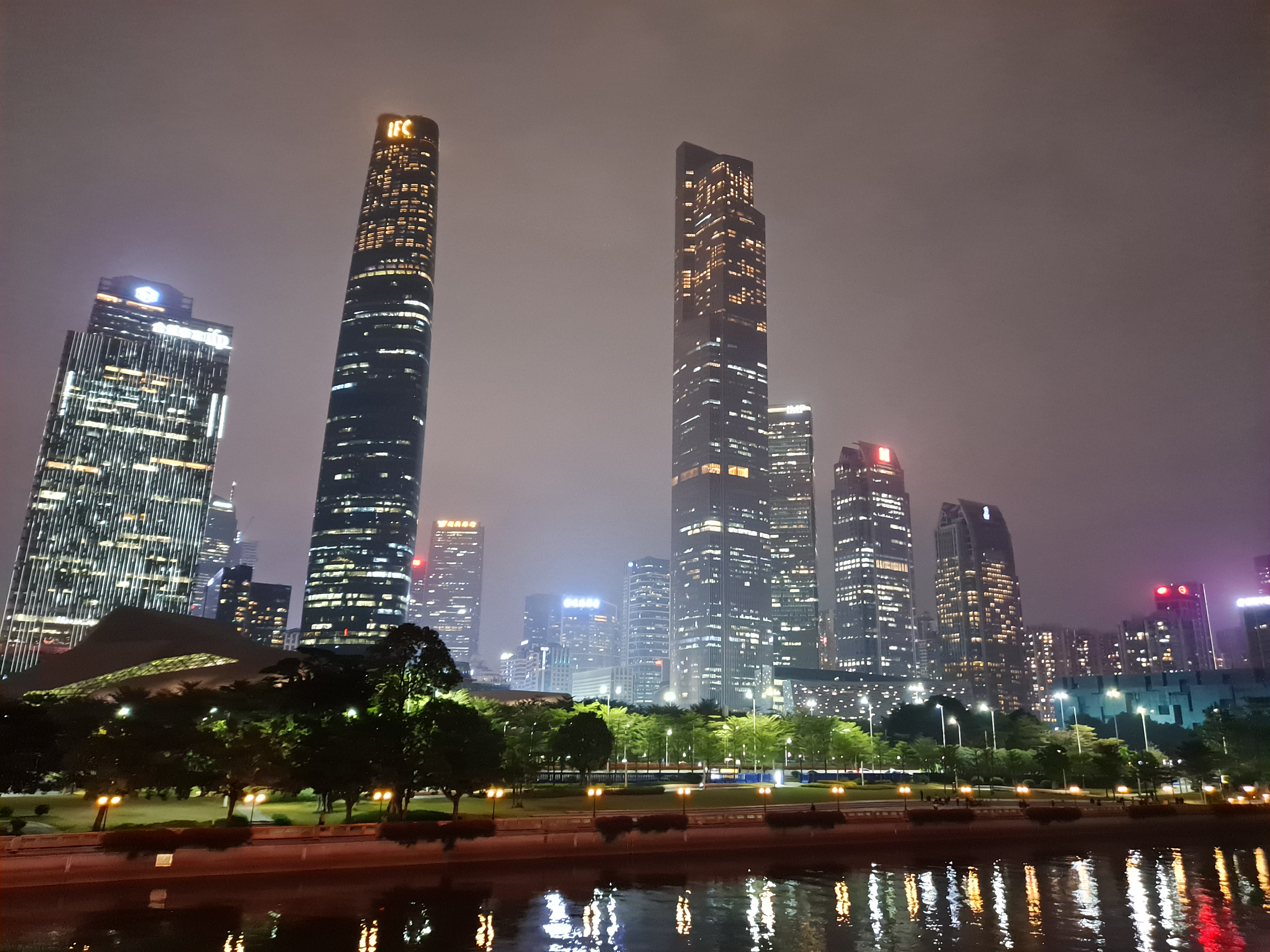
Zhujiang New Town at night

The first big project built in the district during the 1980s was the Tianhe Sports Center when the city was selected to host the Sixth National Games in 1986. The complex includes a stadium of 65,000 seats, a gymnasium and an indoor swimming pool. Its construction had a lasting impact on the development of the district. Soon other projects followed and rice fields gave way to residential complexes called xiaoqu (meaning "little districts"). The construction of xiaoqu began in the mid and late eighties and most of them had residential buildings of no more than 10 stories. Each floor was kept to no more than four units due to the lack of elevators since they would increase the construction cost. Also, due to the sheer number of residential buildings – some xiaoqu had more than 20 residential buildings – a lot of land was needed and thus converted.

The building of Guangzhou East railway station in 1990 further contributed to the growth of the district. The old Guangzhou Railway Station is 10 km (6.2 mi) to the west and was the terminus for trains to and from Beijing and Hong Kong. To relieve the traffic, the East Railroad Station was built and is now the terminus for trains to and from Hong Kong and Shenzhen.

As the district developed, the size of xiaoqu became smaller since land became more valuable and expensive. Most of the new xiaoqu now only consist of four to six residential buildings but each can contain 30 floors or more since the growth of district attracted big developers where the cost of construction (such as elevators) was no longer an issue. Also, taller residential buildings gave rise to taller office buildings.

South of the Sports Center and north of the Zhujiang River is Zhujiang New Town, home to some of Guangzhou's newest and most iconic buildings .

Several venues used for the 2010 Asian Games are located in Tianhe District.

== Economy ==
- Guangzhou Science City
- Kung Fu restaurants has its headquarters in the district
- Jinyi Cinemas has its headquarters in the district
- Chow Sang Sang's Mainland division, Chow Sang Sang (China) Company Limited
- Google has its Guangzhou office in Teemtower (天河城大厦) of Teem Plaza.
- All Nippon Airways operates its Guangzhou Office in the district. Since May 3, 2011 it has been located in Tower A of Victory Plaza. On May 2, 2011, and prior, it was located in the 2605 CITIC Plaza.
- Renren.com has its Guangzhou office in China Shine Plaza (耀中广场).
- 56.com was headquartered in Huajingyuan (华景园) in Tianhe Software Park (天河软件园) when it was an independent company.
- R&F Properties has its head office in Zhujiang New Town.
- Agile Property is in Tianhe District.
- Hopson Development was previously in Zhujiang New Town.

== Diplomatic missions ==
The Consulate General of the United States, Guangzhou is in Zhujiang New Town, Tianhe District.

== Education ==
Many of the city's colleges and universities are located in the district. They include:

- Guangzhou Sport University
- PLA Institute of Physical Education, Guangzhou
- Jinan University
- Guangdong University of Technology
- South China Agricultural University
- South China University of Technology
- South China Normal University

International schools in the district include:

- Japanese School of Guangzhou
- Huamei-Bond International College
- Guangzhou Nanfang International School

Former international schools:

- American International School of Guangzhou in The Greenery (怡苑)
- École Française Internationale de Canton in Favorview (汇景新城)

== Transportation ==
Besides the Guangzhou East railway station (referred to by locals as simply "East Station"), Tianhe is also the terminus for several Guangzhou Metro lines, and one line goes through it:

=== Metro ===
Tianhe is currently serviced by eleven metro lines operated by Guangzhou Metro:

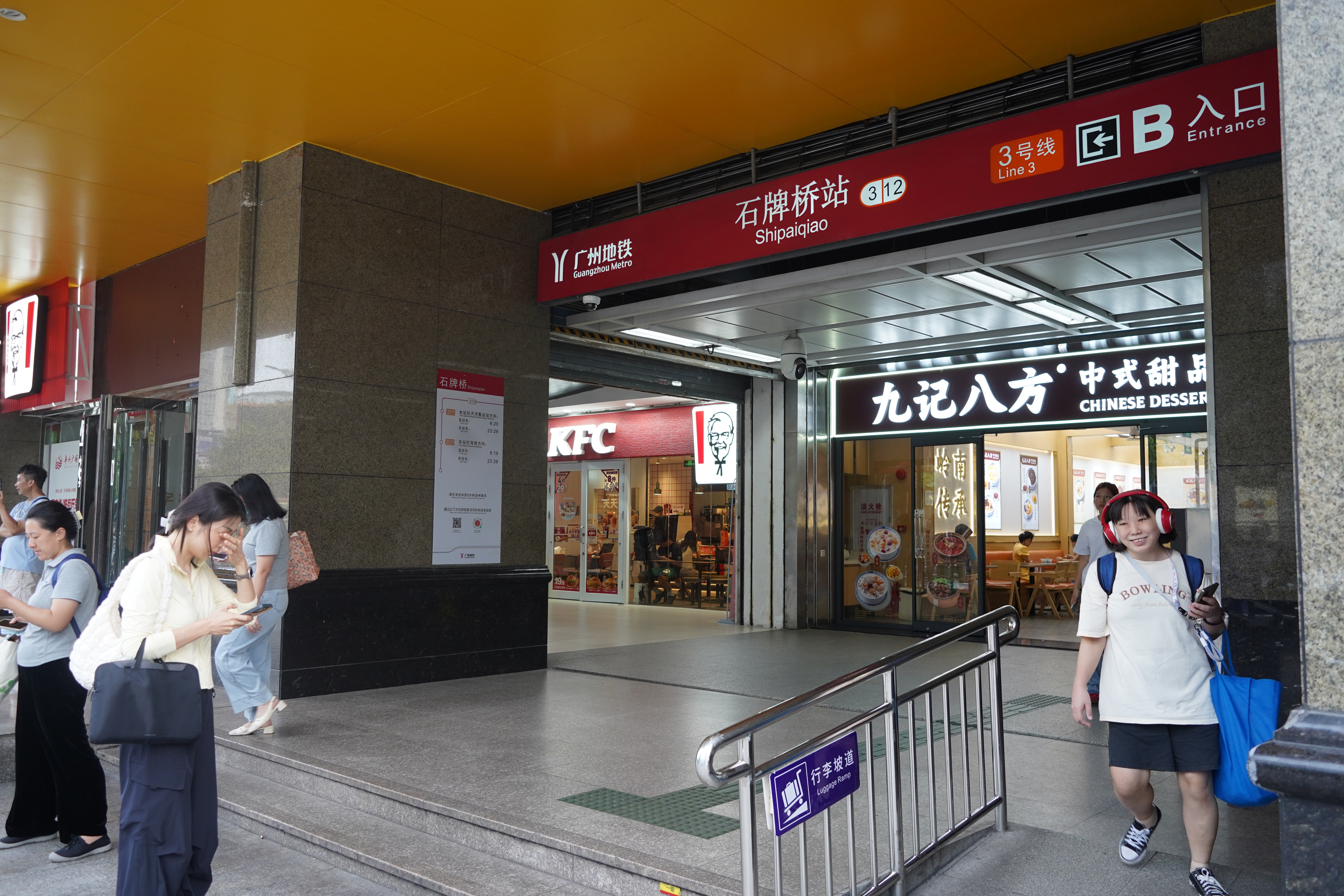
Shipaiqiao Metro Station, Exit B, 2026

- Line 1 – Tiyu Xilu ( 3 North & South), Tianhe Sports Center, Guangzhou East Station ( 3 , 11 )
- Line 3 (North Line) – Yantang ( 6 ), Guangzhou East Station ( 1 , 11 ), Linhexi ( APM ), Tiyu Xilu ( 1 3 South)
- Line 3 (South Line) – Tianhe Coach Terminal ( 6 ), Wushan, South China Normal University ( 11 ), Gangding, Shipaiqiao, Tiyu Xilu ( 1 3 North), Zhujiang New Town ( 5 )
- Line 4 – Huangcun ( 21 ), Chebei ( 13 ), Chebeinan ( 5 )
- Line 5 – Zhujiang New Town ( 3 ), Liede, Tancun, Yuancun ( 21 ), Keyun Lu, Chebeinan ( 4 ), Dongpu, Sanxi
- Line 6 – Shaheding, Shahe ( 11 ), Tianpingjia, Yantang ( 3 ), Tianhe Coach Terminal ( 3 ), Changban, Botanical Garden, Longdong, Kemulang, Gaotangshi
- Line 10 - Yangji East
- Line 11 – Shahe ( 6 ), Guangzhou East Railway Station ( 1 , 3 ), Longkou West, South China Normal University ( 3 South), Huajing Road, Tianhe Park ( 13 , 21 ), Yuancun ( 5 )
- Line 13 - Tianhe Park ( 11 , 21 ), Tangxia, Chebei ( 4 ), Tianhe Zhucun
- Line 18 – Xiancun
- Line 21 – Tianhe Park ( 11 , 13 ), Tangdong, Huangcun ( 4 ), Daguannanlu, Tianhe Smart City
- APM line – Linhexi ( 3 ), Tianhe Sports Center South, Tianhenan, Huangpu Dadao, Guangzhou Women and Children's Medical Center, Huacheng Dadao, Guangzhou Opera House, Haixinsha

== Notable buildings ==
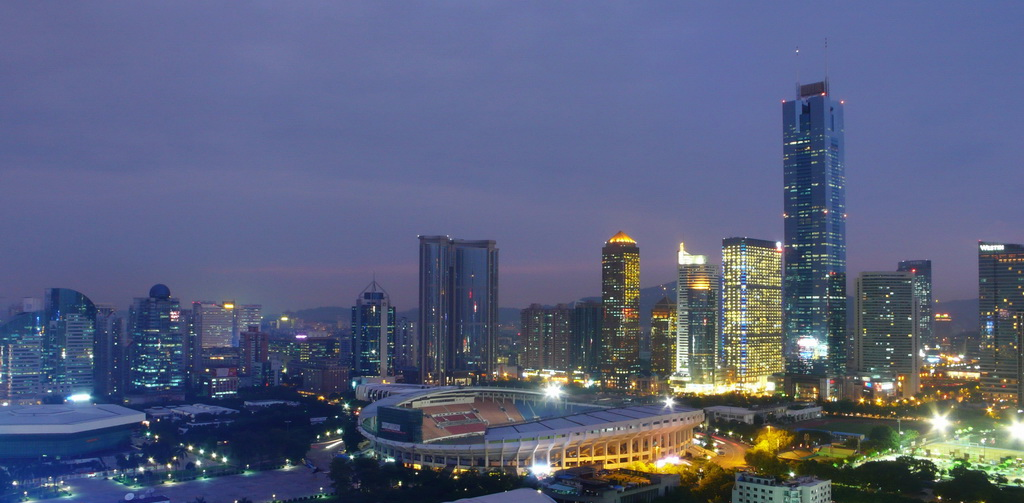
The CITIC Plaza and Tianhe Sports Center View of the Guangzhou CTF International Finance Center

- CITIC Plaza, an 80-story, 391 m (1,283 ft) skyscraper completed in 1997, situated between Tianhe Sports Center and Guangzhou East Railway Station. It was the tallest building in China then, and now it ranks as the 3rd tallest building in Guangzhou, 8th in China, 11th in Asia, and 16th worldwide.
- Pearl River Tower, a skyscraper in Zhujiang New Town, which is the first zero-energy building in China. It is owned by China Tobacco.
- Guangzhou International Finance Center, a 435 m (1,427 ft) skyscraper. It was built between 2005 and 2010.
- Guangzhou CTF Finance Center, currently the tallest building in Guangzhou.
- TeeMall (天河城), a massive and well-renowned shopping centre opened in 1996 and situated within the Tianhe District.

== See also ==
- Asteroid 188867 Tin Ho, named after the Tianhe District
