= Hopson Development =

Chinese real estate private company

Hopson Development Holdings Limited 合生创展集团有限公司
- Company type: Privately held company
- Traded as: SEHK: 754
- Industry: Real estate
- Founded: 1992
- Headquarters: Chaoyang District, Beijing, People's Republic of China
- Area served: People's Republic of China
- Key people: Chairman: Zhu Mengyi
- Number of employees: 7,001
- Website: Hopson Development Holdings Limited

Hopson Development
- Simplified Chinese: 合生创展集团有限公司
- Traditional Chinese: 合生創展集團有限公司
Transcriptions
Standard Mandarin
- Hanyu Pinyin: Héshēng Chuàng Zhǎn Jítuán Yǒuxiàngōngsī
Yue: Cantonese
- Jyutping: hap6 sang1 cong3 zin2 zaap6 tyun4 jau5 haan6 gung1 si1

Hopson Development Holdings Limited or Hopson Development (SEHK: 754), established in Guangzhou, China, in 1992, is one of the five largest real estate private companies in Guangdong Province. (The others are Country Garden, Evergrande Real Estate Group, R&F Properties and Agile Property.) It focuses on property developments, including residential property, commercial property, hotel and tourist property, and property management business, in major Mainland cities such as Guangzhou, Beijing, Tianjin and Shanghai.

It was listed on the Hong Kong Stock Exchange in 1998.

Its headquarters are in Chaoyang District, Beijing. Its headquarters were previously in Zhujiang New Town, Guangzhou.

On October 4, 2021, during the Evergrande liquidity crisis, the Cailian Press reported that Hopson Development was set to buy a 51% stake in Evergrande for around 5 billion United States dollars. However, by October 20, The Guardian reported that this value was decreased to 2.6 billion dollars, and that activity surrounding such deal with suspended following objection by the Guangdong provincial government, which is overseeing Evergrande's restructuring.

== See also ==
- Real estate in China
