= Linhe Subdistrict =

Linhe Subdistrict 林和街道
- Subdistrict
- Location in Guangdong
- Coordinates: 23°8′35″N 113°19′37″E
- Country: People's Republic of China
- Province: Guangdong
- Prefecture-level city: Guangzhou
- District: Tianhe District
- Time zone: UTC+8 (China Standard)

Linhe Subdistrict (Chinese: 林和街道; pinyin: Línhé Jiēdào) is a subdistrict in Tianhe District, Guangzhou, Guangdong, China. As of 2018, it has 13 residential communities under its administration.

== See also ==
- List of township-level divisions of Guangdong
