= Guangdong Museum of Art =

Art museum in Guangzhou, Guangdong, China

- 广东美术馆
- View of the Guangdong Museum of Art
- Established: November 28, 1997
- Location: 38 Yanyu Road, 二沙岛 Yuexiu District, Guangzhou, Guangdong Province, China, 510105
- Coordinates: 23°6′38″N 113°18′6″E
- Type: Art museum
- Director: Wang Shaoqiang
- Website: www.gdmoa.org (in Chinese)

The Guangdong Museum of Art (Chinese: 广东美术馆) is an art museum in Guangzhou, Guangdong, China.

The museum is located on Ersha Island in Guangzhou. It is a national museum of visual art. The museum's art collection concentrates on modern and contemporary Chinese art. The architectural foundation was started in December 1990, and the museum opened to the public on November 28, 1997. Since 2002, the museum has organized the Guangzhou Triennial. It has organized the Asia Biennial since 2015.

View of one of the museum galleries

The museum covers a total area of 20,000 square meters. It has a display area of over 8,000 square meters, with twelve exhibition halls. Exhibitions cover both large-scale and small-scale works of art. There is a 300-seat auditorium with projection and video facilities. The museum has been used for international academic conferences and includes educational services. It is a non-profit cultural institution.

== Bai'etan Greater Bay Area Art Centre ==
The museum opened a new venue in the Bai'etan Greater Bay Area Art Centre on 1 May 2024, designed by He Jingtang of the Chinese Academy of Engineering. This displays contemporary and international art. This new building is 78.5 meters tall, 350 meters long, and has 11 floors above ground, with two underground. The original museum building now concentrates on 20th-century Guangdong art.

== See also ==
- Guangdong Museum
- List of museums in China
