= Jinyi Cinemas =

Chinese movie theater chain

Guangzhou Jinyi Film and Television Investment Co Ltd
- Traditional Chinese: 廣州金逸影视傳媒
- Simplified Chinese: 广州金逸影视传媒股份有限公司
Transcriptions
Standard Mandarin
- Hanyu Pinyin: Guǎngzhōu Jīnyì Yǐngshì Chuánméi Gǔfènyǒuxiàngōngsī

Jinyi Cinemas (simplified Chinese: 金逸电影; traditional Chinese: 金逸電影) is a cinema operator in China, headquartered in the Leedon Sunshine Hotel (礼顿阳光大厦 Lǐdùn Yángguāng Dàshà) in Zhujiang New Town, Tianhe District, Guangzhou. As of 2004 the shares are with Guangzhou Performance Company and Guangzhou Jiayu Real Estate Development Company. Some locations are named Jinyi International Cinemas (金逸国际影城 Jīnyì Guójì Yǐngchéng).

In 2004 the company cooperated with Warner Bros. to build cinemas in South China.

In 2014 the company failed to receive an IPO.

In 2014 the company was the fifth-largest cinema chain in China by box office gross, with US$335.39 million.
