= Xinghua Subdistrict, Guangzhou =

Xinghua Subdistrict 兴华街道
- Subdistrict
- Location in Guangdong
- Coordinates: 23°09′55″N 113°21′45″E
- Country: People's Republic of China
- Province: Guangdong
- Prefecture-level city: Guangzhou
- District: Tianhe
- Village-level divisions: 9 residential communities
- Established: December 1995

Area
  - Total: 4.288 km^{2} (1.656 sq mi)
- Elevation: 33 m (108 ft)

Population
  - Total: 63,100
  - Density: 14,700/km^{2} (38,100/sq mi)
- Time zone: UTC+8 (China Standard)
- Postal code: 510507
- Area code: 0020
- Website: xinghua.thnet.gov.cn

Xinghua Subdistrict (simplified Chinese: 兴华街道; traditional Chinese: 興華街道; pinyin: Xīnghuá Jiēdào) is a subdistrict of Tianhe District, Guangzhou, People's Republic of China. As of 2011, it has two residential communities (社区) under its administration.

== Transportation ==
Yantang Station on Line 3 and Line 6 of the Guangzhou Metro is located nearby.

== See also ==
- List of township-level divisions of Guangdong
