= Ersha Island =

Island in Guangzhou, China

Coordinates: 23°06′45″N 113°18′00″E

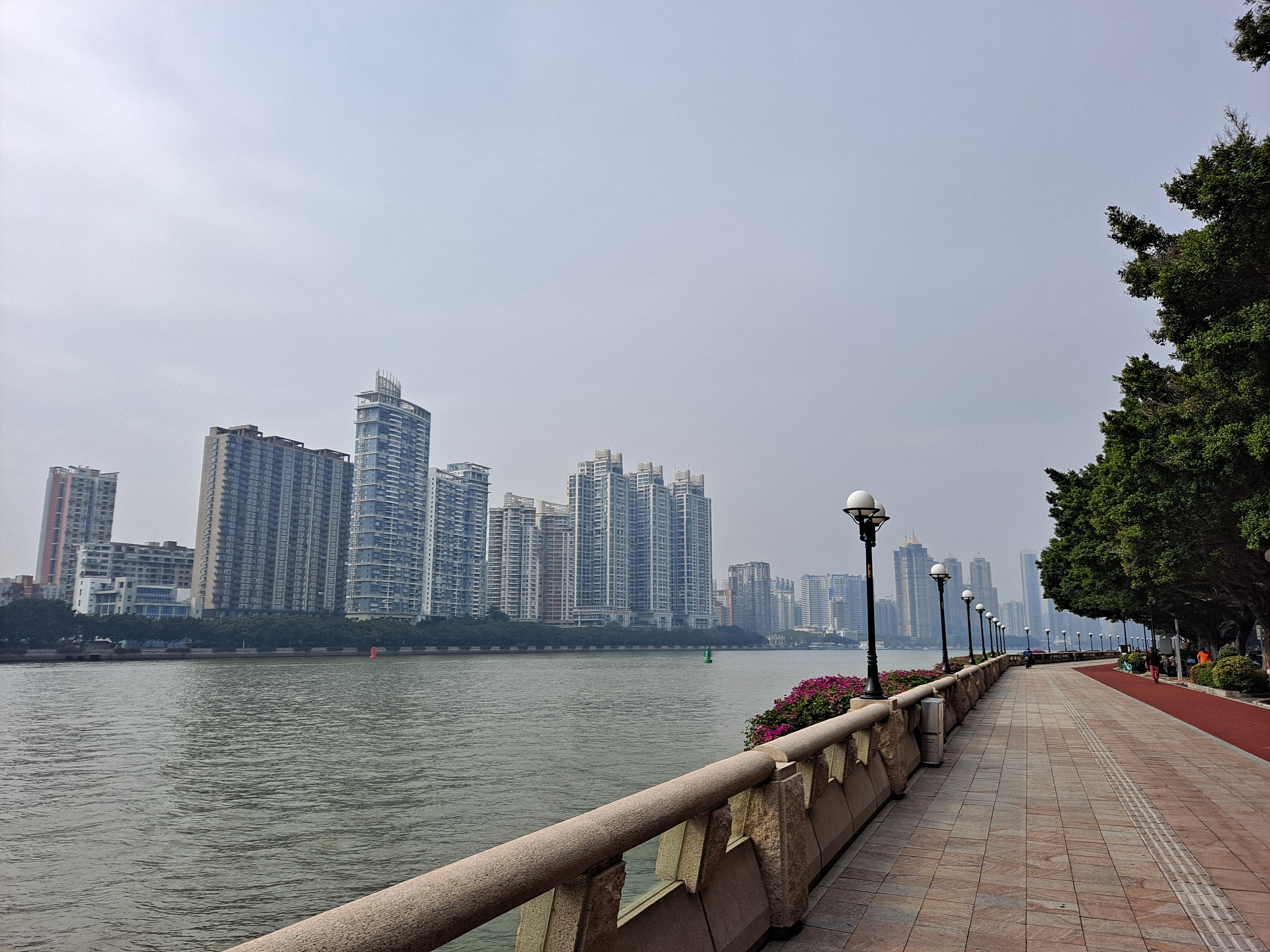
- Traditional Chinese: 二沙島
- Simplified Chinese: 二沙岛
Transcriptions
Standard Mandarin
- Hanyu Pinyin: Èrshā Dǎo
Yue: Cantonese
- Jyutping: ji6 saa1 dou2

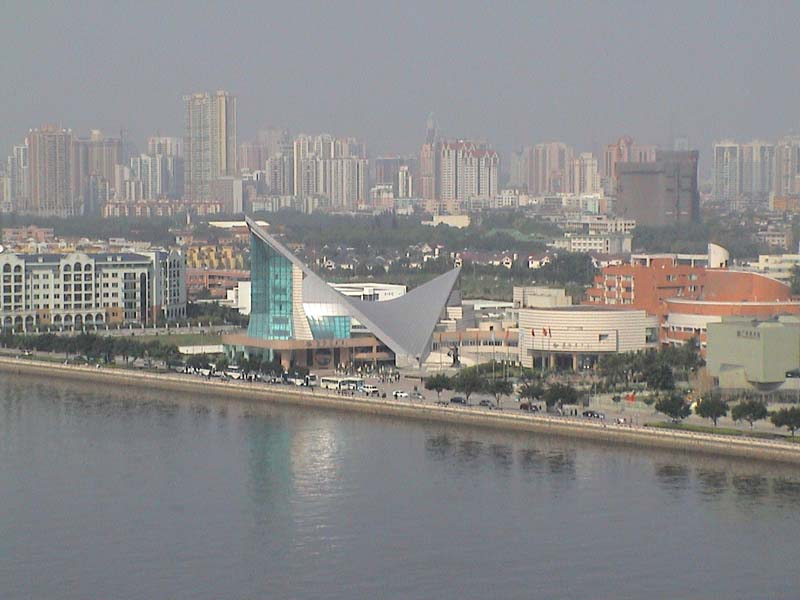
Guangdong Museum of Art and the Xinghai Music Hall on Ersha Island

Ersha Island, formerly Napier Island in English, is an island in the Yuexiu District of Guangzhou, Guangdong Province, China. It houses the American International School of Guangzhou elementary school campus, several apartment complexes, a badminton stadium, and a government sports training facility. Ersha Island is also home to the Guangdong Museum of Art and the Xinghai Concert Hall. It also contains several small parks: Chuanqi, Hong Cheng, Ershadao Sports Park, and Guangzhou Fazhan Park.

== History ==
Known to the English as Napier Island, it divides the Pearl River into two branches. On the eastern end was Napier's Fort, named after the British trade envoy to China, Lord Napier. It was a semi-circular fort of stone masonry mounting 35 guns and designed to command the passage on both sides. During the First Opium War (1839–42), British forces took possession of the fort before capturing Canton (Guangzhou) in March 1841. Before the end of the war, the Chinese rebuilt the fort, plus three extra stone forts nearby, mounting nearly 200 guns in total. During the Expedition to Canton in April 1847, the British captured 49 guns on Napier's Fort. It later became one of four forts known as the Barrier Forts, which guarded a narrow opening in the river towards Guangzhou. At the start of the Second Opium War (1856–60), the British captured these strategic locations with only slight opposition in the Battle of Canton on 23 October 1856. American forces recaptured these sites in the Battle of the Barrier Forts in November 1856.

== Education ==
Guangzhou Yuexiu Yucai Experimental School is located on the island.

American International School of Guangzhou's elementary school campus is on the island.

Previously the École Française Internationale de Canton, the French international school of Guangzhou, was located at the GoldArch Riverdale (Note: 金亚花园; 金亞花園; Jīnyà Huāyuán; gam1 aa3 faa1 jyun4*2) development on Ersha Island.

== Transport ==
Ersha Island station on Line 12 of Guangzhou Metro opened on 29 June 2025.

== See also ==
- Shamian Island
