= Guangzhou International Finance Center =

Supertall skyscraper in Guangzhou, Guangdong, China

Coordinates: 23°07′13″N 113°19′05″E

- 广州国际金融中心
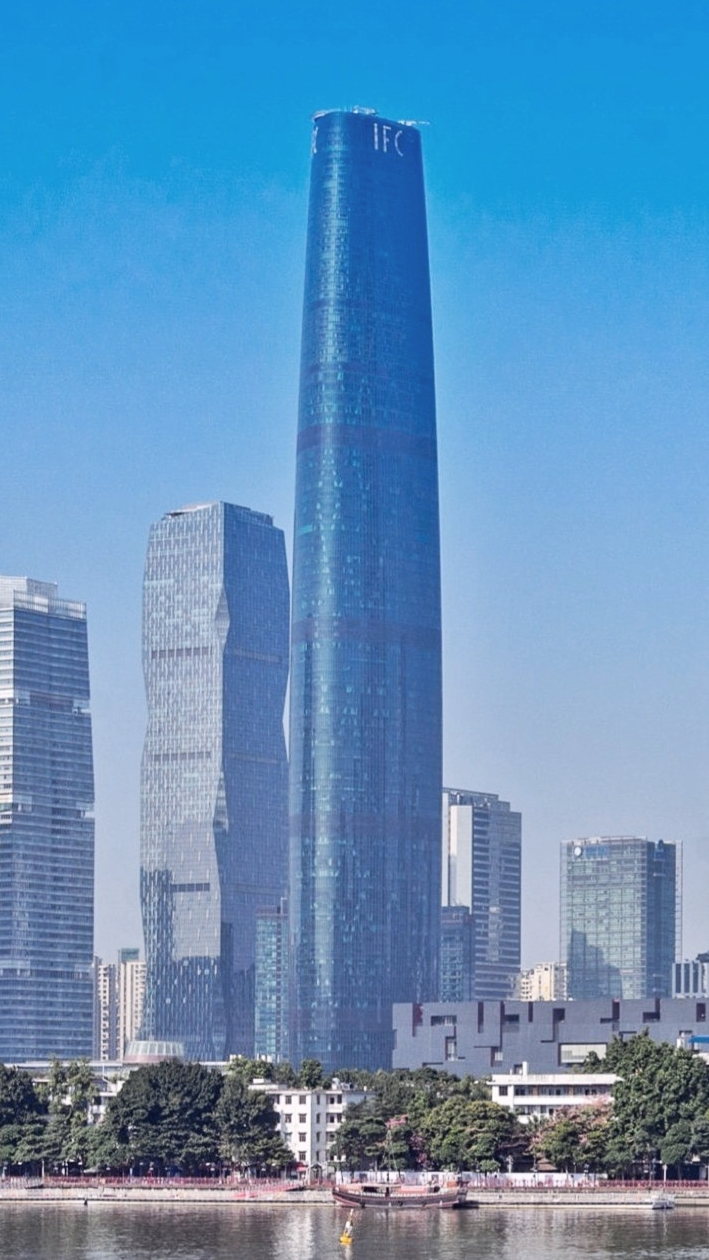
- Guangzhou International Finance Center in December 2016
- Interactive map of the Guangzhou International Finance Center area

General information
- Status: Completed
- Type: Hotel; Commercial offices
- Architectural style: Modern
- Location: 5 Zhujiang Avenue West; Zhujiang New Town, Tianhe District, Guangzhou, Guangdong, China
- Construction started: 26 December 2005
- Completed: 28 April 2010 – 31 October 2010
- Opening: 28 February 2010
- Cost: GB£280 million or US$ 365 million

Height
- Architectural: 438.6 m (1,439 ft)
- Roof: 438.6 m (1,439 ft)
- Top floor: 415.1 m (1,362 ft)
- Observatory: 415.1 m (1,362 ft)

Technical details
- Floor count: 103 +4 below ground
- Floor area: 250,095 m^{2} (2,692,000 sq ft)
- Lifts/elevators: 71

Design and construction
- Architect: WilkinsonEyre
- Structural engineer: Arup; Architecture Design Institute of South China University of Technology
- Main contractor: China State Construction; Guangzhou Municipal Construction Group JV

Other information
- Number of rooms: 374

Guangzhou International Finance Center
- Traditional Chinese: 廣州國際金融中心
- Simplified Chinese: 广州国际金融中心
Transcriptions
Standard Mandarin
- Hanyu Pinyin: Guǎngzhōu Guójì Jīnróng Zhōngxīn
Yue: Cantonese
- Jyutping: gwong2 zau1 gwok3 zai3 gam1 jung4 zung1 sam1

Guangzhou West Tower
- Traditional Chinese: 廣州西塔
- Simplified Chinese: 广州西塔
Transcriptions
Standard Mandarin
- Hanyu Pinyin: Guǎngzhōu Xītǎ
Yue: Cantonese
- Jyutping: gwong^{2}zau^{1} sai^{1}taap^{3}

Guangzhou International Finance Center or Guangzhou West Tower, is a 103-story, 438.6 m (1,439 ft) skyscraper at Zhujiang Avenue West in the Tianhe District of Guangzhou, Guangdong. One half of the Guangzhou Twin Towers, it is the 24th tallest building in the world, completed in 2010. As of 2023, it is the world's tallest building with a rooftop helipad, at 438 m high. The world's second-tallest building with a rooftop helipad was also completed in 2010: Beijing's China World Trade Center Tower III, whose roof-top helipad is 330 m high. Both buildings are taller than the U.S. Bank Tower, the previous record-holder from 1989 to 2010, whose roof-top helipad is 310.3 m (1,018 ft) high.

Construction of the building, designed by WilkinsonEyre, broke ground in December 2005, and was completed in 2010. The building is used as a conference center, hotel and office building. Floors 1 through 66 are used as offices, floors 67 and 68 are for mechanical equipment, floors 69 to 98 have a Four Seasons Hotel with the lobby being on the 70th floor, and floors 99 and 100 are used as an observation deck.

The building was previously known as Guangzhou West Tower and had a related project, the proposed Guangzhou East Tower, which, at 475 m (1,558 ft), would have been even taller, though that project has been awarded to a different design by Kohn Pedersen Fox, the 530 m (1,740 ft) Guangzhou CTF Finance Center.

The building was the winner of the RIBA 2012 Lubetkin Prize.

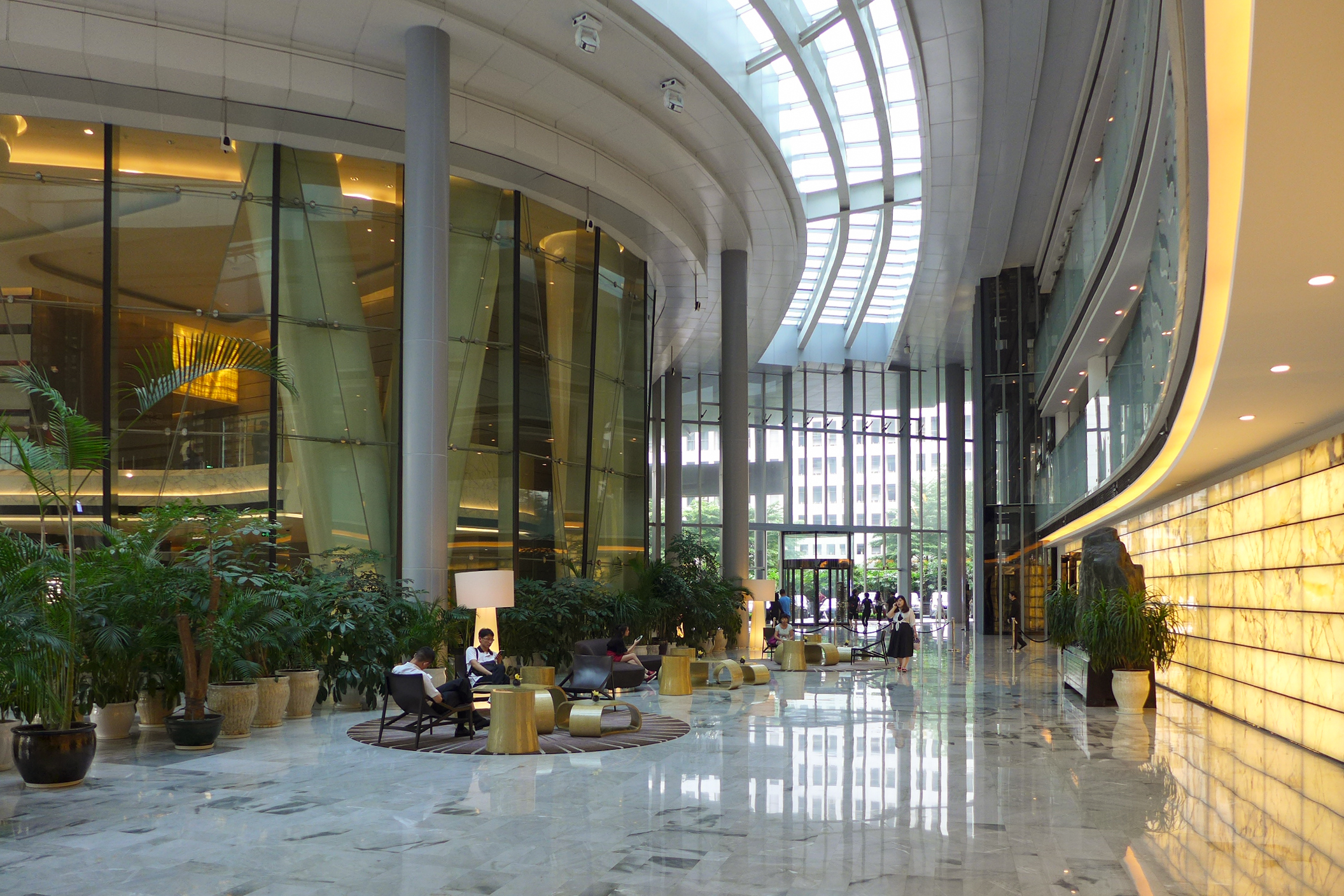
Lobby

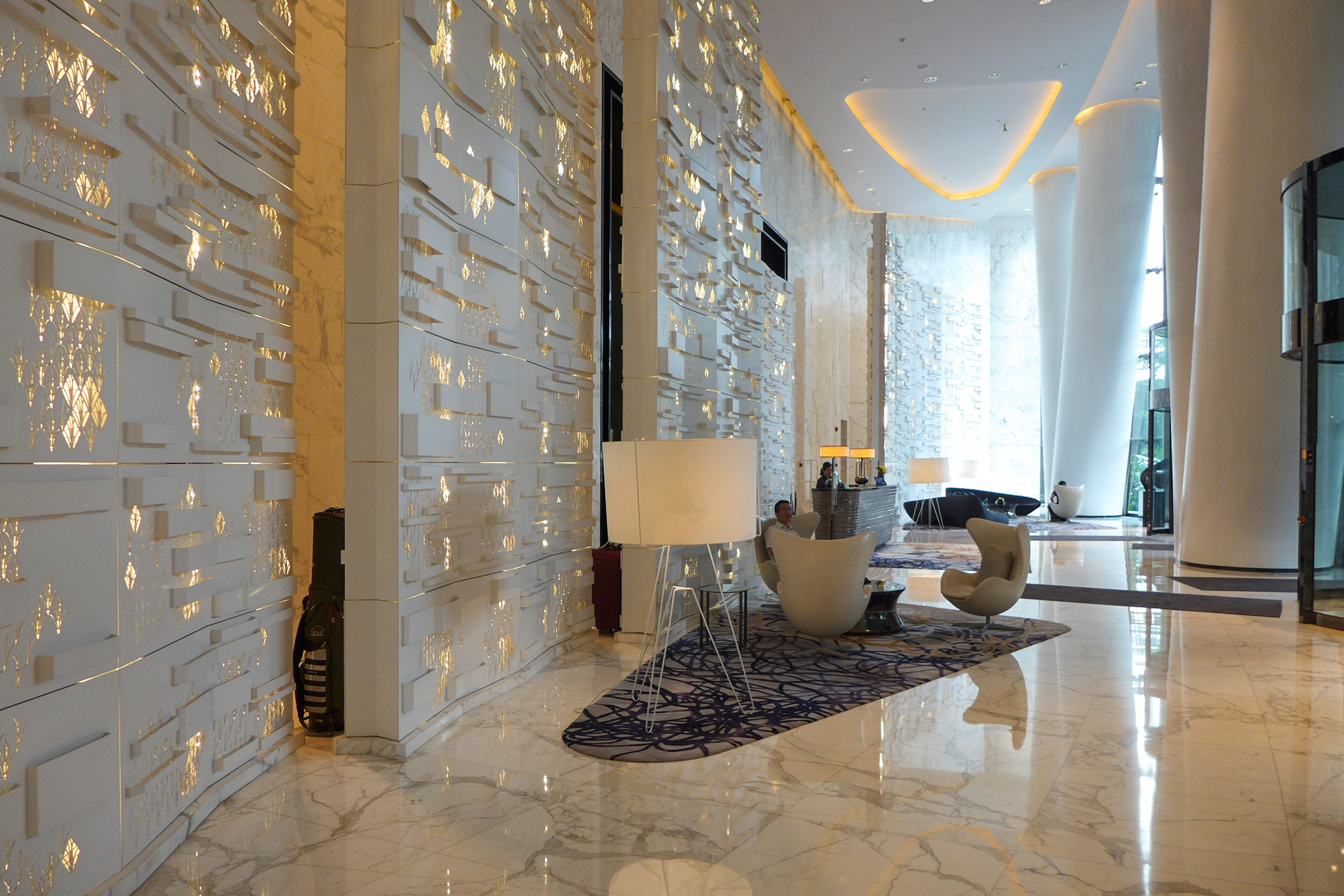
Four Seasons Hotel Lobby

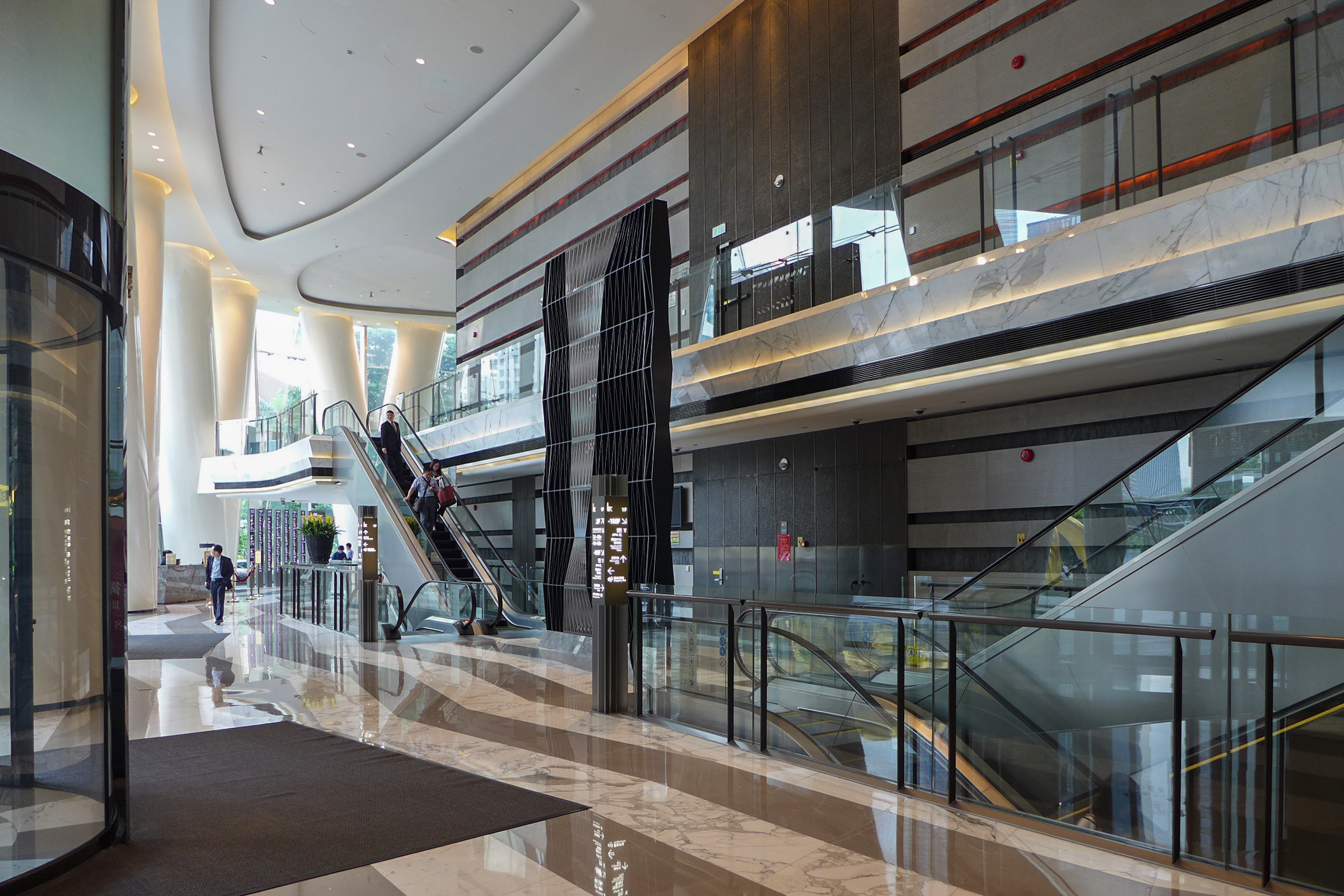
Office Lobby

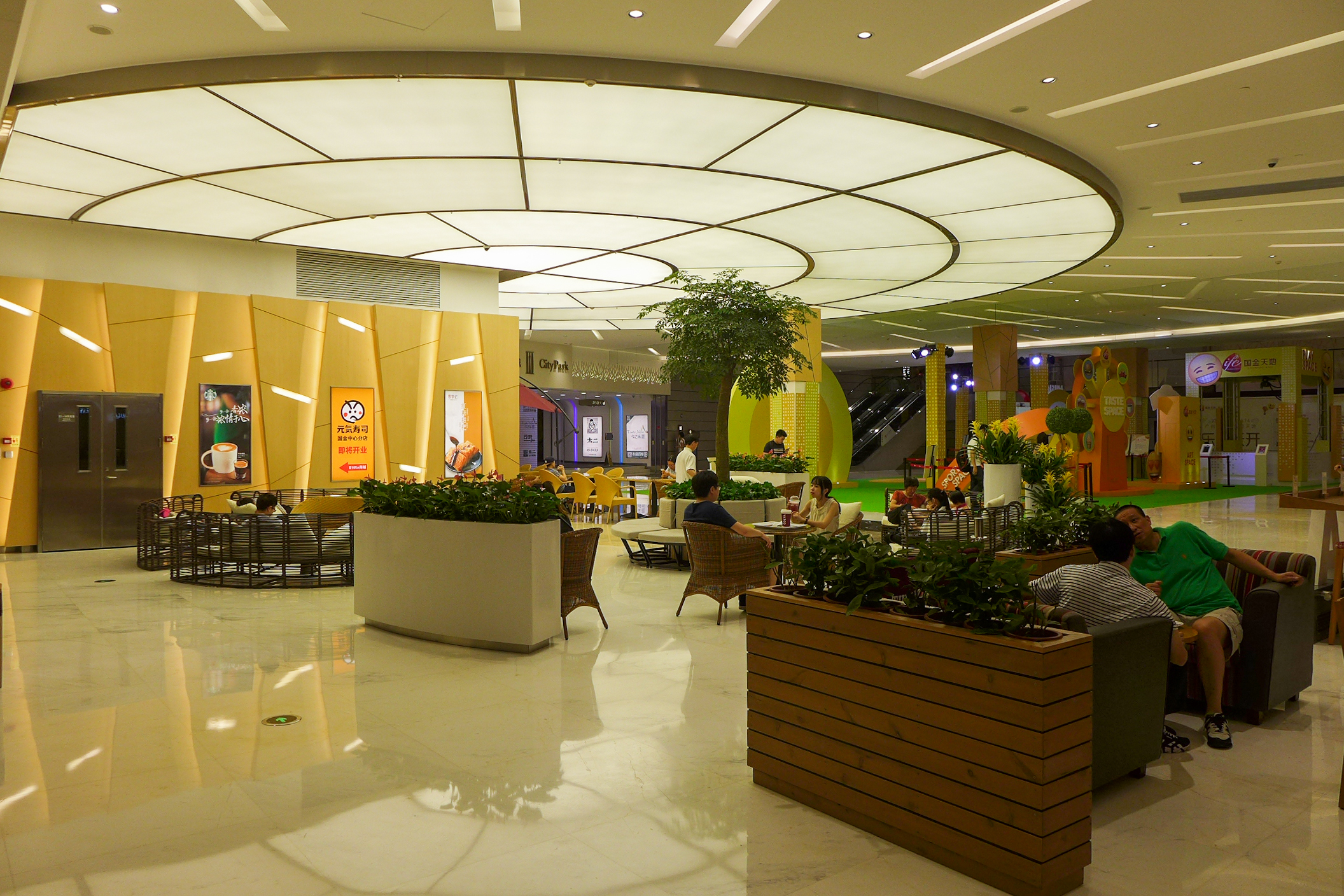
Basement Arcade

== See also ==
- Diagrid
- List of tallest buildings in Guangzhou
- List of buildings with 100 floors or more
