= Agile Property =

Chinese company

Agile Property Holdings Limited
- Native name: 雅居乐地产控股有限公司
- Company type: Public company
- Industry: Real estate
- Founded: 1985
- Headquarters: Tianhe District, Guangzhou, Guangdong, People's Republic of China
- Area served: People's Republic of China
- Key people: Chairman: Mr. Chen Zhuolin; Vice-Chairlady and Co-President: Ms. Luk Sin Fong, Fion; Vice-Chairman and Co-President: Mr. Chan Cheuk Yin; Executive Director and Senior Vice-President: Mr. Chan Cheuk Hung, Mr. Chan Cheuk Nam, Mr. Chan Cheuk Hei
- Website: Agile Property Holdings

Agile Property Holdings Limited
- Simplified Chinese: 雅居乐地产控股有限公司
- Traditional Chinese: 雅居樂地產控股有限公司
Transcriptions
Standard Mandarin
- Hanyu Pinyin: Yǎjūlè Dìchǎn Kònggǔ Yǒuxiàngōngsī
Yue: Cantonese
- Jyutping: ngaa5 geoi1 lok6 dei6 caan2 hung3 gu2 jau5 haan6 gung1 si1

Agile Property Holdings Limited (Chinese: 雅居乐地产控股有限公司; pinyin: Yǎjūlè dìchǎn kònggǔ yǒuxiàn gōngsī) SEHK: 3383 is a land developer with its business focused in Guangdong Province, China. It was established in 1985 as a furniture maker in Zhongshan City, and entered the property business in 1992. On December 15, 2005, Agile Property was listed on the Hong Kong Stock Exchange.

Its headquarters are in Tianhe District, Guangzhou.

== Introduction ==
Agile Property Holdings Limited was set up in 1992 as a property development company in China. It has developed over time into a diversified conglomerate in China. In 2005, Agile Property was listed on the Hong Kong Stock Exchange. The proposed price range for listing was HK$3.00 to 3.30. Due to strong demand by investors for access to the China property market, it was finally priced at the high end of the range. The initial public offering size was US $403.5 million. The listing date was December 15, 2005.

As of close 2017, Agile had revenues of RMB 51.6 billion.

== Diversified business ==
Agile has integrated its diverse business operations over time into the following 6 key business focuses:

- Property Development
- A-Living
- Environment Protection
- Education
- Construction
- Hotel Operations

== Listings ==
Agile is listed on the Hong Kong Stock Exchange with exchange code 3383. It is constituent stock of the following indexes:

- Hang Seng Composite Index

== See also ==
- Real estate in China
