= American International School of Guangzhou =

Coordinates: 23.109793°N 113.304212°E

- 广州美国人国际学校

Location
- Elementary Campus: No. 3 Yan Yu Street, Ersha Island, Guangzhou, China; Secondary School Campus: No. 19 Kexiang Road, Huangpu District, Science Park, Guangzhou, China

Information
- Type: Private School
- Established: 1981
- CEEB code: 694519
- Director: Kevin Baker
- Enrollment: 1,027
- Colors: Red, white & blue
- Athletics conference: APAC; SDRC; PRC; ACAMIS
- Mascot: Rams
- Website: www.aisgz.org

American International School of Guangzhou
- Simplified Chinese: 广州美国人国际学校
- Traditional Chinese: 廣州美國人國際學校
Transcriptions
Standard Mandarin
- Hanyu Pinyin: Guǎngzhōu Měiguórén Guójì Xuéxiào
Yue: Cantonese
- Jyutping: gwong2 zau1 mei5 gwok3 jan4 gwok3 zai3 hok6 haau6

The American International School of Guangzhou (AISG, Chinese: 广州美国人国际学校) is a non-profit, independent and co-educational day school for international students from pre-kindergarten to grade 12. It is located in Guangzhou, Guangdong, China, with an elementary school campus on Ersha Island, Yuexiu District and a secondary school campus in Science Park, Huangpu District. It is South China's oldest international school, having opened in 1981. AISG provides a global curriculum based on American educational standards and principles.

== History ==
AISG was founded in 1981 under the auspices of the U.S. Consulate. Originally named the American School of Guangzhou (ASG), its purpose was to educate the American children of consular employees. The first year, seven students attended classes taught by volunteer teachers in the Dong Fang Hotel (東方賓館). The aim was to enable students to integrate smoothly into the American educational system when they returned to their home country. The children of other consulates' employees were soon admitted and the school relocated to the Garden Hotel in 1985. In 1994, with over one hundred students from 21 nations, ASG moved into a purpose-built school in the Greenery, a housing estate in the Tianhe District. The school expanded to include high school (grades 9 through 12) during the 1996–97 academic year, and its first three graduates received their diplomas in 1998.

ASG was reorganized legally in 1998 as a non-profit corporation in the United States, which then contracted with the school entity registered in China for the provision of educational services. As part of this process, the school changed its name to the American International School of Guangzhou and gained official recognition by the People's Republic of China as a school serving expatriate children.

In 2001, AISG received authorization from the International Baccalaureate Organization (IBO) to offer the IB Diploma Programme. In August 2002, AISG moved to a new, purpose-built facility on Ersha Island, and in 2004 received permission from the IBO to offer the Primary Years Program. Grades K–12 were all housed at the Ersha Campus until 2007, when the middle school and high school divisions moved to a separate, purpose-built campus in Science Park, a district in eastern Guangzhou. AISG's Early Childhood Center, which teaches pre-kindergarten and kindergarten students from age 3, was added to the Ersha campus site at this time.

== Facilities ==
Elementary Campus on Ersha Island

There are two campuses: Ersha Island Campus (二沙岛校区) and Science Park Campus (科技城校区).

== Athletics ==
=== Asia Pacific Activities Conference sports and Performing Arts ===
AISG is a member of the Asia Pacific Activities Conference. APAC includes 12 international schools in the Asia-Pacific area.

APAC sponsors athletic and fine/performing arts events throughout the school year. For each event, Upper Secondary students from participating schools travel to a designated school and are housed by host families. APAC athletics include basketball, volleyball, soccer, badminton, tennis, table tennis, baseball, softball, rugby, cross country, swimming, and track and field. Performing arts activities include orchestra, choir, dance, band, and theatre.

== Notable alumni ==
- Taco Hemingway, Polish rapper
