= Antenna Interface Standards Group =

The Antenna Interface Standards Group (commonly referred to as AISG) is a non-profit international consortium formed by collaboration between communication infrastructure manufacturers and network operators with the purpose of maintaining and developing a standard for digital remote control and monitoring of antenna line devices in the wireless industry. The consortium was established in November 2001 with five original members, and as of March 2019 had 45 worldwide members based in North America, Asia, Europe, and the South Pacific. The consortium has released four versions of its base communication standard, AISG v1.0, AISG v1.1, AISG v2.0 and AISG v3.0. The consortium has also released stand alone standards that specify details related to its base standard. These standards include a standard for the connector used in AISG RS-485 based bus, standard for RF connector markings on the antenna faceplate and standards for distributing software and configuration files wrapped in XML. All published AISG standards can be downloaded from the AISG webpage.

== Latest news ==
AISG v3.0 standard was publicly released in November 2018 and has been frequently updated afterwards.

2022: AISG has been working on, and is about to release a new standard for antenna location and orientation sensor (ALS)

== AISG v3.0 overview ==
=== Background ===
AISG v2 standard was released more than 10 years ago. During this time base station sites and antenna line devices on site have evolved to be more complex.

Examples of features missing from the AISG v2 standard that modern base station sites require:

- Capability to control multi band multi array base station antenna with several base stations
- Capability to share a multi band multi array band base station antenna between two or more operators
- Ability to associate antenna arrays and other antenna line equipment to each other
- Ability to know the performance and parameters of each antenna array on site
- Tools that help in ensure correct connection of RF cables on site

Experience with AISG v2 has shown that improvements in the way the standard is written were needed to ensure more uniform standard implementation between antenna vendors (secondary's) and OEM vendors (primary's). Interoperability testing is another area where experience has shown that an interoperability testing is an area where improved standard with better support for it would be beneficial.

=== Targets ===
AISG v3.0 has been designed to address the above challenges.

== AISG v3.0 new features ==
=== Platform ===
A standardized platform that allows ALD (Antenna Line Device) vendors to create antenna line devices that contain different types of subunits which work together well and are easy to install and operate. This platform supports modern complex base station sites and easy fault finding in the field.

=== Improved specification ===
Differing AISG v2 implementations from different vendors have shown the need for more detailed specification.

ASIG v3.0 includes:

- Definitions for the primary requirements
- Extensive precise pseudocode to ensure uniform implementation by different vendors
- Much improved document structure

=== Multi-primary support ===
Support for ALDs that can be controlled by more than one primary. Devices supporting this feature are called Multi-primary ALDs (MALD). This feature includes the capability to configure the access rights of each of the connected primaries to each of the subunits contained within the ALD. To help sharing equipment between operators the multi primary support also includes the ability to configure which primaries can do this configuration and which can update the software of the MALD.

=== Site mapping ===
Site Mapping provides a set of commands that allows the primary to discover the relationships between ALDs present on the AISG bus, their capabilities and their internal connections. It enables the primary to discover details such as:

- Which RET controls each logical array within an antenna
- Frequency ranges supported by logical arrays within an antenna
- RF port connections to logical arrays within an antenna
- Relationships between sensors and logical arrays within an antenna
- Relationships between base station RF ports and connected logical arrays within an antenna
- Relationships between RF paths and controlled subunits, such as RETs and tower mounted amplifiers (TMAs)

=== Ping ===
An optional feature called Ping enables the automatic discovery of RF cable connections between ALDs and base station radios. It also enables the operators to identify RF cables that are incorrectly connected or missing.

=== Enhanced interoperability testing ===
Experience of AISG v2 shows that interoperability testing (IOT) needed to be improved. AISG v3.0 standards contain commands and hardware testing definitions to facilitate IOT to improve the quality of testing. These features ensure the devices adhere to the AISG v3.0 standards.

=== Existing functions from AISG v2 ===
AISG v3.0 also includes features that existed already in AISG v2.0, i.e. control of antenna tilt actuators (RETs) and control and monitoring of TMAs. The extension standards that exist for AISG v2.0 will be implemented to AISG v3.0 as subunit type standards gradually. Such subunit type standards will include RAE (eAntenna), GLS (Geographic Location Sensor) and ASD (Alignment Sensor Device).

== AISG protocol ==
AISG protocol is based on half duplex communication and HDLC protocol. The AISG bus is a single master multi slave bus. Communication media can be either RS-485 based using a dedicated cable specified in the AISG standard or OOK carrier injected into the RF antenna feeder cable of a base station site. The master controlling the communication is called a primary and the slave devices on the bus are called secondaries and ALDs. Primary functionality can be integrated into a base station. Primary can also be a stand alone controller installed on the BTS site or a handheld / portable controller typically used during the installation of a base station site. Secondary device types include a RET (actuator tilting antenna beam electronically), a TMA (Tower Mounted Amplifier), a GLS (Geographic Location Sensor) or an ASD (Alignment Sensor Device).

== Data ==
Basic baud rate used by the AISG bus is 9.6 kbit/s. When using a separate cable for AISG communication, the data is transmitted using RS-485 protocol. When the RF antenna feeder cable is used for AISG communication, OOK carrier with frequency is 2.176 MHz is injected into the feeder cable using Bias-Ts.

== Connector ==
An 8 pin circular connector is used to connect (or daisy chain) AISG devices. AISG consortium has released C485 standard for this RS-485 connector. This standard specifies the mechanical dimensions of the connector more tightly than the previously used standard (IEC 60130-9 - Ed. 3.0 standard with screw-ring locking ring). The C485 standard also specifies the IP rating of this connector to be IP68. This new standard was created to avoid connection problems between connectors from different manufacturers.

== Power ==
In AISG v2.0 the 8-pin connector has dedicated DC power pins for +12V, 10–30V and −48V DC. Typically the 10–30V DC pin is used to power the secondary devices.

In AISG v3.0 the 8-pin connector has only one pin dedicated for DC power, the 10–30V pin.

== AISG v2.0 Features ==
AISG v2.0 standard features include setting the antenna beam tilt, setting the gain of the tower mounted amplifier and monitoring the health of the tower mounted amplifier electronics.
