= Guangzhou Huamei International School =

International school in Guangzhou, China

- 广州市华美英语实验学校

- The school campus in 2001

Location
- 23 Huamei Road, Longdong; Tianhe District; Guangzhou, Guangdong, 510520; China; 23°12′06″N 113°22′45″E

Information
- Type: Private boarding school
- Established: June 19, 1993; 33 years ago
- Founder: Zhang Keqiang and colleagues
- Grades: Kindergarten–high school
- Gender: Coeducational
- Language: Chinese and English
- Campus size: Over 160,000 square metres
- Website: en.hm163.com

Guangzhou Huamei International School (simplified Chinese: 广州市华美英语实验学校; traditional Chinese: 廣州市華美英語實驗學校) is an international school in Tianhe District, Guangzhou, China. It provides both a Chinese curriculum and an Ontario, Canada curriculum, allowing students to earn diplomas from both systems. It was previously known as Huamei-Bond International College (HBIC; simplified Chinese: 华美中加高中; traditional Chinese: 華美中加高中).

== History ==
Guangzhou Huamei English Experimental School (广州华美英语实验学校) was established in June 1993 by Zhang Keqiang (张克强) and four people who had studied abroad and returned to China. It is a boarding school that uses bilingual instruction in English and Chinese. In the school's initial semester, it had 89 students. In 2003, it occupied a campus that spanned more than 160,000 m^{2} (0.062 sq mi), of which 90,000 m^{2} (0.035 sq mi) was building space. That year, it had over 500 teachers and staff who served 2,500 students. The school had 506 students in 2015.
