= Zhujiang New Town station =

Guangzhou Metro interchange station

Coordinates: 23.1198°N 113.3212°E

Zhujiang New Town 珠江新城
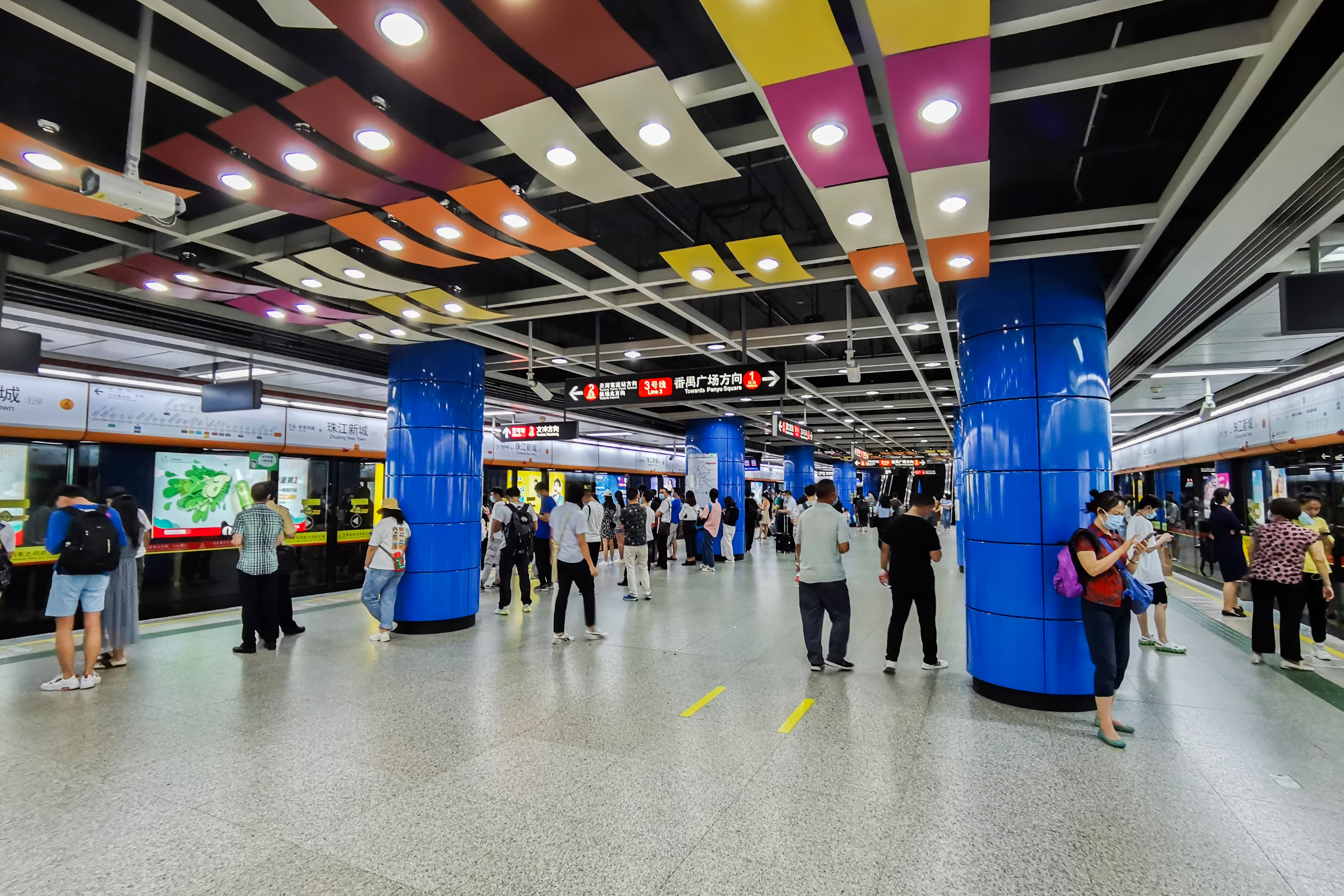
- Line 3 platform

Chinese name
- Chinese: 珠江新城站
- Literal meaning: Pearl River New Town station
Transcriptions
Standard Mandarin
- Hanyu Pinyin: Zhūjiāng Xīngchéng Zhàn
Yue: Cantonese
- Yale Romanization: Jyūgōng Sāngsìhng Jaahm
- Jyutping: Zyu^{1}gong^{1} San^{1}sing^{4} Zaam^{6}

General information
- Location: Huaxia Road (华夏路) and Huacheng Avenue (花城大道); Tianhe District, Guangzhou, Guangdong; China
- Operated by: Guangzhou Metro Co. Ltd.
- Lines: Line 3; Line 5
- Platforms: 4 (1 island platform and 2 side platforms)
- Tracks: 4

Construction
- Structure type: Underground
- Accessible: Yes

Other information
- Station code: 310 513

History
- Opened: 26 December 2005; 20 years ago (Line 3); 28 December 2005; 20 years ago (Line 5)

Services
Preceding station	Guangzhou Metro	Following station
Canton Tower towards Haibang	Line 3	Tiyu Xilu towards Airport North (Terminal 2) or Tianhe Coach Terminal
Wuyangcun towards Jiaokou	Line 5	Liede towards Huangpu New Port
Location

Zhujiang New Town Station (Chinese: 珠江新城站; Cantonese Yale: Jyūgōng Sānsìhng Jaahm) is an interchange station between Line 3 and Line 5 of the Guangzhou Metro. It started operations on 26 December 2005 and is located under the junction of Huaxia Road (华夏路) and Huacheng Avenue (花城大道) in Zhujiang New Town, Tianhe District, Guangzhou.

== Station layout ==
G	Street level	Exit
L1; Concourse	Lobby	Ticket Machines, Customer Service, Shops, Police Station, Safety Facilities
L2; Platforms	Buffer Area	Buffer area of Line 5
L2; Platforms	Platform 2	3 towards Tianhe Coach Terminal or Airport North (Tiyu Xilu)
L2; Platforms	Island platform, doors will open on the left
L2; Platforms	Platform 1	3 towards Haibang (Canton Tower)
L3; Platforms	Side platform, doors will open on the right
L3; Platforms	Platform 4	5 towards Jiaokou (Wuyangcun)
L3; Platforms	Platform 3	5 towards Huangpu New Port (Liede)
L3; Platforms	Side platform, doors will open on the right

== Exits ==
Exit number		Exit location
Exit A	A1	Huaxia Lu
Exit A	A2	Huacheng Dadao
Exit B	B1	Huaxia Lu
Exit B	B2	Huacheng Dadao
Exit C		Huaxia Lu
Exit D		Huacheng Dadao

== Gallery ==
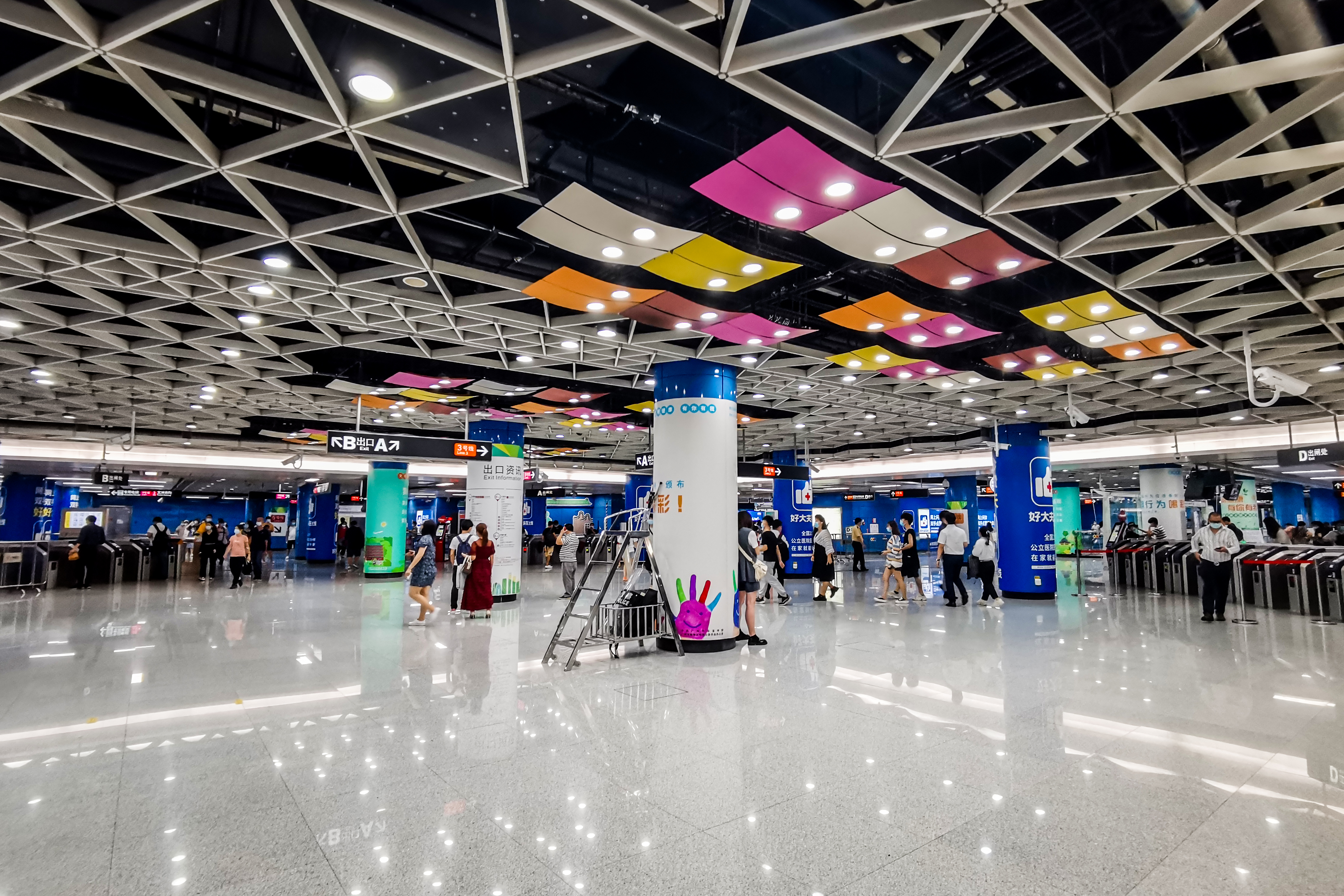
Concourse

== See other ==
- Zhujiang New Town
