= Zhujiang New Town =

Area in Guangzhou, Guangdong, China

Coordinates: 23°7′22″N 113°19′9″E

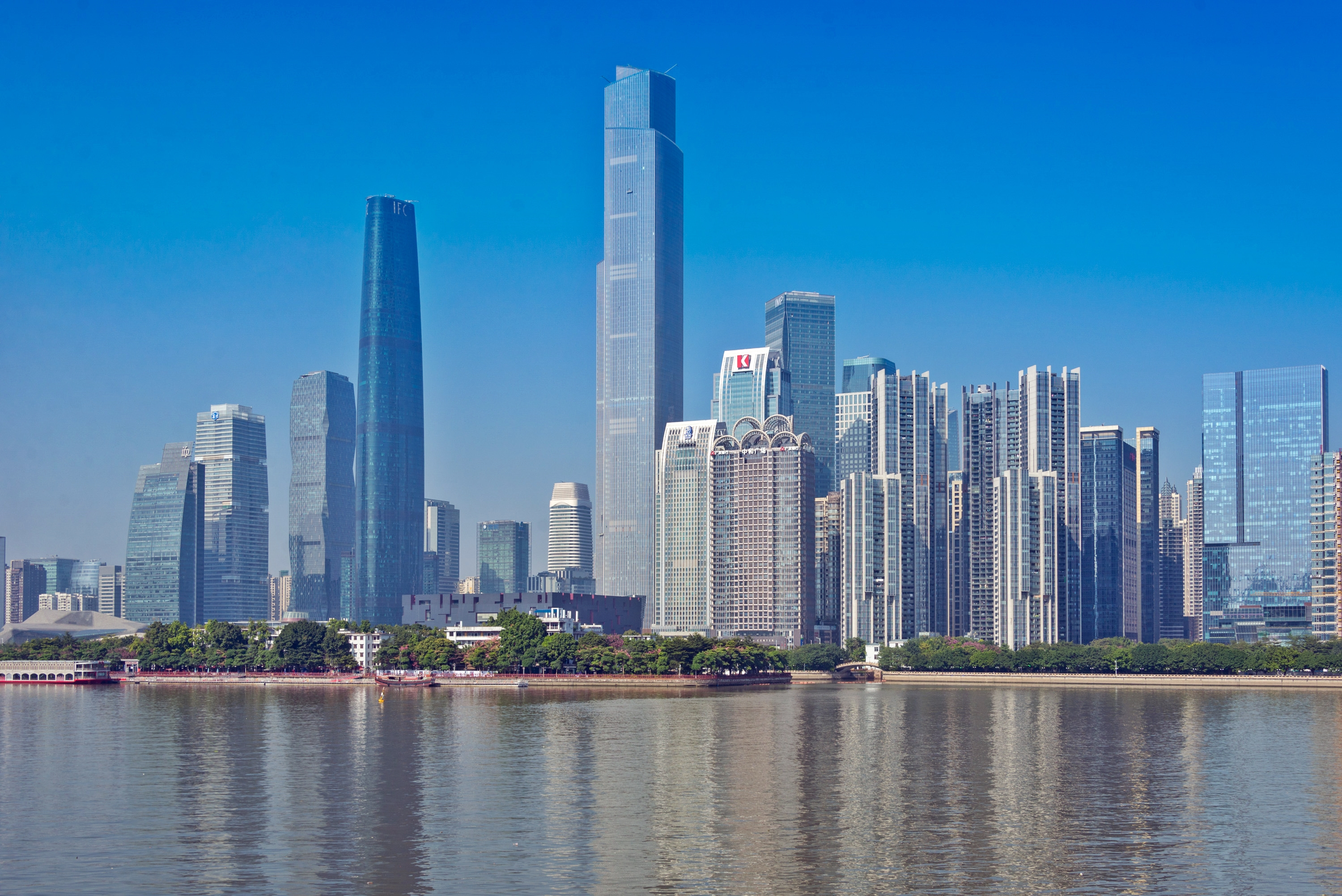
- Chinese: 珠江新城
- Literal meaning: Pearl River New City
Transcriptions
Standard Mandarin
- Hanyu Pinyin: Zhūjiāng Xīnchéng
Yue: Cantonese
- Jyutping: Zyu1gong1 San1sing4

Zhujiang New Town or Zhujiang New City is a central business district in Tianhe District, Guangzhou city, Guangdong province, China. It is bounded by Huangpu Avenue on the north, the Pearl River on the south, Guangzhou Avenue on the west and the South China Expressway on the east.

Covering an area of 6.44 km^{2} (2.49 sq mi), it is divided by Xiancun Road (Chinese: 冼村路) into two parts. The larger eastern area mainly contains high-rise residential apartment buildings; its center Zhujiang Park, modeled on New York City's Central Park.

The western portion of Zhujiang New Town was planned as the city's new CBD for the 21st century. Its core area, which the government designated as the city's new axis of development, comprises continuous open plazas which extends approximately 1.5 kilometers (0.93 mi) from Huangpu Avenue to the Pearl River. These plazes incorporate underground shopping malls, vehicular tunnels and a people mover system. Flanked by skyscrapers, at its southern end it also hosts the four newly built cultural venues of the city: the Guangzhou Opera House, the second Children's Palace, the new Guangzhou Library and the Guangdong Museum. Immediately to the north of these four buildings are the supertall Twin Towers and across the river stands the Canton Tower, which is the tallest structure in Guangzhou. Other notable residential areas near Zhujiang New Town include Australian Villa, a gated community built in the mid-1990s and known for attracting expatriate residents.

While the concept of the new town was proposed back in the late 1980s, its development had stagnated for more than a decade. At the end of 1992, the Guangzhou Urban Planning Bureau held an international competition for the planning of Zhujiang New Town. After two rounds of deliberations, Thomas Planning Services Inc. won the competition.Local government tried encourage development by moving some of its offices to the area, including the customs office and taxation bureau. A land lot was specifically reserved and sold to the U.S. Consulate in 2001. Private companies, however, were reluctant to move into the area because of poor transportation links and a lack of other amenities at the time.Eventually in 2003 the government carried out a planning review of the area, when some major adjustments were made including more public facilities and transport infrastructure being incorporated. The area finally met its opportunity of rapid development as the city prepared to host the 2010 Asian Games. The adjacent Haixinsha island was chosen as the venue of the opening ceremony, as a result the area attracted large investment from the government and property developers. Today Zhujiang New Town has the largest concentration of luxurious hotels and office buildings in the city.

== Economy ==
R&F Properties has its head office in Zhujiang New Town.

Hopson Development was previously in Zhujiang New Town.

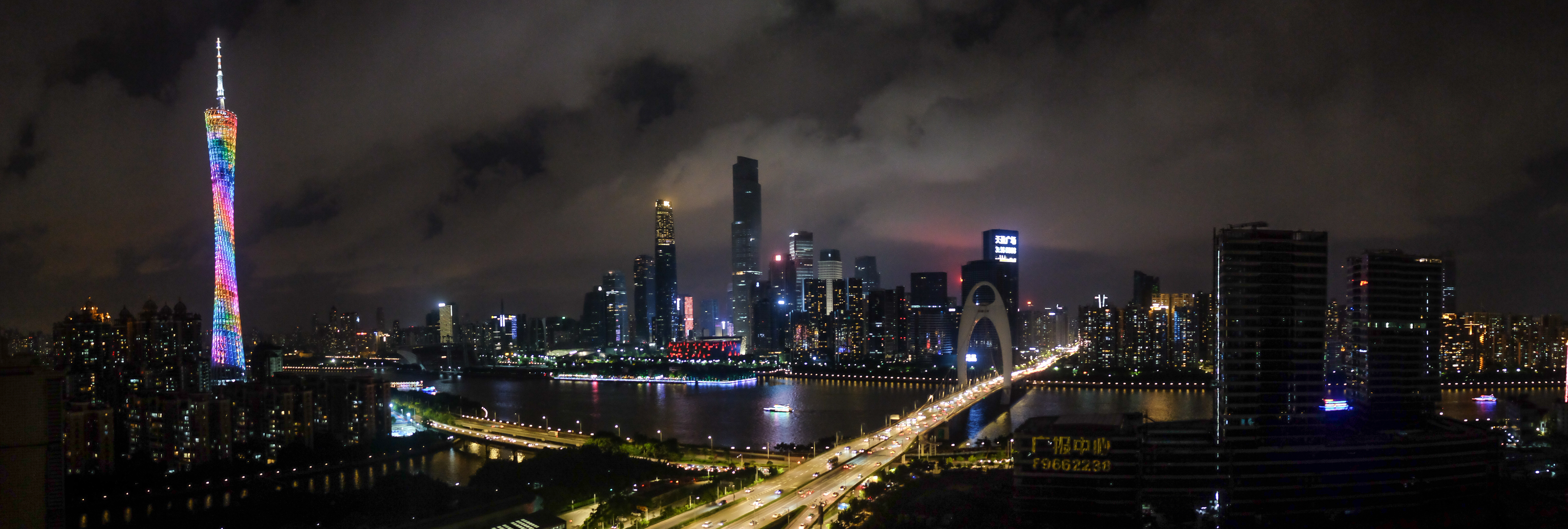
Night view of Zhujiang New Town

== Diplomatic missions ==
The Consulate General of the United States, Guangzhou is in Zhujiang New Town. Many of the 68 consulates in Guangzhou are also set up at the office buildings in the area.

== Guangzhou Metro Stations ==
=== APM line ===
Zhujiang New Town is served by a dedicated people mover system.

=== Lines 3 & 5 ===
Zhujiang New Town is also served by the Zhujiang New Town station on Lines 3 & 5.

== See also ==
- Tianhe District
