= Guangzhou Opera House =

Municipal opera house in Guangdong, China

- 广州大剧院
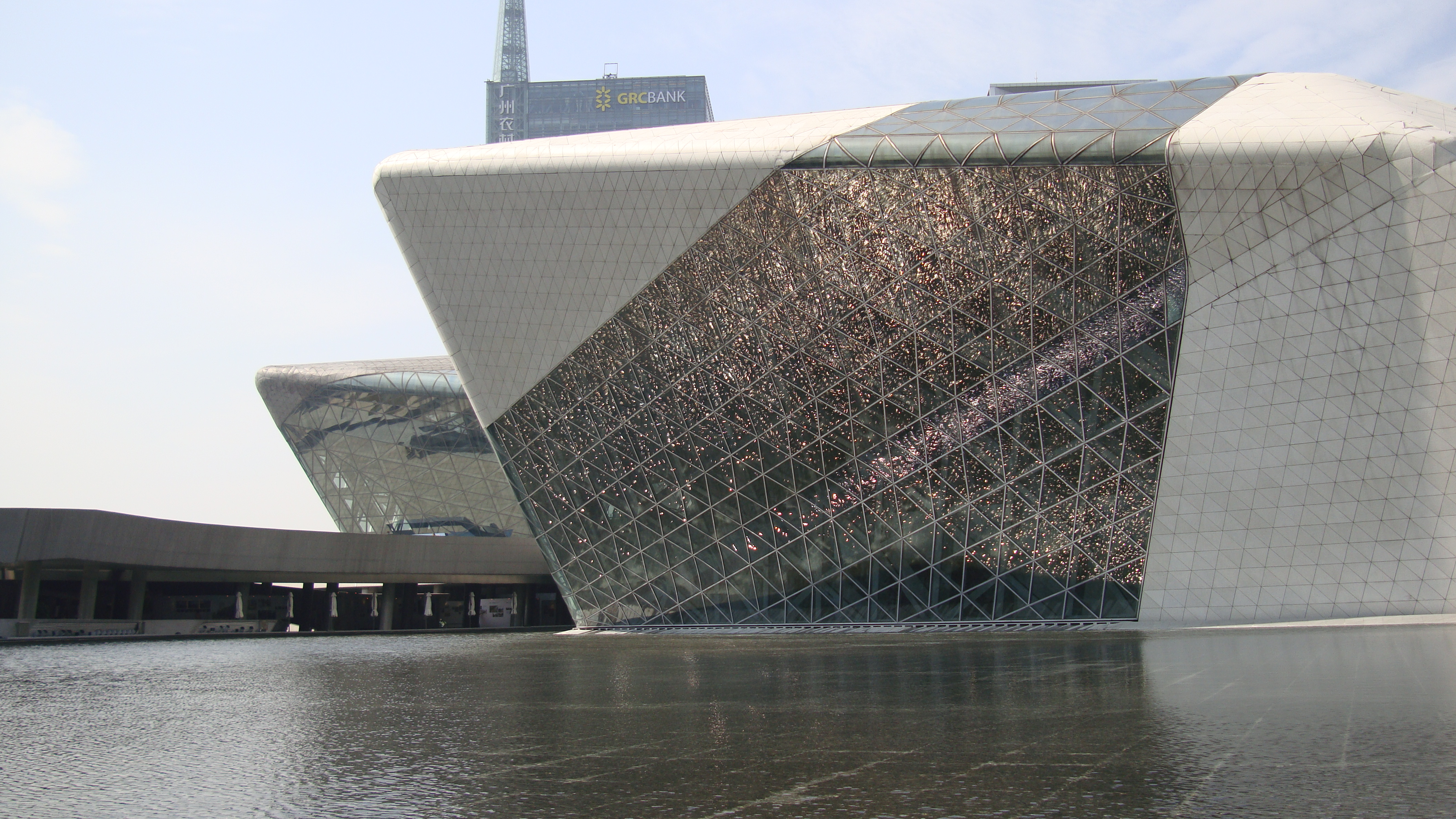

General information
- Status: Completed
- Architectural style: Deconstructivism
- Location: Guangzhou, Guangdong, China
- Groundbreaking: January 2005
- Inaugurated: May 9, 2010
- Cost: 1.38 billion yuan (approx. US$200 million)

Technical details
- Floor area: approx. 71000 m^{2}

Design and construction
- Architect: Zaha Hadid

Other information
- Seating capacity: 1804 (Opera Hall)

Website
- URL

Guangzhou Opera House (广州大剧院) is a public municipal opera house in Guangzhou, Guangdong, China. Designed by Zaha Hadid, it opened on 9 May in 2010.

== History ==
In April 2002 an international architectural competition attracted Coop Himmelb(l)au, Rem Koolhaas and Zaha Hadid – each producing detailed designs. In November 2002, Zaha Hadid's "double pebble" was announced the winner and the groundbreaking ceremony was held early in 2005.

The theatre has become the biggest performing centre in southern China and is one of the three biggest theatres in the nation alongside Beijing's National Centre for the Performing Arts and Shanghai's Shanghai Grand Theatre. May 2010 saw American filmmaker Shahar Stroh direct the premiere production of the opera house: Puccini's opera Turandot which had in previous years been a controversial opera in China.

The project cost 1.38 billion yuan (approx. US$200 million).

== Design ==
The structure was designed by Iraqi architect Zaha Hadid. It is conceived as two rocks washed away by the Pearl River. Its freestanding concrete auditorium set within an exposed granite and glass-clad steel frame took over five years to build, and was praised upon opening by architectural critic Jonathan Glancey in The Guardian, who called it "at once highly theatrical and insistently subtle."

== See also ==
- Guangzhou Opera House Station
