= List of tallest buildings in Guangzhou =

Tall buildings in Guangzhou
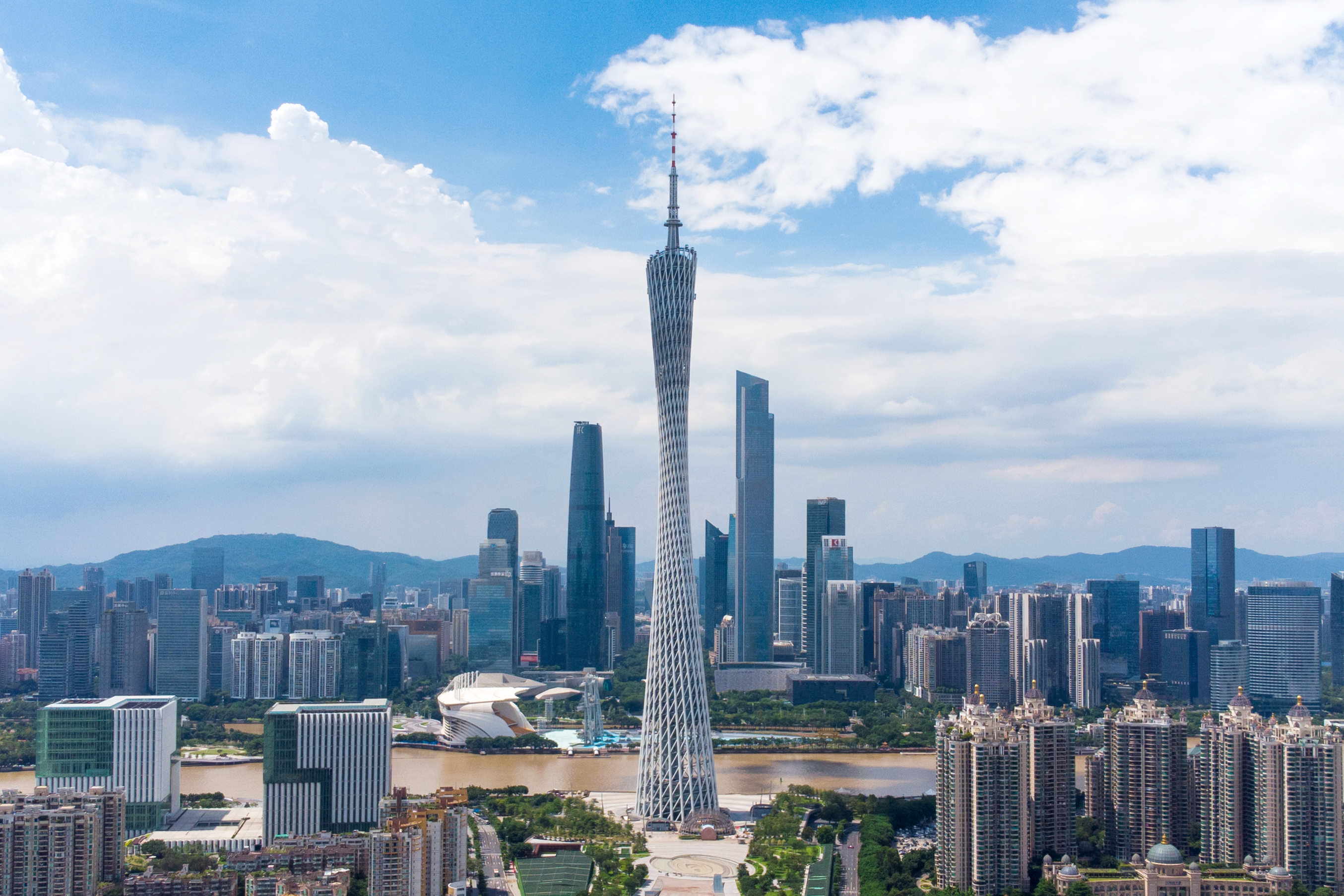
- Skyline of Zhujiang New Town
- Tallest building: Guangzhou CTF Finance Centre (2016)
- Tallest building height: 530 m (1,739 ft)
- Tallest structure: Canton Tower (2010)
- Tallest structure height: 604 m (1,982 ft)
- First 150 m+ building: Guangdong International Building (1990)

Number of tall buildings
- Taller than 150 m (492 ft): 208 (2025) (5th)
- Taller than 200 m (656 ft): 67 (2025) (8th)
- Taller than 300 m (984 ft): 13 (2025) (4th)
- Taller than 400 m (1,312 ft): 2

This list of tallest buildings in Guangzhou ranks skyscrapers in Guangzhou, China by height. Guangzhou is the capital and largest city of Guangdong, China's most populous province, with a population of over 18.6 million. As part of the Pearl River Delta, the most populous urban agglomeration in the world, Guangzhou is one of the cities with the highest number of skyscrapers and high-rises.

Guangzhou's first skyscrapers were built in the 1990s, and the rate of skyscraper construction increased in the 2000s. Since the 2010s, the rate of skyscraper construction has increased significantly. As of 2025, Guangzhou has 204 buildings with a height of above 150 metres, the fifth highest in the world according to the Council of Tall Buildings and Urban Habitat. Despite this, it is bested by neighbouring Shenzhen, which has over 443 buildings above that height. The Pearl River Delta as a whole is one of the regions where skyscrapers are most concentrated. A significant portion of Guangzhou's skyscrapers including the tallest building in the city, Guangzhou CTF Finance Centre, are concentrated in Zhujiang New Town.

Guangzhou CTF Finance Centre, which stands at 530 m (1,740 ft), has been the tallest building in the city since 2016. It is the third-tallest building in China and the eighth-tallest in the world. Though not considered as a building, the Canton Tower is tallest structure in Guangzhou, standing at 600 m (2,000 ft) tall.

Guangzhou currently has 11 supertall skyscrapers, buildings measuring over 300 metres in height, the fourth-highest in the world after Dubai, Shenzhen, and New York City. A further six are under construction, bringing the total number of supertall buildings to 17 when all are complete.

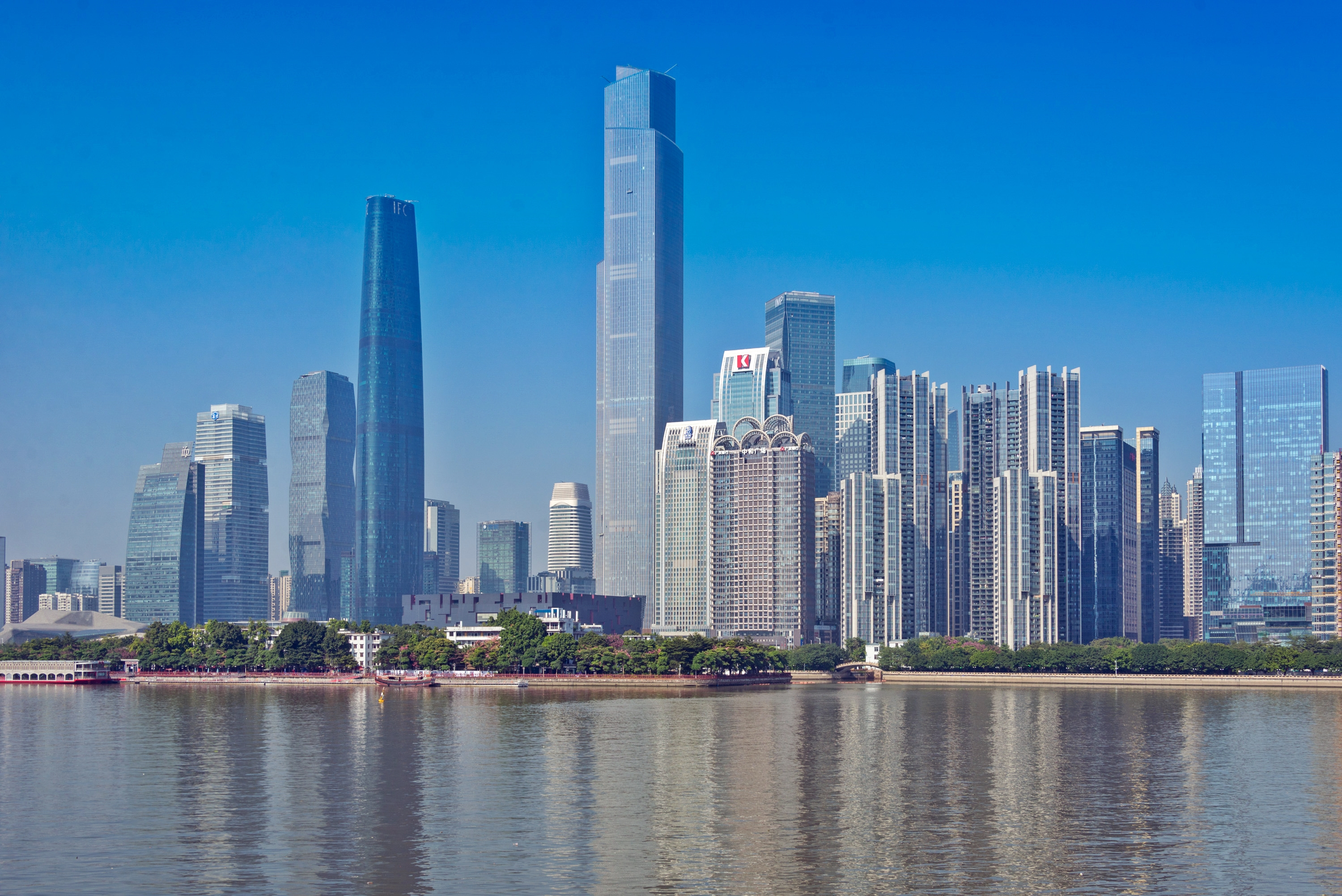
The Zhujiang New Town CBD in Tianhe District with the Guangzhou IFC and Guangzhou CTF Finance Centre

== History ==
The first skyscraper to be constructed in Guangzhou was the Guangdong International Building in 1990, at a height of 200 metres. At the time of its completion, it was the tallest building in China. Since then, Guangzhou has built skyscrapers at a frequent rate. As with many major Chinese cities, the 2010s saw an increased rate of construction in skyscrapers and supertall buildings.

The island of Pazhou has seen increased vertical development in recent years.

== Tallest buildings ==
This list ranks Guangzhou skyscrapers that stand at least 150 m (492 feet) tall, based on standard height measurement. It includes spires and architectural details but does not include antenna masts. Existing structures are included for ranking purposes based on present height. The Chinese name of each building is given in Traditional Chinese.

Was the tallest building in Guangzhou upon completion

| Rank | Name | Image | Height m (ft) | Floors | Year | Notes |
|---|---|---|---|---|---|---|
| — | Canton Tower | | 604 m (1,982 ft) | 37 | 2010 | Tallest structure in Guangzhou, also known as the Guangzhou TV Astronomical & Sight Seeing Tower. Briefly the world's tallest tower until completion of Tokyo Skytree in Tokyo. 2nd-tallest tower and 5th-tallest freestanding structure in the world. |
| 1 | Guangzhou CTF Finance Centre | | 530 m (1,739 ft) | 120 | 2016 | Previously called the Guangzhou East Tower. One half of the Guangzhou Twin Towers. 3rd-tallest building in China and 8th-tallest building in the world. It also houses the world's fastest elevators, which can reach speeds up to 21 m/s (69 ft/s). |
| 2 | Guangzhou International Finance Center | | 438.6 m (1,439 ft) | 102 | 2010 | Previously called the Guangzhou West Tower. One half of the Guangzhou Twin Towers. 14th-tallest building in China and 27th-tallest building in the world. Briefly the world's tallest building with a roof-top helipad until completion of Citic Tower in Beijing. |
| 3 | CITIC Plaza | | 390.2 m (1,280 ft) | 80 | 1996 | Briefly the tallest building in China until completion of Jin Mao Tower in Shanghai. 21st-tallest building in China. Briefly the world's tallest concrete building until completion of Trump International Hotel in Chicago. |
| 4 | Guangdong Business Center | | 375.5 m (1,232 ft) | 60 | 2025 | |
| 5 | The Pinnacle | | 350.3 m (1,149 ft) | 60 | 2011 | Colloquially known as the Pencil Building, also known as the Guangsheng International Building. It has become the tallest stone curtain wall building in China. |
| 6 | Knowledge Tower | | 330 m (1,083 ft) | 55 | 2025 | First steel-frame-core-tube structure skyscraper in Guangzhou. Topped out in 2023. |
| 7 | Huijin Center 1 | | 320 m (1,050 ft) | 69 | 2022 | Architecturally Topped out in 2021. Completed in 2022. |
| 8 | Junchao Plaza | | 320 m (1,050 ft) | 54 | 2025 | |
| 9 | Guangzhou International Cultural Center | | 320 m (1,050 ft) | 67 | 2025 | |
| 10 | Global City Square | | 318.9 m (1,046 ft) | 67 | 2016 | Formerly known as the International Metropolitan Plaza. It was selected as a Grade A commercial office building in August 2021. |
| 11 | Poly Pazhou C2 | | 311 m (1,020 ft) | 65 | 2017 | The first supertall building to be constructed outside the Tianhe District. Tallest building in Haizhu District. |
| 12 = | Pearl River Tower | | 309.4 m (1,015 ft) | 71 | 2013 | |
| 12 = | Fortune Center | | 309.4 m (1,015 ft) | 68 | 2015 | |
| 14 | Guangfa Securities Headquarters | | 308 m (1,010 ft) | 58 | 2018 | |
| 15 | Leatop Plaza | | 302.7 m (993 ft) | 64 | 2012 | |
| 16 | R&F Yingkai Square | | 296.2 m (972 ft) | 66 | 2014 | |
| 17 | Yuehai Finance Center Tower 1 | | 283.9 m (931 ft) | 59 | 2022 | |
| 18 | GT Land Landmark Plaza South Tower | | 282.8 m (928 ft) | 47 | 2016 | |
| 19 | Star River Center | | 280 m (919 ft) | 46 | 2022 | Architecturally Topped out in 2020. Estimated Completion in 2022. |
| 20 | Tianhui Plaza C3 | | 270 m (886 ft) | 60 | 2017 | |
| 21 | China International Center Tower B | | 269.5 m (884 ft) | 62 | 2007 | |
| 22 | Dapeng International Plaza | | 269.4 m (884 ft) | 56 | 2007 | |
| 23 | Bank of Guangzhou Tower | | 267.8 m (879 ft) | 57 | 2012 | |
| 24 | Grand City Main Tower | | 266 m (873 ft) | 57 | 2021 | |
| 25 | Post & Telecommunication Hub | | 260 m (853 ft) | 68 | 2002 | Also known as Guangdong Telecom Plaza. |
| 26 | Cadre City Plaza West Tower | | 257 m (843 ft) | 60 | 2020 | |
| 27 | R&F International Business Center Phase 2 | | 252.6 m (829 ft) | 53 | 2016 | |
| 28 = | Bravo Park Place | | 250 m (820 ft) | 55 | 2016 | |
| 28 = | South China International Wharf Service Center | | 250 m (820 ft) | 55 | 2018 | |
| 30 | New World Times Center Phase 2 | | 249 m (817 ft) | 57 | 2010 | |
| 31 | R&F Centre | | 243 m (797 ft) | 54 | 2007 | |
| 32 | Pearl River One Office Tower | | 241 m (791 ft) | 50 | 2022 | |
| 33 | Country Garden Center Tower 1 | | 240 m (787 ft) | 54 | 2021 | |
| 34 | Guangzhou Fuli Dongshan Xintiandi | | 233 m (764 ft) | 52 | 2017 | |
| 35 | Fosun Southern Headquarters North Tower | | 230 m (755 ft) | 48 | 2022 | |
| 36 | Kingold Century | | 228 m (748 ft) | 47 | 2016 | |
| 37 | Wan Bo Teem Mall 1 | | 227.7 m (747 ft) | 40 | 2018 | |
| 38 | Victory Plaza Tower A | | 223 m (732 ft) | 54 | 2007 | |
| 39 = | Aoyuan International Center | | 220 m (722 ft) | 50 | 2018 | |
| 39 = | Huijin Center 2 | | 220 m (722 ft) | 50 | 2022 | |
| 39 = | Panyu Agile Plaza Tower A | | 220 m (722 ft) | 47 | 2021 | |
| 42 | Guangzhou International Commercial Center | | 219.5 m (720 ft) | 51 | 2021 | |
| 43 | Onelink Center | | 218 m (715 ft) | 53 | 2010 | |
| — | Guangzhou TV Tower | | 218 m (715 ft) | 3 | 1991 | |
| 44 = | Tianhebei Tower | | 212 m (696 ft) | 55 | 2015 | |
| 44 = | Taikoo Hui Tower 1 | | 212 m (696 ft) | 40 | 2011 | |
| 46 = | Somerset Bio-Island Guangzhou | | 210 m (689 ft) | 48 | 2020 | |
| 47 = | Vertical City | | 208 m (682 ft) | 51 | 2010 | |
| 47 = | CCCC South Headquarters | | 208 m (682 ft) | 50 | 2015 | |
| 49 = | Wechat Headquarters | | 207 m (679 ft) | 38 | 2023 | Architecturally Topped out in 2021. Estimated Completion in 2023. |
| 49 = | Alibaba South Headquarters | | 207 m (679 ft) | 37 | 2020 | |
| 51 | GT Land Landmark Plaza North Tower | | 206.8 m (678 ft) | 46 | 2014 | |
| 52 | Center Plaza | | 202.1 m (663 ft) | 47 | 2004 | |
| 53 = | Cadre City Plaza East Tower | | 202 m (663 ft) | 43 | 2020 | |
| 53 = | Guangzhou Aluminum Group Pazhou Headquarters East Tower | | 202 m (663 ft) | 41 | 2022 | |
| 53 = | Guangzhou Aluminum Group Pazhou Headquarters West Tower | | 202 m (663 ft) | 41 | 2022 | |
| 56 | Nanfang International Mansion | | 201 m (659 ft) | 48 | 1998 | Also known as the Royal Mediterranean Hotel. |
| 57 | New World Canton Center C2 Tower | | 200.8 m (659 ft) | 47 | 2022 | Architecturally Topped out in 2021. Estimated Completion in 2022. |
| 58 | Guangdong International Building | | 200.3 m (657 ft) | 63 | 1990 | Also known as Guangdong International Hotel and locally known as the 63 Floors. |
| 59 | Deshun Building | | 200 m (656 ft) | 41 | 2018 | |
| 60 | Guangzhou Greenland Baiyun Center | | 199.9 m (656 ft) | 45 | 2014 | |
| 61 = | Park Hyatt Shangdong The Landmark | | 198.8 m (652 ft) | 52 | 2017 | |
| 61 = | Metro Plaza 1 | | 198.8 m (652 ft) | 48 | 1996 | |
| 61 = | Canton Fair Westin Hotel | | 198.8 m (652 ft) | 43 | 2011 | |
| 64 | International Finance Place | | 198 m (650 ft) | 39 | 2007 | |
| 65 | Poly Pazhou C1 | | 197.5 m (648 ft) | 40 | 2017 | |
| 66 | R&F Yingtong Tower | | 196 m (643 ft) | 41 | 2013 | |
| 67 | Teem Tower | | 195 m (640 ft) | 45 | 2006 | Also known as Teemtower Office Building. |
| 68 | GZ Electric Power Building | | 194 m (636 ft) | 35 | 2002 | |
| 69 = | Caesar's Palace 3 | | 192 m (630 ft) | 52 | 2004 | Also known as Victory Garden Block C. |
| 69 = | Aiqun Huijing Wan Tower A | | 192 m (630 ft) | 49 | 2013 | |
| 69 = | Aiqun Huijing Wan Tower B | | 192 m (630 ft) | 49 | 2013 | |
| 72 | Fortune Way | | 191.5 m (628 ft) | 53 | 2015 | |
| 73 = | Bercy Plaza I | | 190.8 m (626 ft) | 51 | 2007 | |
| 73 = | Bercy Plaza II | | 190.8 m (626 ft) | 51 | 2007 | |
| 75 | Agile Center | | 189.7 m (622 ft) | 39 | 2014 | |
| 76 | Jiayu Building | | 189.5 m (622 ft) | 47 | 2015 | |
| 77 | Evergrande Center | | 189.2 m (621 ft) | 43 | 2011 | |
| 78 | Guangzhou Marriott Hotel Tianhe | | 188.8 m (619 ft) | 48 | 2004 | |
| 79 = | Shui On Guangzhou Centre | | 188 m (617 ft) | 46 | 2008 | also known as The Centerpointe |
| 79 = | Guangzhou Sinopec Building | | 188 m (617 ft) | 51 | 2008 | |
| 81 | China Shine Plaza | | 187 m (614 ft) | 45 | 2006 | |
| 82 = | Poly World Trade Center Block D | | 184 / 603 | 47 | 2012 | |
| 82 = | Poly World Trade Center Block F | | 184 / 603 | 47 | 2012 | |
| 84 | R&F Ritz-Carlton Hotel | | 181.5 m (595 ft) | 39 | 2007 | |
| 85 = | Asian International Hotel | | 180 m (591 ft) | 51 | 2001 | |
| 85 = | Yuecai Building | | 180 m (591 ft) | 40 | 2008 | |
| 85 = | Pol Tower V | | 180 m (591 ft) | 40 | 2011 | |
| 85 = | Yuexiu City Plaza | | 180 m (591 ft) | 39 | 2006 | |
| 85 = | RenFun Business Mansion | | 179.6 m (589 ft) | 42 | 2012 | |
| 90 = | The Riverside, Tower 1 | | 179.4 m (589 ft) | 50 | 2009 | |
| 90 = | The Riverside, Tower 2 | | 179.4 m (589 ft) | 50 | 2009 | |
| 92 = | Hong Kong Macau Center | | 178 m (584 ft) | 51 | 1996 | |
| 92 = | CC Tower | | 178 m (584 ft) | 32 | 2005 | Also known as Xinhe Building. |
| 94 | Canton Fair Command Center | | 176.8 m (580 ft) | 41 | 2009 | |
| 95 | Pearl River International Building | | 175.1 m (574 ft) | 45 | 2007 | |
| 96 | Westin Guangzhou Hotel | | 175 m (574 ft) | 40 | 2007 | |
| 97 | R&F Profit Plaza | | 173.1 m (568 ft) | 42 | 2006 | |
| 98 | Banghua Global Plaza | | 172 m (564 ft) | 37 | 2013 | |
| 99 | Poly Center | | 170.5 m (559 ft) | 36 | 2009 | |
| 100 | Panyu Agile Plaza Tower B | | 170 m (558 ft) | 38 | 2021 | |
| 101 = | Lifeng Center | | 169.7 m (557 ft) | 40 | 2016 | |
| 101 = | Zhukong International Center | | 169.7 m (557 ft) | 38 | 2015 | |
| 103 | W Guangzhou Hotel & Residences | | 169.5 m (556 ft) | 42 | 2013 | |
| 104 | GIE Tower | | 168 m (551 ft) | 35 | 1996 | |
| 105 = | Guangzhou International Trade Center | | 167 m (548 ft) | 48 | 1997 | |
| 105 = | GZITIC Mansion | | 167 m (548 ft) | 47 | 1998 | |
| 105 = | R&F Yingxin Tower | | 167 m (548 ft) | 41 | 2011 | |
| 108 = | China Construction Bank Tower | | 166 / 546 | 47 | 1996 | |
| 108 = | Crowne Plaza Harbourview Guangzhou | | 166 m (545 ft) | 41 | 2008 | |
| 110 | Guangdong GoTone Building | | 165.2 m (542 ft) | 37 | 2008 | |
| 111 | Taikoo Hui Tower 2 | | 165 m (541 ft) | 29 | 2011 | |
| 112 = | Top View 1 | | 163.8 m (537 ft) | 45 | 2006 | |
| 112 = | Top View 2 | | 163.8 m (537 ft) | 45 | 2006 | |
| 112 = | The Riverside 3 | | 163.7 m (537 ft) | 45 | 2006 | |
| 112 = | The Riverside 4 | | 163.7 m (537 ft) | 45 | 2006 | |
| 116 | R&F Yinglong Plaza | | 163 m (535 ft) | 41 | 2005 | also known as Fuli Yinglong Square |
| 117 | New China Mansion | | 162.3 m (532 ft) | 43 | 1999 | |
| 118 | JLB Tower | | 162 m (531 ft) | 39 | 1999 | |
| 119 = | Jade Pavilion 4 | | 161.7 m (531 ft) | 45 | 1998 | |
| 119 = | Jade Pavilion 5 | | 161.7 m (531 ft) | 45 | 1998 | |
| 119 = | Jade Pavilion 6 | | 161.7 m (531 ft) | 45 | 1998 | |
| 119 = | Jade Pavilion 7 | | 161.7 m (531 ft) | 45 | 2002 | |
| 119 = | Jade Pavilion 8 | | 161.7 m (531 ft) | 45 | 2002 | |
| 119 = | Jade Pavilion 9 | | 161.7 m (531 ft) | 45 | 2002 | |
| 125 | Victory Plaza Tower B | | 161.1 m (529 ft) | 36 | 2007 | |
| 126 = | Poly International Plaza Tower 1 | | 160.6 m (527 ft) | 34 | 2007 | |
| 126 = | Poly International Plaza Tower 2 | | 160.6 m (527 ft) | 34 | 2007 | |
| 128 | Yudean Plaza Block A | | 160 m (525 ft) | 32 | 2014 | |
| 129 | Victory Garden Block B | | 159.9 m (525 ft) | 48 | 2004 | |
| 130 = | Post Chateau Block A | | 159 m (522 ft) | 43 | 2005 | |
| 130 = | Post Chateau Block B | | 159 m (522 ft) | 43 | 2005 | |
| 132 | China Southern Airlines Tower | | 158.9 m (521 ft) | 36 | 2018 | |
| 133 = | King Peak Garden C | | 156 / 513 | 40 | 2008 | |
| 133 = | King Peak Garden B | | 156 / 513 | 40 | 2008 | |
| 133 = | Qiao Xin Hui Yue Tai Tower 1 | | 156 / 513 | 40 | | |
| 133 = | Qiao Xin Hui Yue Tai Tower 2 | | 156 / 513 | 40 | | |
| 133 = | Qiao Xin Hui Yue Tai Tower 3 | | 156 / 513 | 40 | | |
| 133 = | Qiao Xin Hui Yue Tai Tower 4 | | 156 / 513 | 40 | | |
| 133 = | Qiao Xin Hui Yue Tai Tower 5 | | 156 / 513 | 40 | | |
| 140 | GDTV Center Phase 1 | | 154 m (505 ft) | 33 | 1991 | |
| 141 = | Le Palais | | 153 m (502 ft) | 52 | 2000 | |
| 141 = | Coral Garden 1 | | 153 / 502 | 52 | 2001 | |
| 141 = | Coral Garden 2 | | 153 / 502 | 52 | 2001 | |
| 141 = | Coral Garden 3 | | 153 / 502 | 52 | 2001 | |
| 141 = | Coral Garden 4 | | 153 / 502 | 52 | 2001 | |
| 141 = | Dongzhao Building | | 153 m (502 ft) | 42 | 2008 | |
| 147 | Renfeng Tower | | 152.5 m (500 ft) | 41 | 2004 | |
| 148 | Riverside Hotel Central Tower | | 152 m (499 ft) | 45 | 1996 | |
| 149 = | The Regal Harbour 1 | | 151.3 m (496 ft) | 43 | 2005 | |
| 149 = | The Regal Harbour 2 | | 151.3 m (496 ft) | 43 | 2005 | |
| 149 = | The Regal Harbour 3 | | 151.3 m (496 ft) | 43 | 2005 | |
| 152 | Shun Tak Business Centre | | 150.6 m (494 ft) | 38 | 2000 | |
| 153 = | The Cosmos 1 | | 150.4 m (493 ft) | 45 | 2006 | |
| 153 = | The Cosmos 2 | | 150.4 m (493 ft) | 45 | 2006 | |
| 155 = | King Peak Garden Block D | | 150 m (492 ft) | 48 | 2008 | |
| 155 = | King Peak Garden Block E | | 150 m (492 ft) | 48 | 2008 | |
| 155 = | Guangdong Development Bank Center | | 150 m (492 ft) | 41 | 1996 | |
| 155 = | Guangzhou Development Center Building | | 150 m (492 ft) | 37 | 2004 | |
| 155 = | Shangri-La Hotel | | 150 m (492 ft) | 36 | 2007 | |
| 155 = | Panyu Agile Plaza Tower C | | 150 m (492 ft) | 31 | 2021 | |

== Tallest under construction or proposed ==
=== Under construction ===
This lists buildings that are under construction in Guangzhou and are planned to rise at least 150 m (492 feet). Buildings that have already been topped out are also included.

| Name | Height* m / feet | Floors | Year* | Notes |
|---|---|---|---|---|
| Guangdong Business Center | 375.5 / 1,232 | 60 | 2024 | |
| Baolixian Village Old Reform Project Main | 350 / 1,148 | 70 | 2026 | |
| Poly 335 Financial Center Tower 1 | 335.2 / 1,100 | 64 | 2024 | |
| Guangjian Financial Center | 333 / 1,093 | 0 | 2027 | |
| Jiulong Lake Knowledge Tower | 330 / 1,083 | 53 | 2025 | |
| Junchao Plaza | 320 / 1,050 | 67 | 2024 | |
| Guangzhou International Cultural Center | 320 / 1,050 | 54 | 2024 | |
| China Fortune Land Center | 300 / 984 | 0 | | |
| MINISO Headquarters | 288 / 943 | 0 | 2023 | |
| Wechat HQ | 207 / 679 | 39 | 2023 | |
| Shangdong Hanyu Yayuan Apartments | 198 / 650 | 52 | 2017 | Estimated Completion in 2017. |
| Matsunichi Tower | 195 / 640 | 45 | | |
| Poly Pazhou C1 | 198 / 648 | 40 | 2017 | Estimated Completion in 2017. |
| Zhongshui Plaza | 173 / 568 | 46 | On hold | |
| Tianhui Plaza C1 | 188 / 617 | 55 | 2017 | Estimated Completion in 2017. |
| The Riviera A6 | 181 / 595 | 53 | 2014 | Estimated Completion in 2014. |
| The Riviera A2 | 178 / 584 | 52 | 2014 | Estimated Completion in 2014. |
| The Riviera A3 | 178 / 584 | 52 | 2014 | Estimated Completion in 2014. |
| The Riviera A4-A5 | 178 / 584 | 52 | 2014 | Estimated Completion in 2014. |

* Table entries without text indicate that information regarding building heights, floor counts, and/or dates of completion has not yet been released.

=== Approved ===
This lists buildings that are approved or undergoing site preparation for construction in Guangzhou and are planned to rise at least 150 m (492 feet).

| Name | Height* m / feet | Floors | Year* | Notes |
|---|---|---|---|---|
| International Innovation Center | 488 / 1601 | 104 | | |
| The Trump International Hotel and Tower | 390 / 1279 | 75 | | N/A |
| Liede West Area Redevelopment | 270 / 886 | 60 | | |

== Timeline of tallest buildings ==
The following is a list of buildings that in the past held, or currently holds the title of the tallest building in Guangzhou. This list excludes such historic pagodas like the Flower Pagoda or Zhenhai Tower.

| Name | Picture | Floors | Height m | Year | Reference(s) |
|---|---|---|---|---|---|
| Nanfang Building | | 12 | | 1922 | |
| Aiqun Hotel | | 15 | 64 | 1937 | |
| Guangzhou Hotel | | 27 | | 1968 | |
| Baiyun Hotel | | 34 | 117 | 1976 | |
| Guangdong International Building | | 63 | 200 | 1990 | |
| CITIC Plaza | | 80 | 391 | 1996 | |
| Guangzhou International Finance Center | | 103 | 439 | 2010 | |
| Canton Tower | | 37 | 462 (595 if measured to tip) | 2010 | |
| Guangzhou CTF Finance Centre | | 111 | 530 | 2016 | |

== See also ==
- List of tallest buildings in China
