= Knowledge Tower =

Supertall skyscraper in Guangzhou, Guangdong, China

- 知识塔
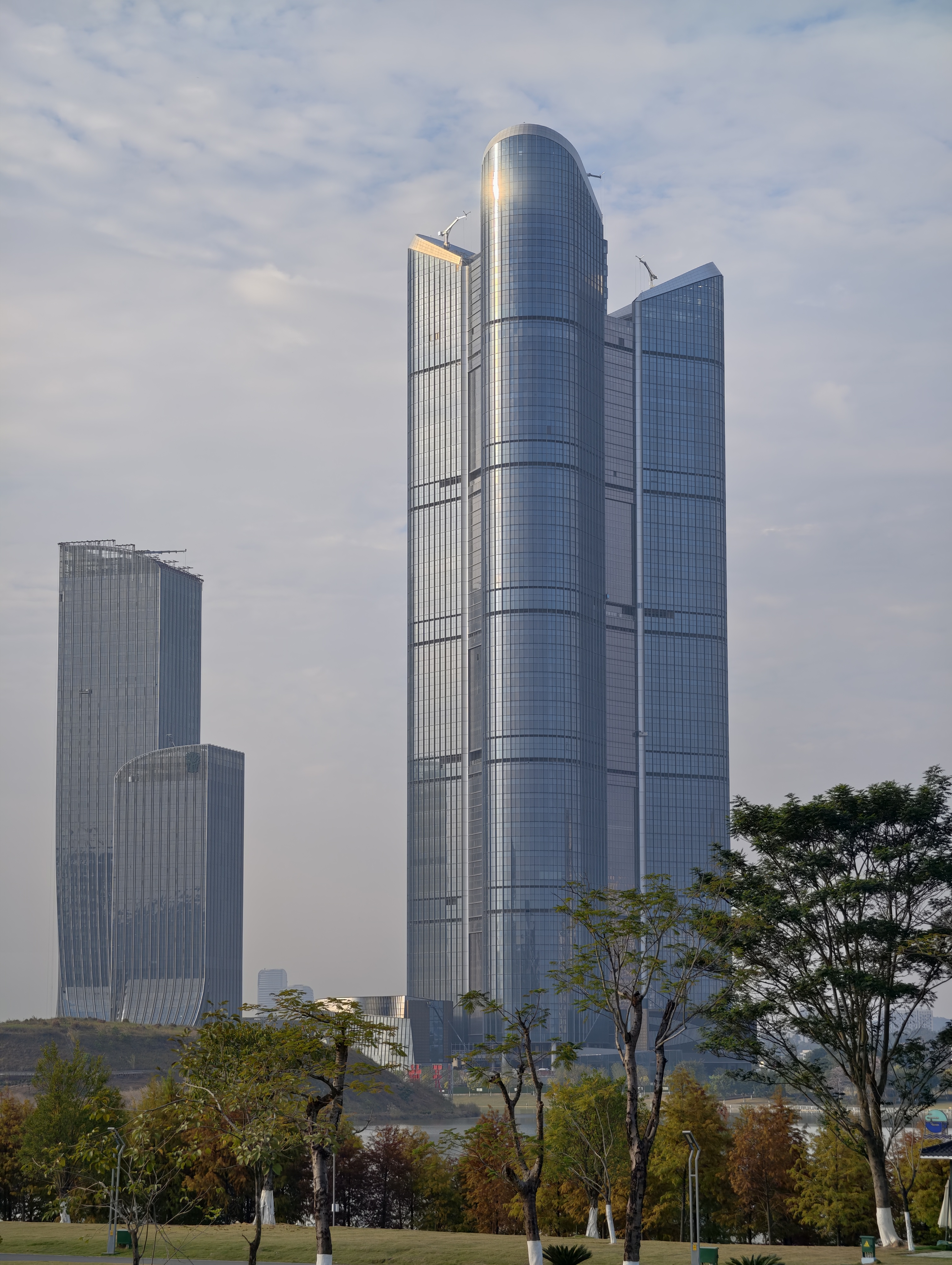
- Knowledge Tower in Guangzhou DEC 2025

General information
- Status: Completed
- Type: Mixed-use: Hotel/ Office
- Location: 8GWG+67M, Huangpu District, Guangzhou, China
- Coordinates: 23.34558°N 113.52566°E
- Construction started: 2021
- Completed: December 2025
- Opening: May 2026
- Owner: Sino-Singapore Guangzhou Knowledge City Group

Height
- Roof: 330 m (1,080 ft)

Technical details
- Structural system: Reinforced concrete
- Floor count: 55

Design and construction
- Architect: DP Architects
- Developer: Guangzhou Qichuan Fangta Property Development
- Main contractor: China State Construction Engineering

The Knowledge Tower (Chinese: 知识塔) (also known as the Jiulong Lake Knowledge Tower) is a mixed-use skyscraper under construction in Guangzhou, China. Started in 2021, the building is scheduled for completion in 2025. It was topped out and stands at 330 m (1,080 ft) tall with 55 floors.

== History ==
In June 2020, the demolition work of the Jiufengxu district, the previous development on the current position of the Knowledge Tower, the construction site was officially groundbroken. On July 22, 2020, the foundation pit support and earthwork project of the Knowledge Tower started. On May 20, 2021, China Construction Eighth Engineering Bureau won the bid for the general contracting of the Knowledge Tower project, with a bid amount of RMB 2.457 billion.

On June 11, 2021, the groundbreaking ceremony for the main project of Knowledge Tower was held. On June 29, 2021, the Knowledge Tower officially started construction. On October 22, 2021, the pouring of the foundation slab of the Knowledge Tower was successfully completed. On October 24, 2021, the first steel structure of Knowledge Tower was hoisted. On January 10, 2022, the first slab of the Knowledge Tower basement roof was poured. On March 16, 2022, the last roof slab of the Knowledge Tower basement was poured.

On August 6, 2022, the last top slab of the Knowledge Tower basement structure was poured. On August 20, 2023, the main structure of the core tube of the East Tower of Knowledge Tower was capped. On November 8, 2023, the main structure of the Knowledge Tower was completed. On January 31, 2024, the steel structure project of Knowledge Tower was successfully completed and capped. On August 16, 2024, the crown panel of the East Tower of Knowledge Tower was installed. On December 26, 2024, the Knowledge Tower curtain wall project was completed. The Knowledge Tower will be officially completed in the first half of 2025.

== Transportation ==
The building is connected to the rest of the city by the Guangzhou Metro Line 14, having the Knowledge City Station nearby it (with an underground passage connecting Knowledge Tower and Knowledge City Metro Station).

== See also ==
- List of tallest buildings in China
- List of tallest buildings in Guangzhou
