= Metro Plaza =

Skyscraper in Guangzhou, Guangdong, China

- 大都会广场
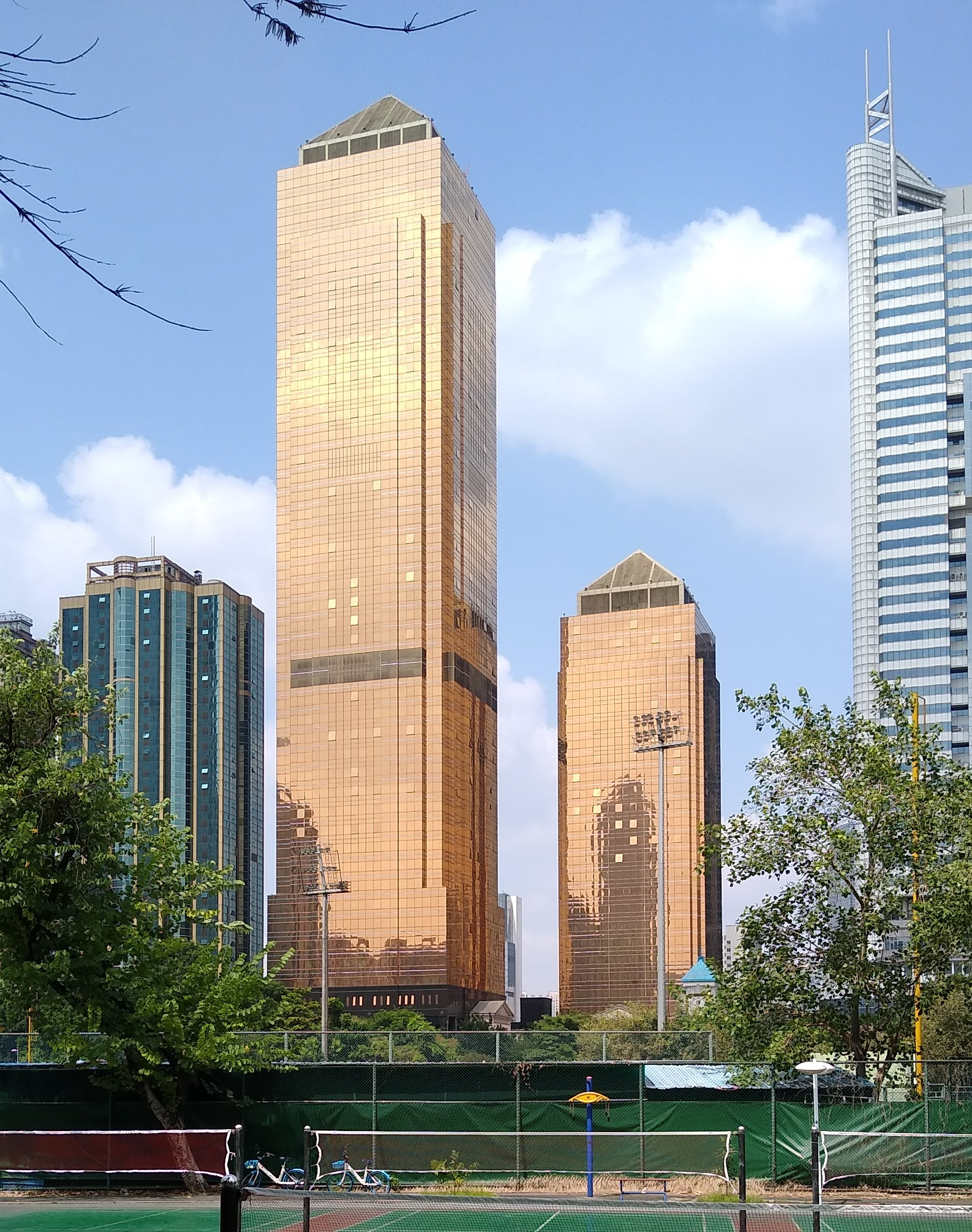
- Interactive map of the Metro Plaza area

General information
- Status: Completed
- Type: Hotel; Commercial offices
- Architectural style: Modernism
- Location: 183 Tianhe Road North, Guangzhou, Guangdong, China
- Coordinates: 23°8′40″N 113°19′2″E
- Construction started: 1994
- Completed: 1996

Height
- Roof: Metro Plaza I: 198.8 m (652 ft); China Mayors Tower: 116 m (381 ft)

Technical details
- Floor count: Metro Plaza I: 48; China Mayors Tower: 28
- Floor area: Metro Plaza I: 77,000 m^{2} (830,000 sq ft); China Mayors Tower: 24,000 m^{2} (260,000 sq ft)

Design and construction
- Architect: Architecture Design Institute of South China University of Technology
- Developer: Far East Aluminium Works Co., Ltd.

The Metro Plaza (simplified Chinese: 大都会广场; traditional Chinese: 大都會廣場) is a two complex of towers in Guangzhou, China. Metro Plaza I is 198.8 m (652 ft) with 52 storeys, and China Mayors Tower is 116 m (381 ft) with 28 storeys. Construction of the complex was completed in 1996.

== Gallery ==
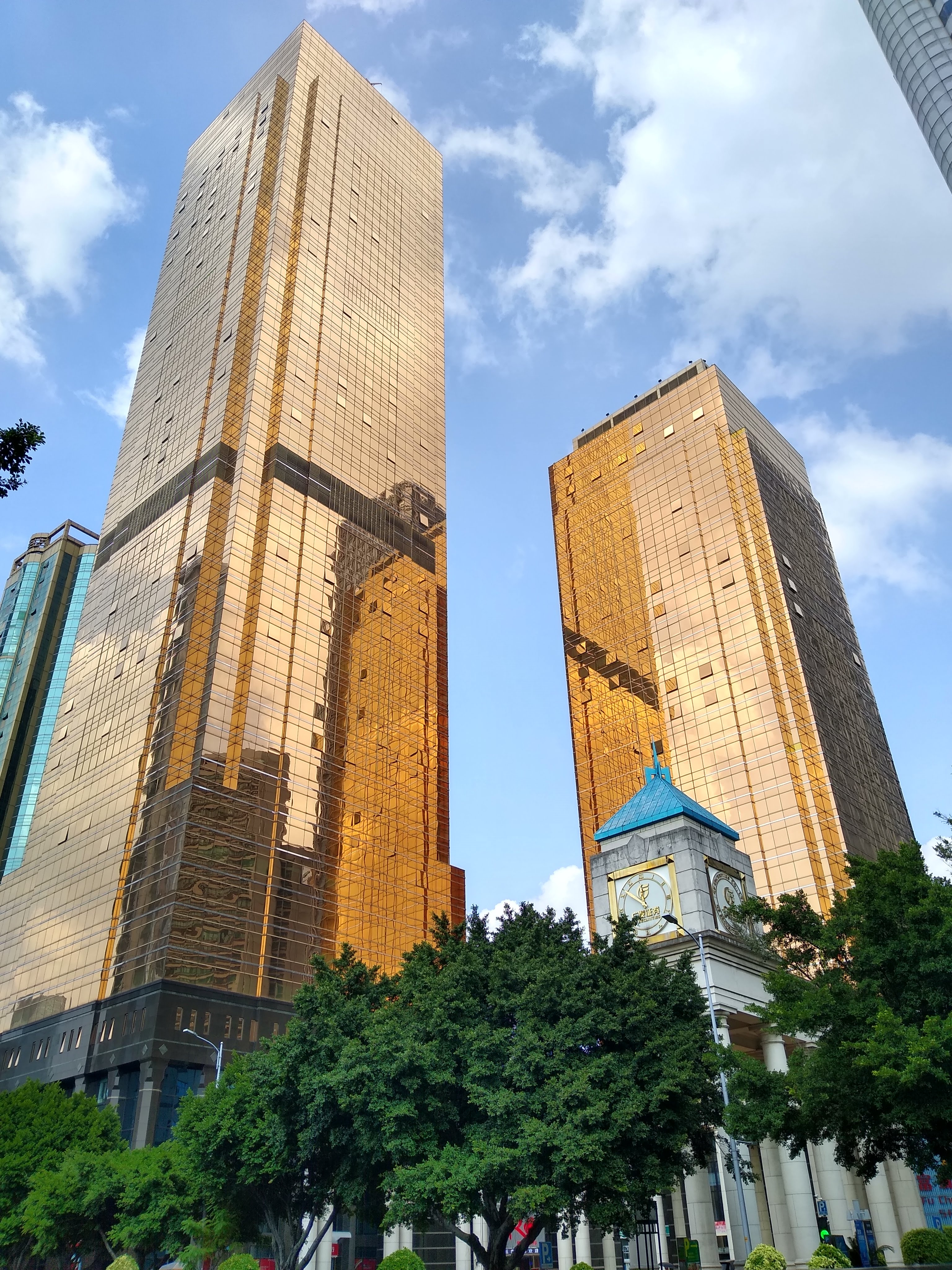

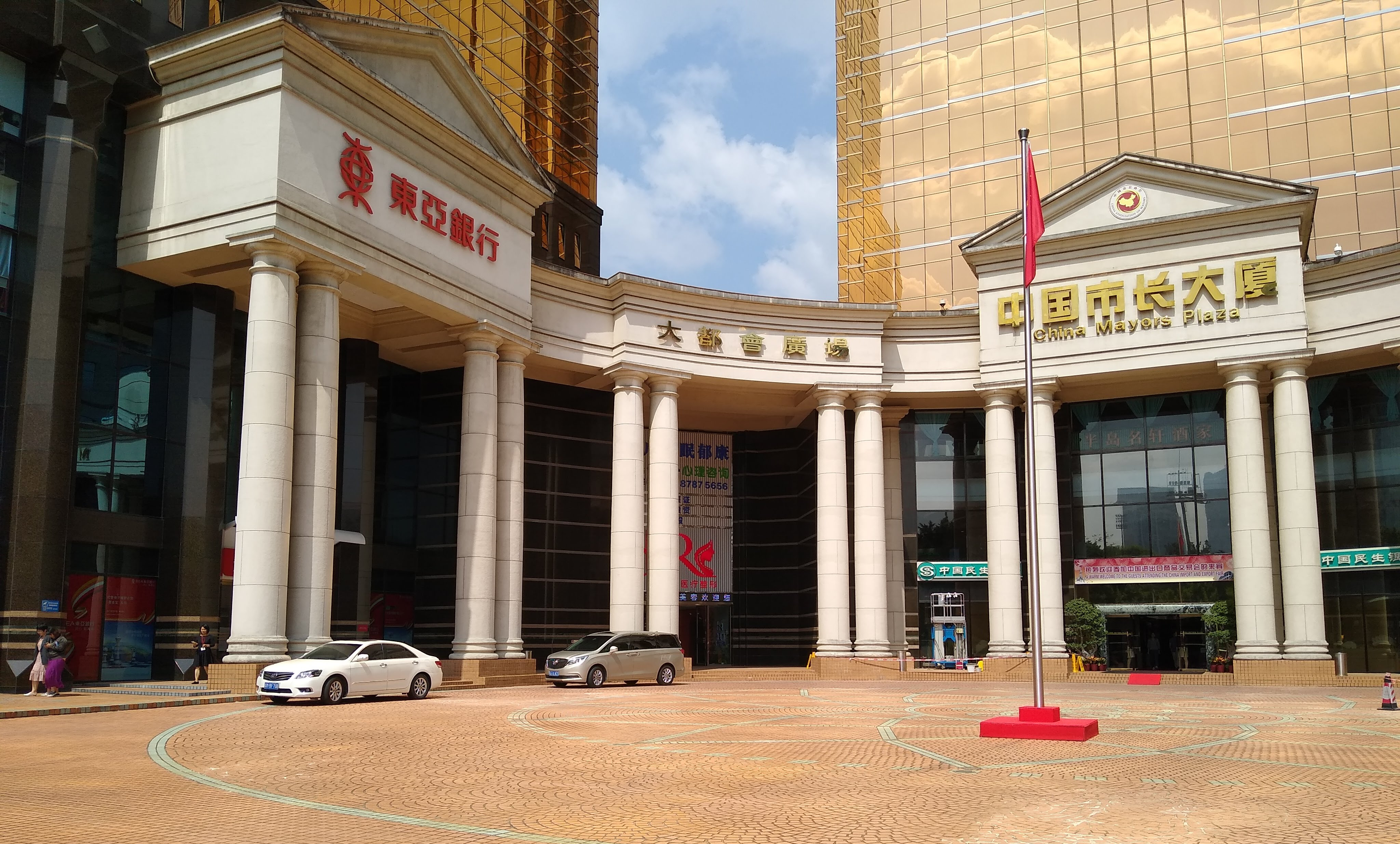

== See also ==
- List of tallest buildings in Guangzhou
