= Teem Plaza =

Skyscraper in Guangzhou, Guangdong, China

Teem Tower
- 天河城广场
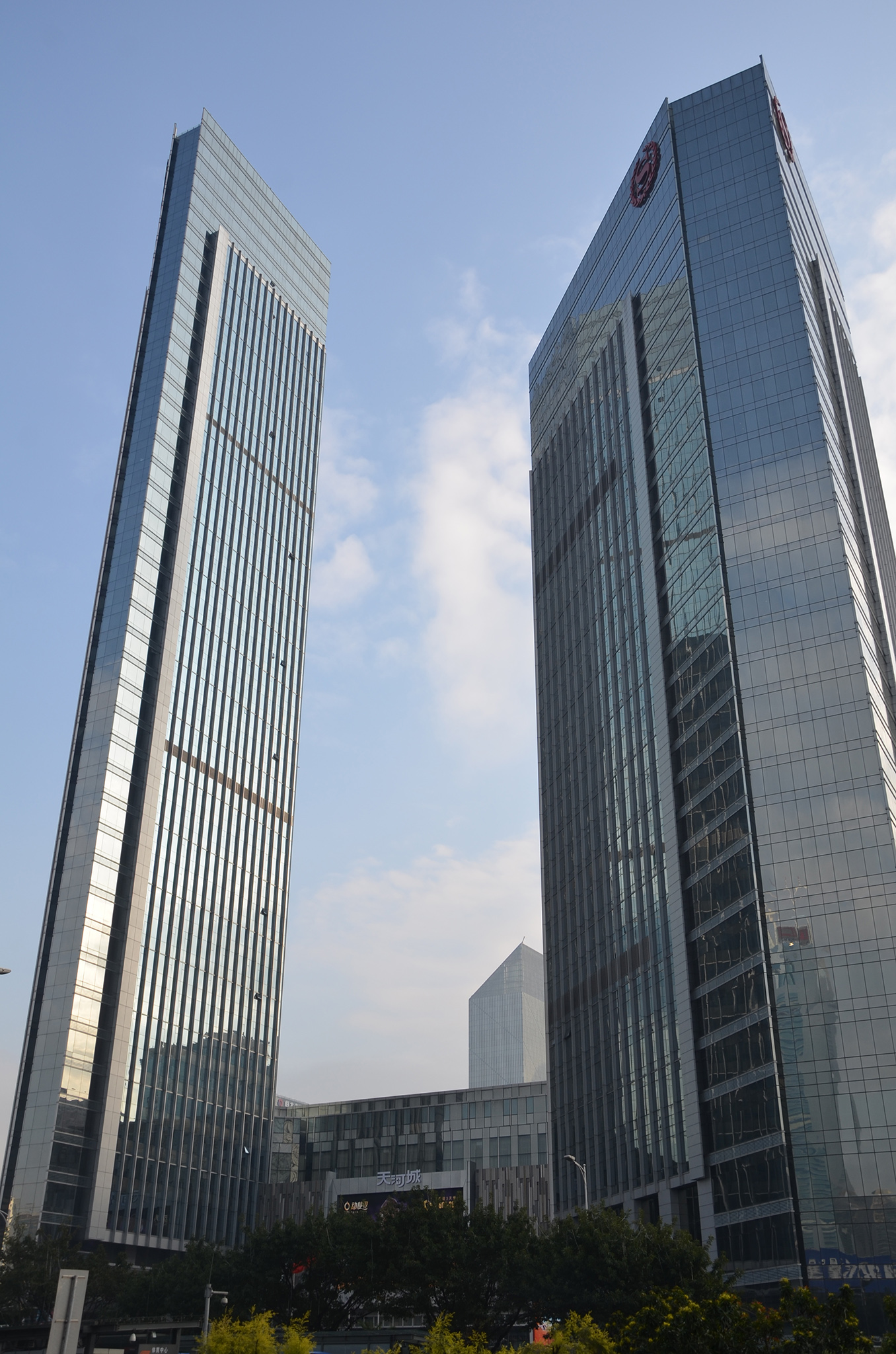
- Interactive map of the Teem Tower area
- Former names: Teem Plaza East Tower

General information
- Status: Completed
- Type: Commercial offices
- Architectural style: Modernism
- Location: 208 Tianhe Road, Guangzhou, China
- Coordinates: 23°08′05″N 113°19′03″E
- Construction started: Teem Tower: 2004; Guangzhou Sheraton: 2006
- Completed: Teem Tower: 2006; Guangzhou Sheraton: 2011

Height
- Roof: 195 m (640 ft)

Technical details
- Floor count: Teem Tower: 45; Guangzhou Sheraton: 38
- Floor area: Teem Tower: 103,000 m^{2} (1,110,000 sq ft); Guangzhou Sheraton: 65,000 m^{2} (700,000 sq ft)
- Lifts/elevators: Teem Tower: 22

Design and construction
- Architects: P & T Group

Other information
- Number of rooms: 445

The Teem Plaza (Chinese: 天河城广场) is a twin tower complex in Tianhe District, Guangzhou, China that consists of 45-storey, 195 m (640 ft) Teem Tower, a 38-storey Sheraton Hotels and Resorts-branded hotels, and a shopping mall. Construction of Teem Plaza was completed in 2008.

== Tenants ==
- Google Guangzhou: Unit 3007, Teemtower (天河城大厦)

== See also ==
- List of tallest buildings in Guangzhou
