= Guangzhou Hotel =

Hotel in Guangzhou, Guangdong, China

Coordinates: 23.1188°N 113.2605°E

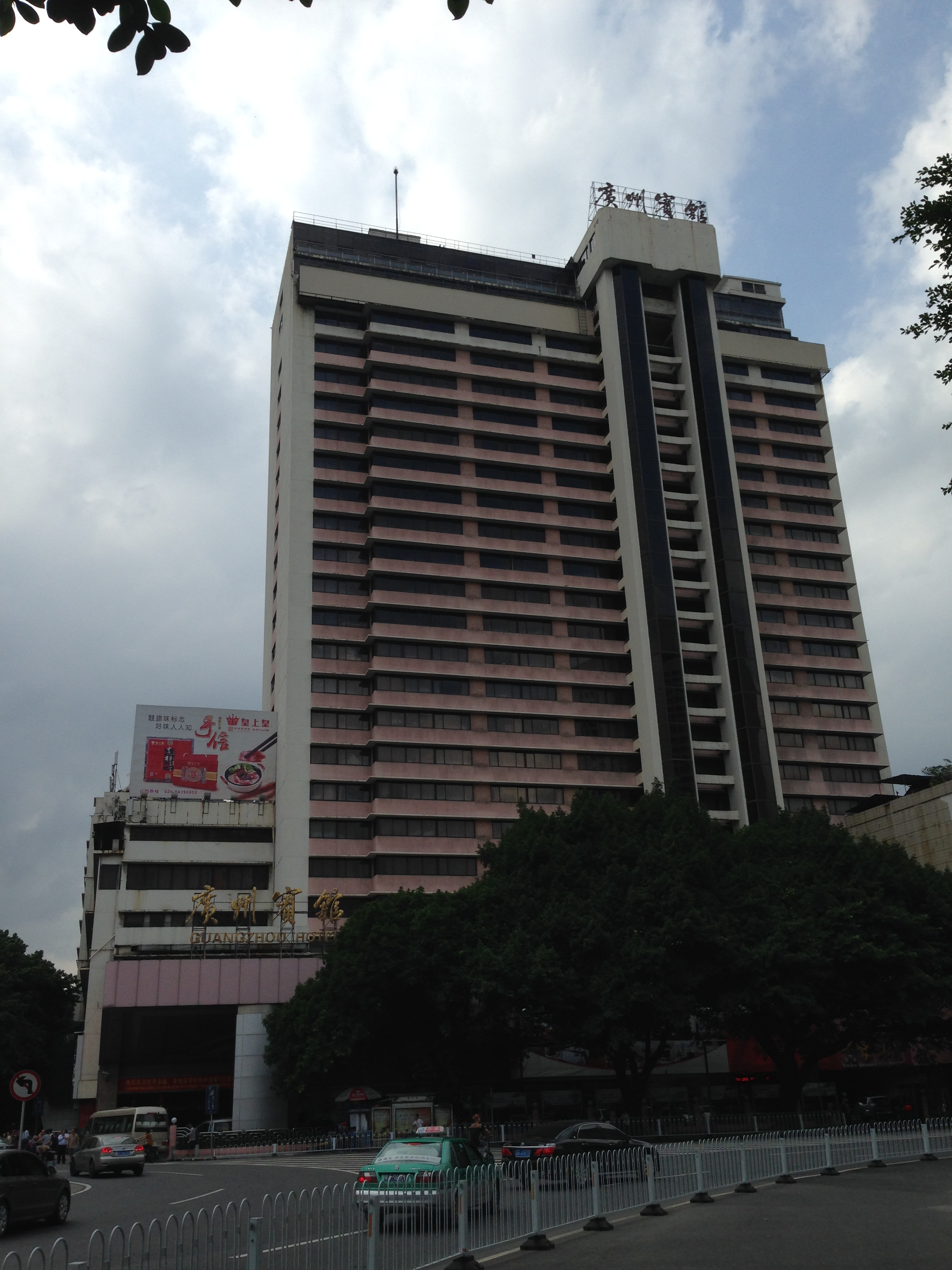
Guangzhou Hotel

Guangzhou Hotel (Chinese: 广州宾馆) is a hotel in Guangzhou, China. It was constructed in 1968 amid the Cultural Revolution. With 27 floors, on opening it surpassed Park Hotel in Shanghai as the tallest building in China.

== See also ==
- List of tallest buildings in Guangzhou
- Baiyun Hotel
