= Guangdong Business Center =

Supertall skyscraper in Guangzhou, Guangdong, China

- 广商中心
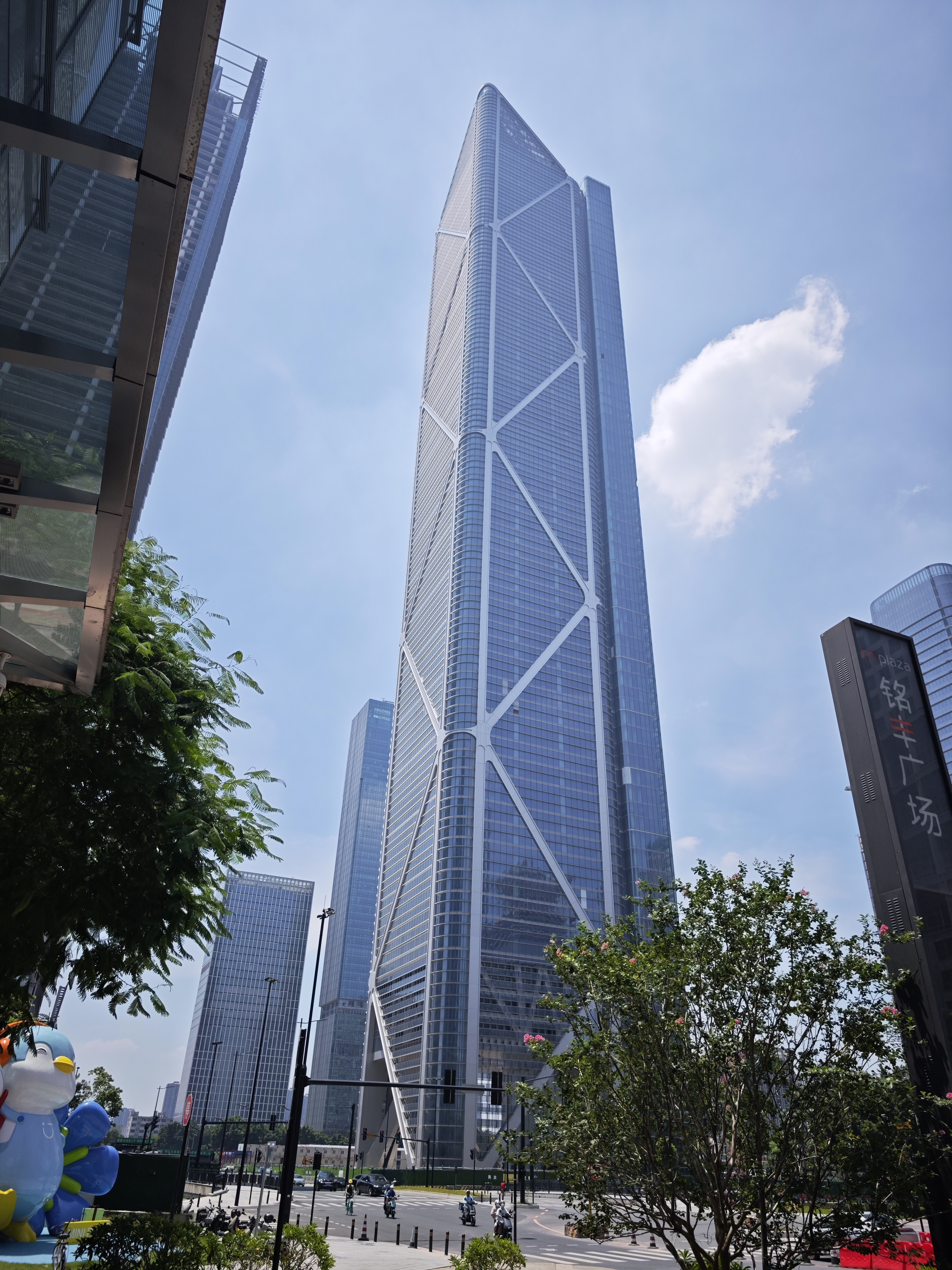
- Interactive map of the Guangdong Business Center area

General information
- Status: Completed
- Type: Mixed-use, Office, Residential
- Location: Guangzhou, China, 79, Hai Zhu Qu, Guangzhou
- Coordinates: 23.10094°N 113.34267°E
- Construction started: 2018
- Completed: 2025

Height
- Roof: 375.5 m (1,232 ft)

Technical details
- Structural system: Steel
- Floor count: 60
- Lifts/elevators: WSP Global (elevators)

Design and construction
- Architects: Skidmore, Owings & Merrill LLP; Guangzhou Design Institute
- Structural engineer: Skidmore, Owings & Merrill LLP
- Main contractor: China Construction Fourth Engineering Division Corp. Ltd

The Guangdong Business Center (Chinese: 广商中心) (also known as the Guangshang Center) is a mixed-use supertall skyscraper in Guangzhou, China. Built between 2018 and 2025, the tower stands at 375.5 m (1,232 ft) tall with 60 floors. It is the current 4th tallest building in Guangzhou.

== History ==
The tower is located in the Pazhou CBD of Haizhu District, Guangzhou City, Guangdong Province. It is the tallest skyscraper outside of Tianhe District of the Guangzhou City, and the tallest pure steel structure skyscraper in Asia. It has a height of 375.5 meters (1,232 feet) and a total of 60 floors.

== See also ==
- List of tallest buildings in China
- List of tallest buildings in Guangzhou
