= Bank of Guangzhou Tower =

Skyscraper in Guangzhou, Guangdong, China

Coordinates: 23.1249°N 113.3259°E

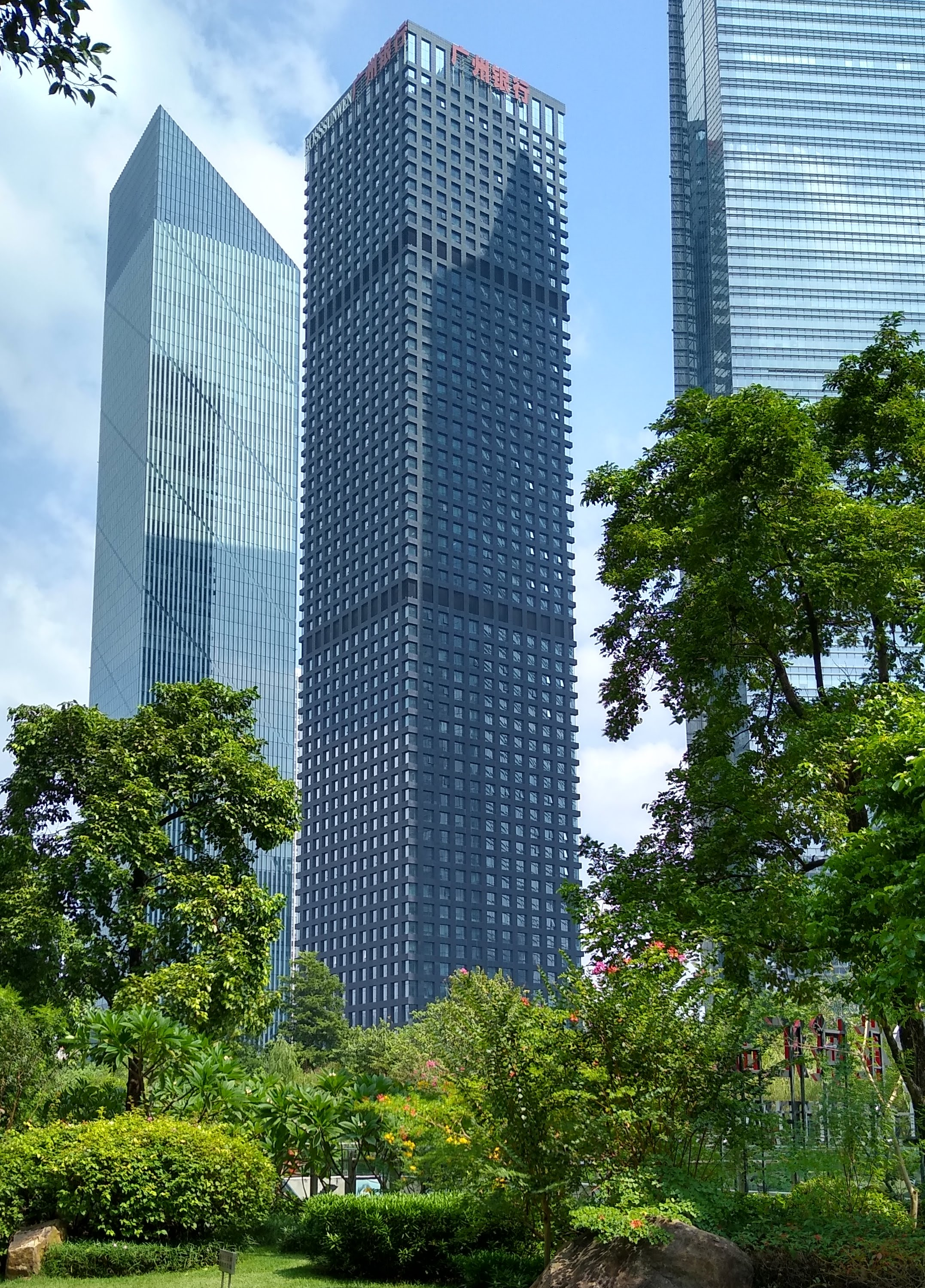
- Interactive map of the Bank of Guangzhou Tower area

General information
- Type: Commercial offices
- Construction started: 2008
- Opening: 2012
- Owner: Xu Jiyayin

Height
- Roof: 250 m (820 ft)

Technical details
- Floor count: 57

Design and construction
- Architect: Design Institute

The Bank of Guangzhou Tower is a fifty-seven-story, 268-metre (879 ft) skyscraper in Guangzhou, Guangdong, China. Construction of the tower was completed in 2012. The tower is the eighth-tallest in Guangzhou and the 168th-tallest in the world.

== See also ==
- List of tallest buildings in Guangzhou
- List of tallest buildings in China
- List of tallest buildings in Asia
- List of tallest buildings in the world
