= The Pinnacle (Guangzhou) =

Supertall skyscraper in Guangzhou, Guangdong, China

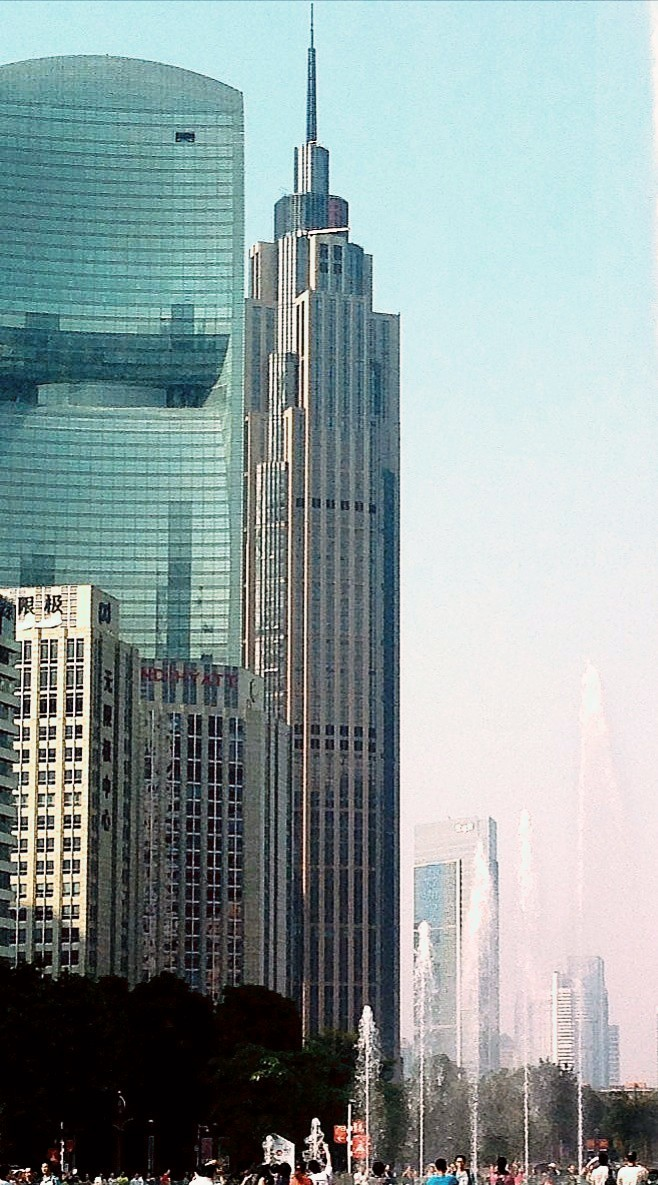
- The Pinnacle in October 2013
- Interactive map of the The Pinnacle area
- Alternative names: Grand International Mansion; Guang Sheng International Building

General information
- Status: Completed
- Type: Commercial offices
- Architectural style: Postmodern
- Location: Zhujiang Avenue West; Guangzhou, China
- Coordinates: 23.1278°N 113.3180°E
- Construction started: January 4, 2008
- Topped-out: July 17, 2011
- Completed: May 23, 2012
- Opened: June 28, 2012
- Owner: Guangdong Sheng Ming Real Estate Development Co., Ltd.

Height
- Antenna spire: 360 m (1,180 ft)
- Roof: 311.9 m (1,023 ft)
- Top floor: 264.7 m (868 ft)

Technical details
- Floor count: 60; 6 below ground
- Floor area: 118,452 m^{2} (1,275,010 sq ft)

Design and construction
- Architects: Guangzhou Hanhua Architects & Engineers
- Developer: Guangdong Sheng Ming Real Estate Development Co., Ltd.
- Structural engineer: Guangzhou Hanhua Architects & Engineers
- Main contractor: Guangzhou Municipal Construction Group JV

The Pinnacle (Chinese: 广晟国际大厦; Chinese: 廣晟國際大廈) is a 60-story, 360 m (1,180 ft)-tall skyscraper in the Tianhe District of Guangzhou, Guangdong, China. It is the fifth-tallest building in Guangzhou.
