= R&F Yingkai Square =

Skyscraper in Guangzhou, Guangdong, China

Coordinates: 23°7′7.1364″N 113°19′10.5636″E

- 富力盈凯广场
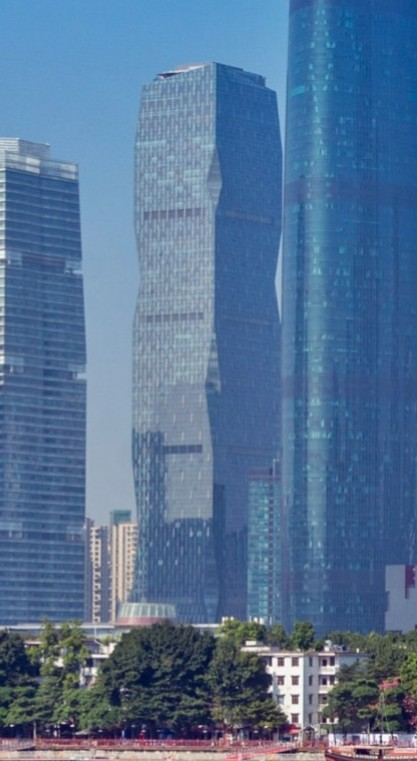
- R&F Yingkai Square in December 2016
- Interactive map of the R&F Yingkai Square area

General information
- Status: Completed
- Type: Skyscraper
- Location: 16 Huaxia Rd, Tianhe District, Guangzhou, China
- Construction started: 2008
- Completed: 2014
- Owner: Guangzhou R & F Properties Co., Ltd.

Height
- Top floor: 296.2 metres (972 ft)

Technical details
- Floor count: 66 (+5 underground)
- Floor area: 174500 m^{2}

Design and construction
- Architect: Goettsch Partners
- Main contractor: Guangzhou R & F Properties Co., Ltd.

R&F Yingkai Square (Chinese: 富力盈凯广场) is a late-modernist skyscraper in Guangzhou, China completed in 2014. The cutouts in its design are said to imitate the structure of bamboo.

It houses the 208-unit Park Hyatt Guangzhou hotel, as well as 114,500 m^{2} of office space and a further 10,000 m^{2} of retail space.

== See also ==
- List of tallest buildings in Guangzhou
- List of tallest buildings in China
