= Nanfang Building =

Building in Guangzhou, China

- 南方大厦
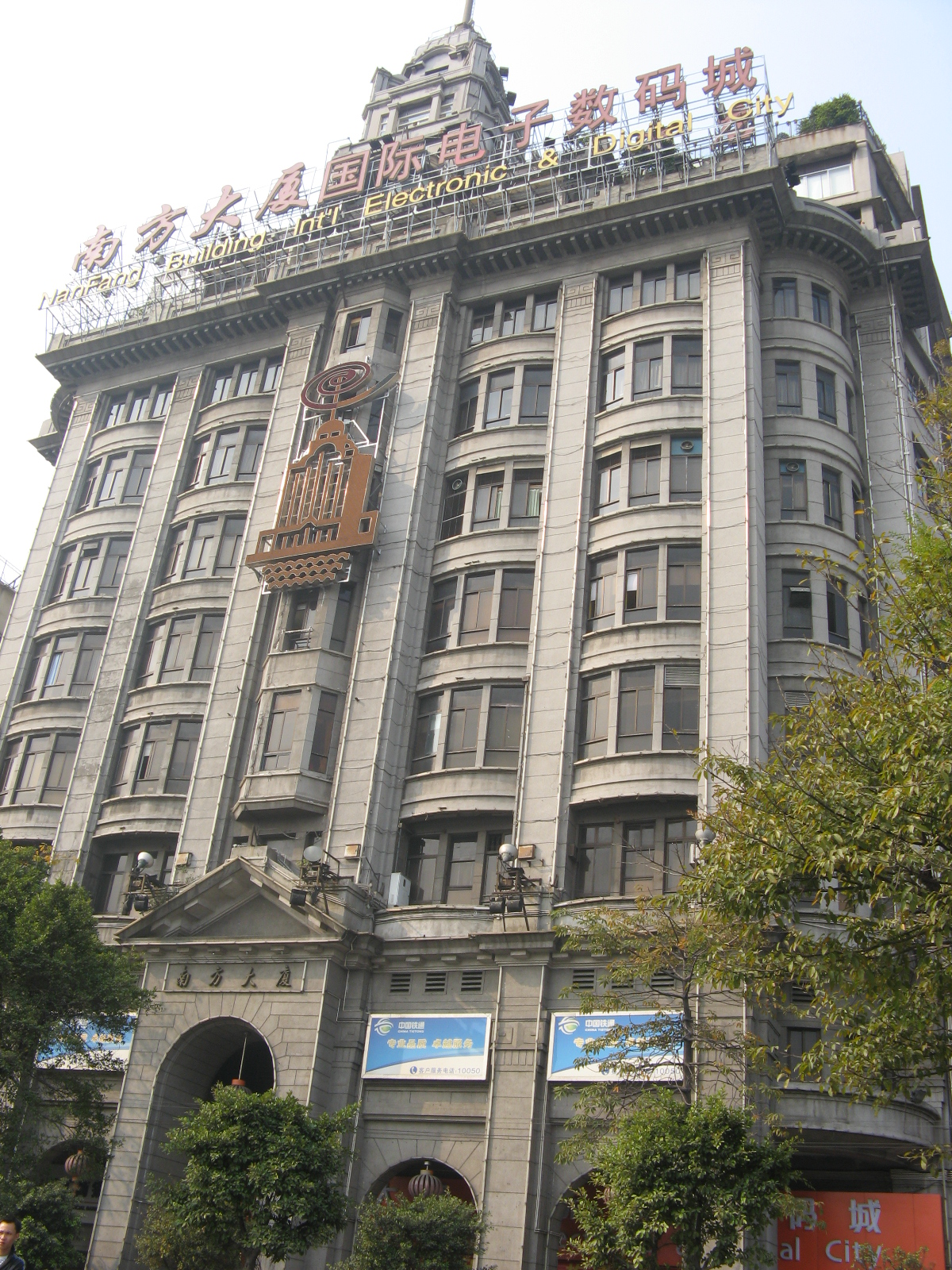

- Location within Guangdong Location within China

General information
- Location: Liwan, Guangzhou, China
- Coordinates: 23.108045°N 113.2507844°E
- Completed: 1922

Nanfang Building (Chinese: 南方大厦) is a historic high-rise building in Guangzhou, China. At the time of its completion in 1922, it was the tallest building in the country. Since then, it has served as offices, department stores, electronics markets, and hotels.

== See also ==
- Aiqun Hotel
- List of tallest buildings in Guangzhou
