= Baiyun Hotel =

Hotel in Guangzhou, China

Coordinates: 23.1404°N 113.2808°E

- Simplified Chinese: 白云宾馆
- Traditional Chinese: 白雲賓館
Transcriptions
Standard Mandarin
- Hanyu Pinyin: Báiyún Bīnguǎn
Yue: Cantonese
- Jyutping: baak6 wan4 ban1 gun2

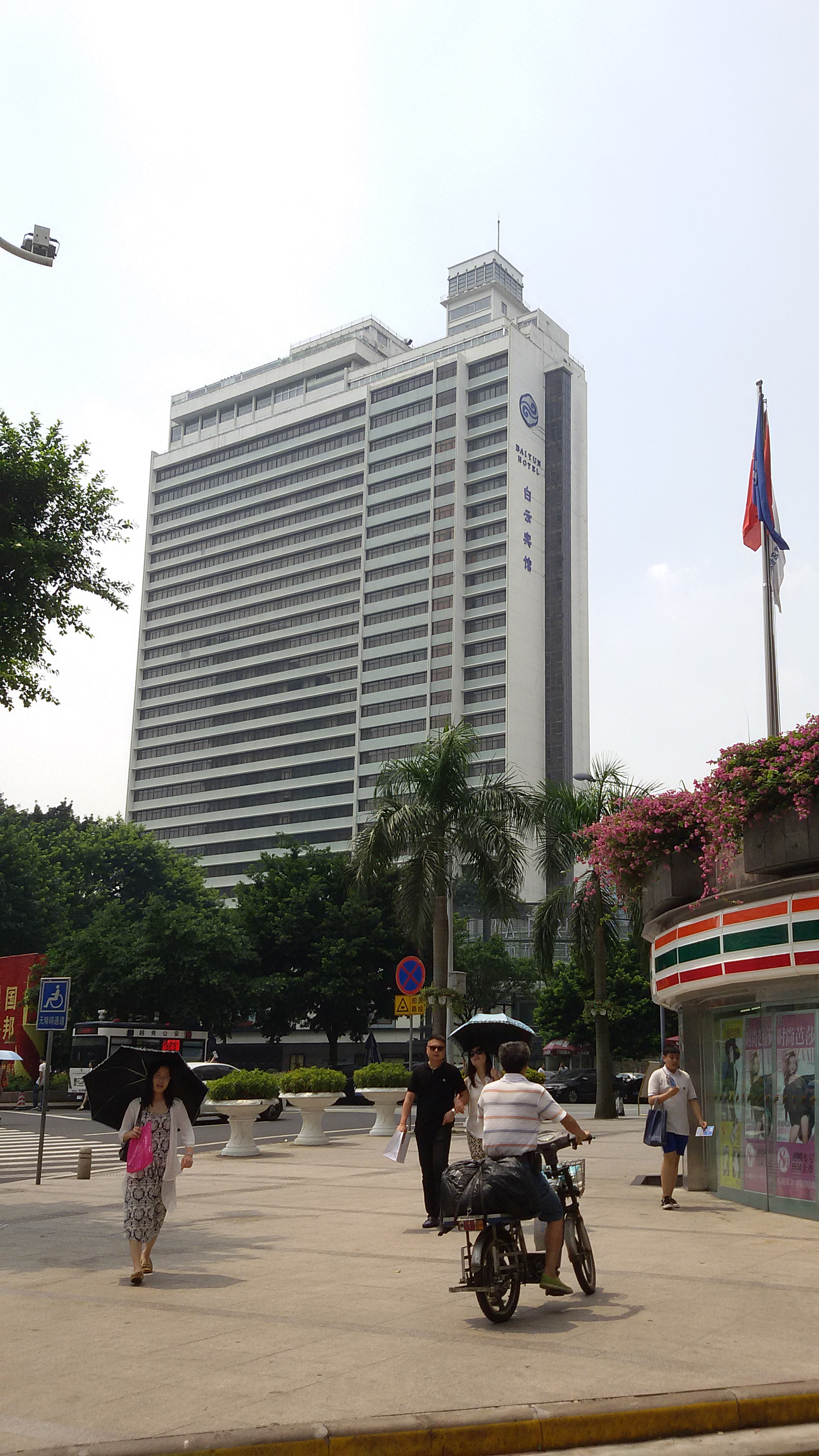
Baiyun Hotel

Baiyun Hotel (Chinese: 白云宾馆) is a hotel in Guangzhou, China. Standing 93.5 meters tall, and 117 meters with antenna, with 34 floors, it surpassed Guangzhou Hotel to be the tallest building in the country upon its completion in 1976 and remained so until 1981 when Jinling Hotel of Nanjing, 110 meters, was built. If including antenna, it was still the tallest until 1985 when it was surpassed by Guomao Building in Shenzhen.

== See also ==
- List of tallest buildings in Guangzhou
