= Global City Square =

Supertall skyscraper in Guangzhou, Guangdong, China

Coordinates: 23.1180°N 113.3197°E

- 环球都会广场
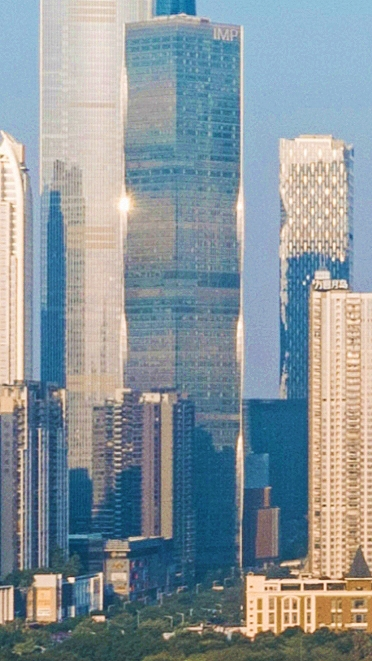
- Global City Square (IMP) in December 2019
- Interactive map of the Global City Square area
- Alternative names: International Metropolitan Plaza

General information
- Status: Completed
- Location: Guangzhou, China
- Groundbreaking: 2010
- Construction started: August 6, 2011
- Completed: October 7, 2016

Height
- Height: 318.9 m (1,046 ft)

Technical details
- Floor count: 67

Global City Square (Chinese: 环球都会广场; pinyin: huánqíu dūhuì guǎngchǎng), also known as International Metropolitan Plaza (simply known as IMP), is a skyscraper in the Zhujiang New Town, Tianhe District of Guangzhou City, Guangdong Province, China. Upon completion in 2016, it became the 5th tallest building in Guangzhou at 318.9 metres (1,046 ft) and contains 180,649 square metres (1,944,490 sq ft) of floor space.

== See also ==
- List of tallest buildings in China
- List of tallest buildings in Guangzhou
