= Poly Pazhou =

Skyscraper in Guangzhou, Guangdong, China

Poly Pazhou Complex
- 保利发展广场
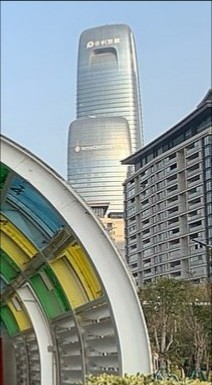
- Interactive map of the Poly Pazhou Complex area

General information
- Status: Completed
- Type: Mixed-use, Office, Hotel / Serviced Apartments
- Location: Guangzhou, China, 494H+9VC, Pazhou, Hai Zhu Qu, Guangzhou, 510655
- Coordinates: 23.10613°N 113.37964°E
- Construction started: 2013
- Completed: 2017

Height
- Roof: 311 m (1,020 ft) (Tower C2); 198 m (650 ft) (Exhibition Center or Tower C1); 96 m (315 ft) (Tower 1); 96 m (315 ft) (Tower 2); 96 m (315 ft) (Tower 3)

Technical details
- Structural system: Reinforced concrete
- Floor count: 60 (Tower C2); 40 (Exhibition Center or Tower C1); 22 (Tower 1); 22 (Tower 2); 19 (Tower 3)
- Floor area: 205,000 m^{2} (2,210,000 sq ft) (entire complex)
- Lifts/elevators: WSP Global (elevators)

Design and construction
- Architect: Skidmore, Owings & Merrill LLP
- Structural engineer: Skidmore, Owings & Merrill LLP (structure); ALT Limited (façade); Lerch Bates (façade maintenance)
- Main contractor: China Construction Fourth Engineering Division Corp. Ltd

The Poly Pazhou Complex (Chinese: 保利发展广场) (also known as the Poly Skyline Plaza) is a mixed-use supertall building complex in Guangzhou, China. Built between 2013 and 2017, the complex consists of five towers with the tallest one (Tower C2) standing at 311 m (1,020 ft) tall with 60 floors. Four of the tower suite solely contain the function of office buildings, while one of them (Exhibition Center or Tower C1) shares the office function with the Hotelier and Serviced Apartments functions. Tower C1 is the first supertall building to be constructed outside the Tianhe District and th current tallest building in the Haizhu District.

== History ==
=== Architecture ===
The building complex is situated in the Pazhou Island in the Haizhu District of Guangzhou, in the immediate proximity of the Pearl River. The project is skylined by two higher-rise main towers. The C2 Tower, with 61 floors and a top floor height of 265.3 meters, has an architectural height of 311 meters, making it the taller of the two towers. The height of the C1 Tower is 197.5 meters tall, consisting of 39 levels with the highest floor reaching 155.6 meters in height. Each tower features a "gaze" positioned above the highest floor, measuring more than 12 meters wide and almost 20 meters deep, creating a breezy tunnel.

Rostek solutions assist in the upkeep of Poly Pazhou's facade maintenance. 76 meters of climbing twin monorail system with 3D bendings are set up on the inner roof of both "eyes." The distance between the tracks is roughly 10 meters, allowing the custom telescopic BMU cradle to glide smoothly along them. A total of 142 meters of monorail track and the telescopic suspended platform were provided to improve maintenance efficiency for the top floor levels. Two aluminium davits, each measuring 4 meters in height, were installed in the podium area along with a 2.9 meter long hanging platform.

== Buildings ==
Name	Image	Height m (ft)	Floors	Function
Tower 1		311 m (1,020 ft)	60	Office
Tower 2		198 m (650 ft)	40	Hotel; Serviced Apartments
Tower 3		96 m (315 ft)	22	Office
Tower 4		96 m (315 ft)	22	Office
Tower 5		83 m (272 ft)	19	Office

== See also ==
- List of tallest buildings in China
- List of tallest buildings in Guangzhou
