= Oi Kwan Hotel =

Hotel in Guangzhou, Guangdong, China

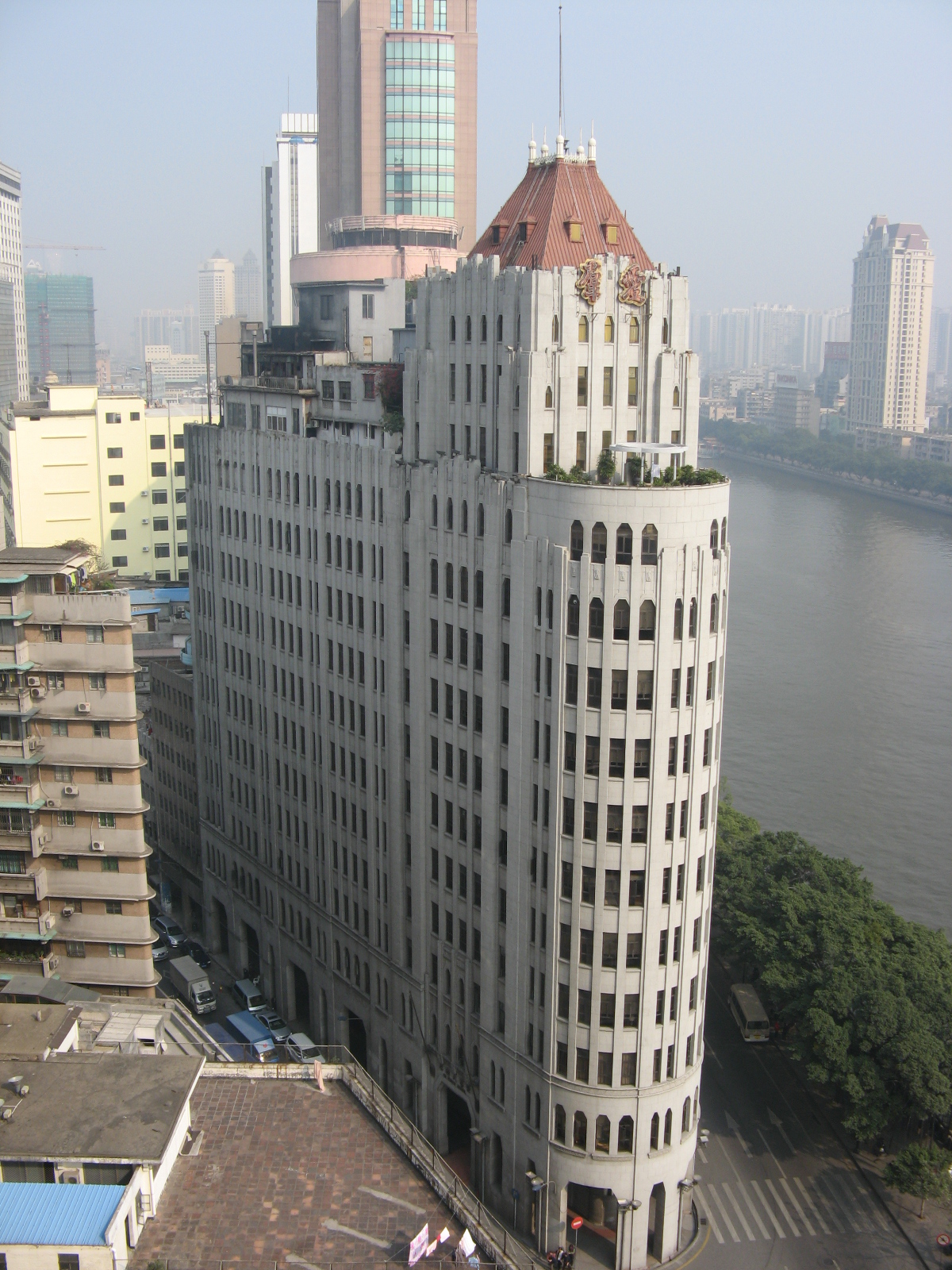

- Location within Guangdong Location within China

General information
- Architectural style: Art Deco
- Location: Guangzhou, China
- Coordinates: 23.1095601°N 113.2550009°E

The Oi Kwan Hotel (Chinese: 爱群大酒店) is a hotel in Art Deco style in Guangzhou, China. At 64 metres tall with 15 floors, it surpassed the neighbouring Nanfang Building to become the tallest building in the city from upon its completion in 1937 to 1967.

The hotel has a revolving restaurant on the top floor. This was the first one in the city.

== See also ==
- List of tallest buildings in Guangzhou
