= Huijin Center Guangzhou =

Supertall skyscraper in Guangzhou, Guangdong, China

Huijin Center
- 汇金中心
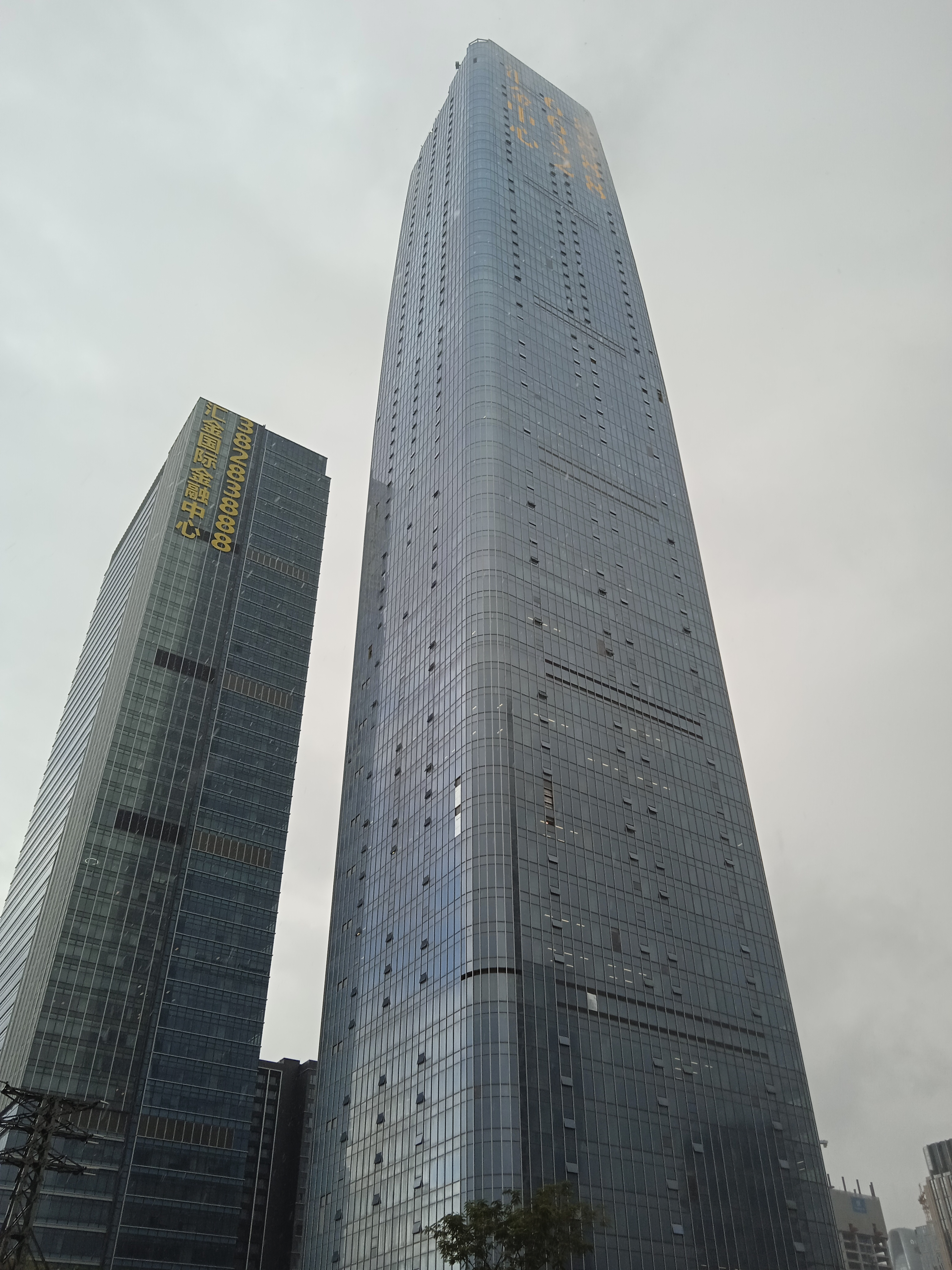
- Interactive map of the Huijin Center area

General information
- Status: Completed
- Type: Office
- Location: Guangzhou, China, 650 Huangpu Road, Tianhe District, Guangzhou 正南方向70米 邮政编码: 510655
- Coordinates: 23.11826°N 113.38020°E
- Construction started: 2014 (Tower 1); 2015 (Tower 2)
- Completed: 2022 (both)
- Owner: Shimao Group

Height
- Roof: 320.6 m (1,052 ft) (Tower 1); 220 m (720 ft) (Tower 2)

Technical details
- Structural system: Reinforced concrete
- Floor count: 69 (Tower 1); 50 (Tower 2)
- Floor area: 400,000 m^{2} (4,310,000 sq ft) (entire complex)
- Lifts/elevators: Schindler Group

Design and construction
- Architect: Gensler
- Structural engineer: WSP Global; Forster Engineering Consultants Co., Ltd. (Façade); Woods Bagot (interiors)

The Huijin Center Guangzhou (Chinese: 汇金中心) (also known as the Shimao Canton Financial Center (Tower 1)) is an office building complex in Guangzhou, China. Built between 2014 and 2022, the complex consists of two towers standing at 320.6 m (1,052 ft) tall with 69 floors (Tower 1), respectively 220 m (720 ft) tall with 50 floors (Tower 2).

== History ==
=== Architecture ===
Situated on a busy road overlooking the Huangpu District, the complex is considered one of Guangzhou's top three landmark projects due to its ambitious planning, significant investment, and government support. The Guangzhou Huijin International Center will play a key role in advancing Guangzhou's industrial sector, fostering growth in the high-end financial industry, and drawing in multinational financial companies.

== See also ==
- List of tallest buildings in China
- List of tallest buildings in Guangzhou
