= Victory Plaza =

Skyscraper in Guangzhou, Guangdong, China

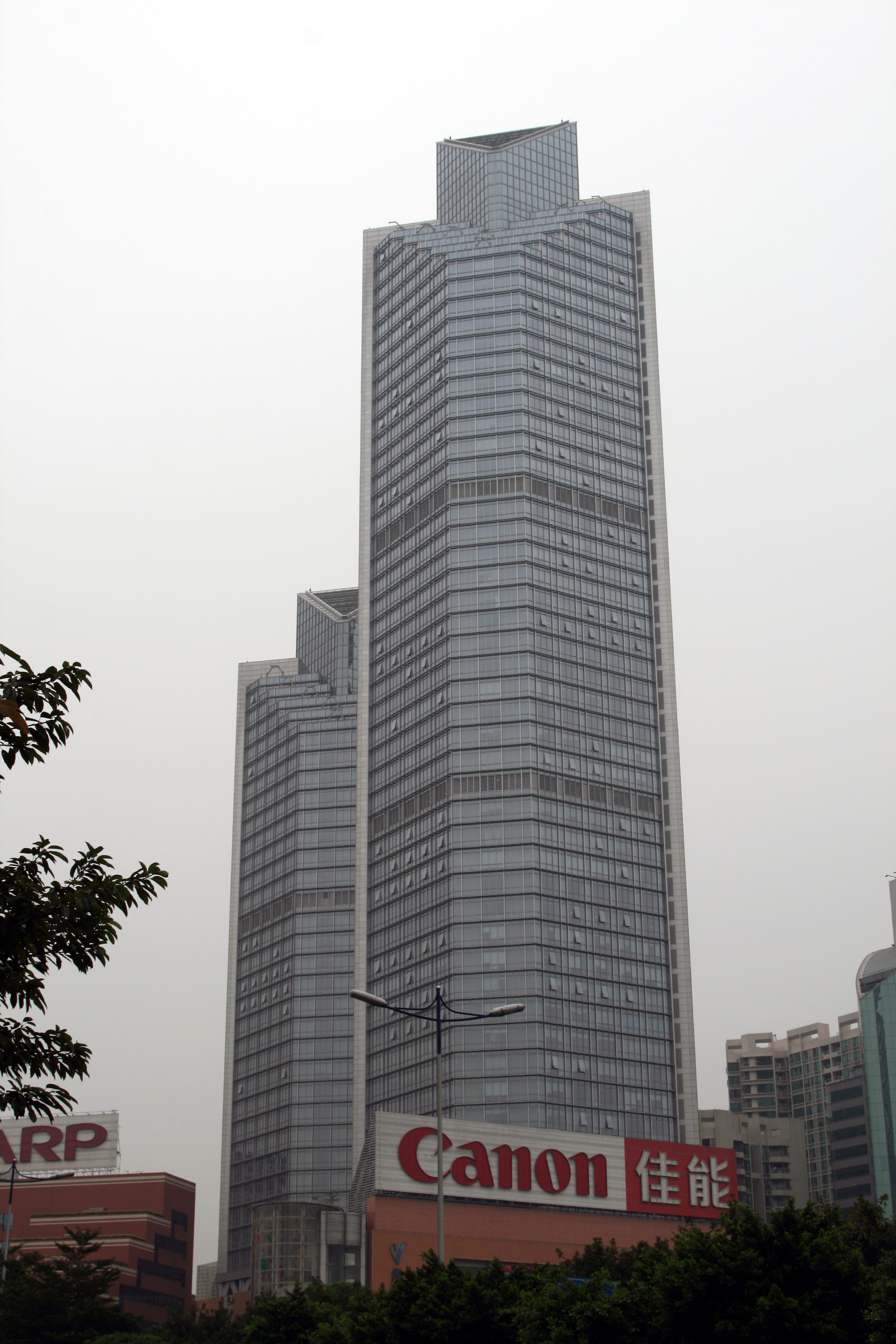
- Interactive map of the Victory Plaza area

General information
- Status: Completed
- Type: Commercial offices
- Architectural style: Modernism
- Location: 101 Tianhe Road; Guangzhou, China
- Coordinates: 23.13753°N 113.31592°E
- Construction started: 2004
- Completed: 2007

Height
- Roof: Tower A: 222 m (728 ft); Tower B: 150.58 m (494.0 ft)

Technical details
- Floor count: Tower A: 52; Tower B: 36
- Floor area: 143,000 m^{2} (1,540,000 sq ft)

Design and construction
- Developer: Guangzhou City Construction & Development Holdings Ltd.

Victory Plaza is a twin tower skyscraper complex in the Tianhe District of Guangzhou, Guangdong, China. Tower A is 222 m (728 ft) with 52 storeys, while Tower B is 150.58 m (494.0 ft) with 36 floors. Construction of Victory Plaza was completed in 2007.

== Tenants ==
All Nippon Airways operates its Guangzhou Office in Tower A. It was previously located in CITIC Plaza.

== See also ==
- List of tallest buildings in Guangzhou
