= Guangzhou CTF Finance Centre =

Supertall skyscraper in Guangzhou, Guangdong, China

- 广州周大福中心
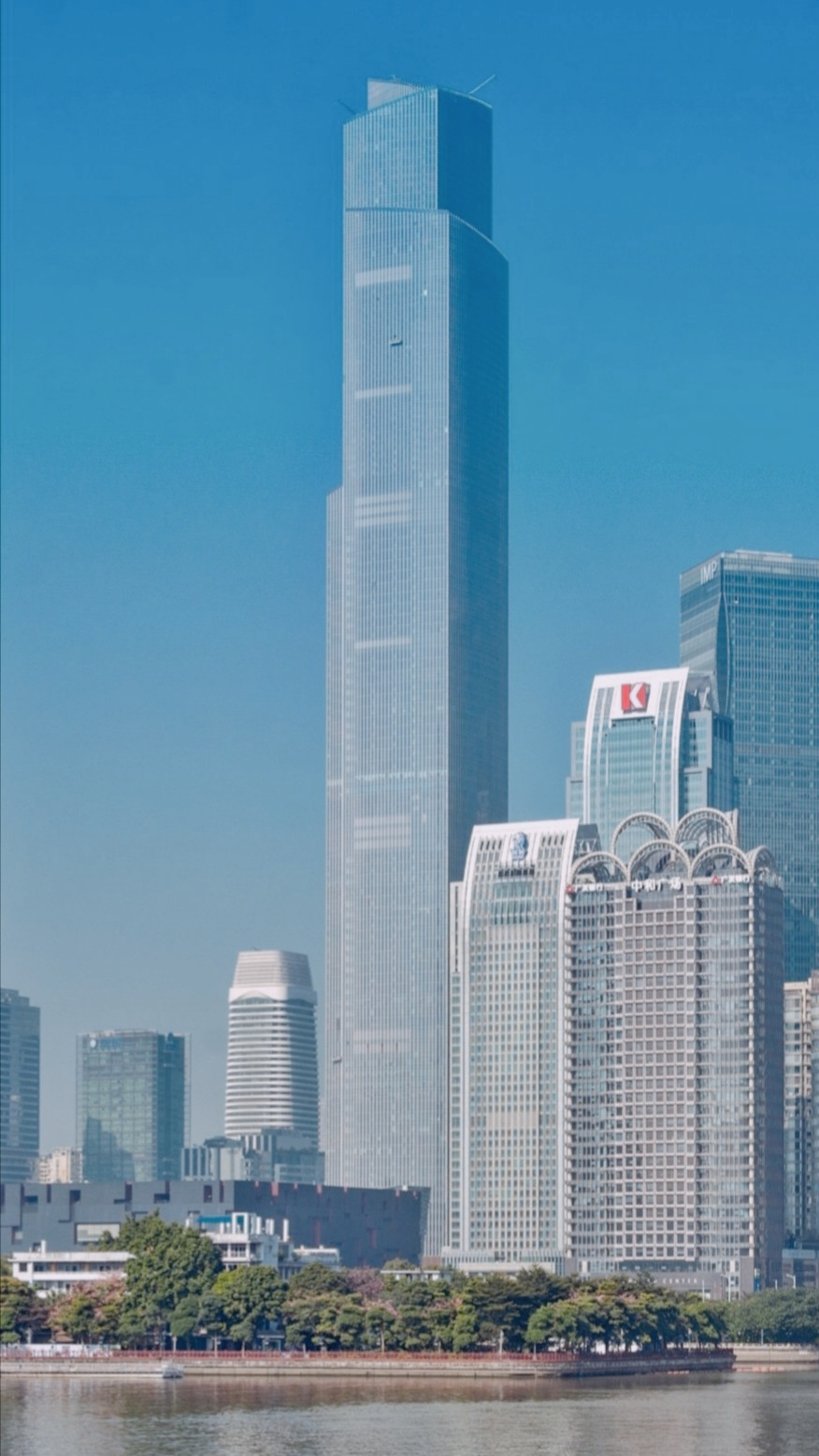
- Guangzhou CTF Finance Centre in December 2016
- Alternative names: Guangzhou Twin Tower 2 Guangzhou East Tower Chow Tai Fook Centre 周大福商业中心 周大福商業中心

General information
- Status: Completed
- Type: Mixed-use: Office, Residential, Hotel
- Location: Zhujiang East Road, Zhujiang New Town, Tianhe District, Guangzhou, Guangdong, China
- Groundbreaking: 29 September 2009
- Construction started: 29 July 2010
- Opened: October 2016
- Owner: Chow Tai Fook Enterprises

Height
- Architectural: 530 m (1,739 ft)
- Tip: 530 m (1,739 ft)
- Roof: 518 m (1,699 ft)
- Top floor: 496 m (1,626 ft)

Technical details
- Floor count: 111 (+5 below ground)
- Floor area: 507,681.0 m^{2} (5,464,633 sq ft)
- Lifts/elevators: 95

Design and construction
- Architecture firm: Kohn Pedersen Fox
- Developer: New World Development
- Structural engineer: Arup Group
- Services engineer: WSP USA, formerly Parsons Brinckerhoff (MEP)
- Main contractor: China State Construction Engineering

Other information
- Number of rooms: Apartments: 355; Hotel rooms: 251
- Parking: 1,705 spaces

Guangzhou CTF Finance Centre
- Simplified Chinese: 广州周大福中心
- Traditional Chinese: 廣州周大福中心
Transcriptions
Standard Mandarin
- Hanyu Pinyin: Guǎngzhōu Zhōu Dà Fú Zhōngxīn
Yue: Cantonese
- Jyutping: gwong^{2}zau^{1} zau^{1} daai^{6} fuk^{1} zung^{1}sam^{1}

Guangzhou East Tower
- Simplified Chinese: 广州东塔
- Traditional Chinese: 廣州東塔
Transcriptions
Standard Mandarin
- Hanyu Pinyin: Guǎngzhōu Dōngtǎ
Yue: Cantonese
- Jyutping: gwong^{2}zau^{1} dung^{1}taap^{3}

The Guangzhou Chow Tai Fook Finance Centre (广州周大福金融中心), also called East Tower, is a 530-metre (1,739 ft) mixed-use supertall skyscraper in Guangzhou, Guangdong, China, which was completed in October 2016. It is the tallest completed building in Guangzhou, the third-tallest in China, and the eighth-tallest in the world. The Guangzhou CTF Finance Centre has a total of 111 above ground and five below ground floors and houses a shopping mall, offices, apartments, and a hotel. The skyscraper has a gross floor area of 507,681.0 square metres (5,464,633 sq ft), of which a little over 20% is not part of the skyscraper itself, but of the podium connected to it.

The Guangzhou CTF Finance Centre is situated on a 27,000-square-metre (290,000 sq ft) lot along Zhujiang East Road in Zhujiang New Town, Guangzhou's central business district. In that neighbourhood, the skyscraper is located east of the central axis with an underground mall and connections to public transportation underneath it. The Guangzhou CTF Centre is part of the Guangzhou Twin Towers. The other tower of the pair, the 439-metre (1,439 ft) tall Guangzhou International Finance Center, is located on the other side of the axis and is also known under the name "West Tower". The Guangzhou CTF Centre is therefore known as the "East Tower" as well. Both towers have a similar height, size, and function, and are situated close to the 604 m (1,982 ft) tall Canton Tower.

The Guangzhou CTF Finance Centre is owned by Chow Tai Fook Enterprises, and houses the world's fastest elevators, which can reach speeds up to 21 metres per second (69 feet per second).

== Architecture ==
The Guangzhou CTF Finance Centre consists of a skyscraper and an eight-floor podium, that is connected to the skyscraper. The podium features a 30 m (100 ft) high atrium with a glass roof. The skyscraper is supported by a square core with sides of 32 m (105 ft) and eight concrete mega columns on the sides. They are linked by outriggers and belt trusses, that are located exclusively on mechanical and refuge floors. The skyscraper has a total of four levels of steel outriggers and six sets of double-layer belt trusses. Smaller columns are in between the mega columns. The mega columns have a length up to 5.0 m (16 1/2 ft) and a width up to 3.5 m (11 1/2 ft). They are thicker than usual to meet the Chinese seismic codes and they are supported by a mat and pad foundation. This foundation sits on relatively high bedrock.

The facade of the skyscraper is made out of glass and has vertical mullions, made out of white glazed terracotta. The mullions are projecting out from the windows to create shades. The windows are operable and there are vents between them and the terracotta. Aluminum fins are located next to the vents to protect them from the wind. White LEDs are integrated into the fins to light the terracotta at night. The terracotta mullions make the exterior of the building lighter. It was not possible to create the brightness of the building by using lighter glass, since the local environmental codes do not allow more reflective glass. More standard metal mullions would have created this effect as well, but architect Forth Bagley, who lead the design, said in an interview with CNN they had chosen consciously for terracotta "to inject into the architecture an indigenous craft, that was specific to Guangzhou as a city." Furthermore, he said about the design that the skyscraper was not only set apart from the surrounding towers "by virtue of its height [...], but also by its simplicity."

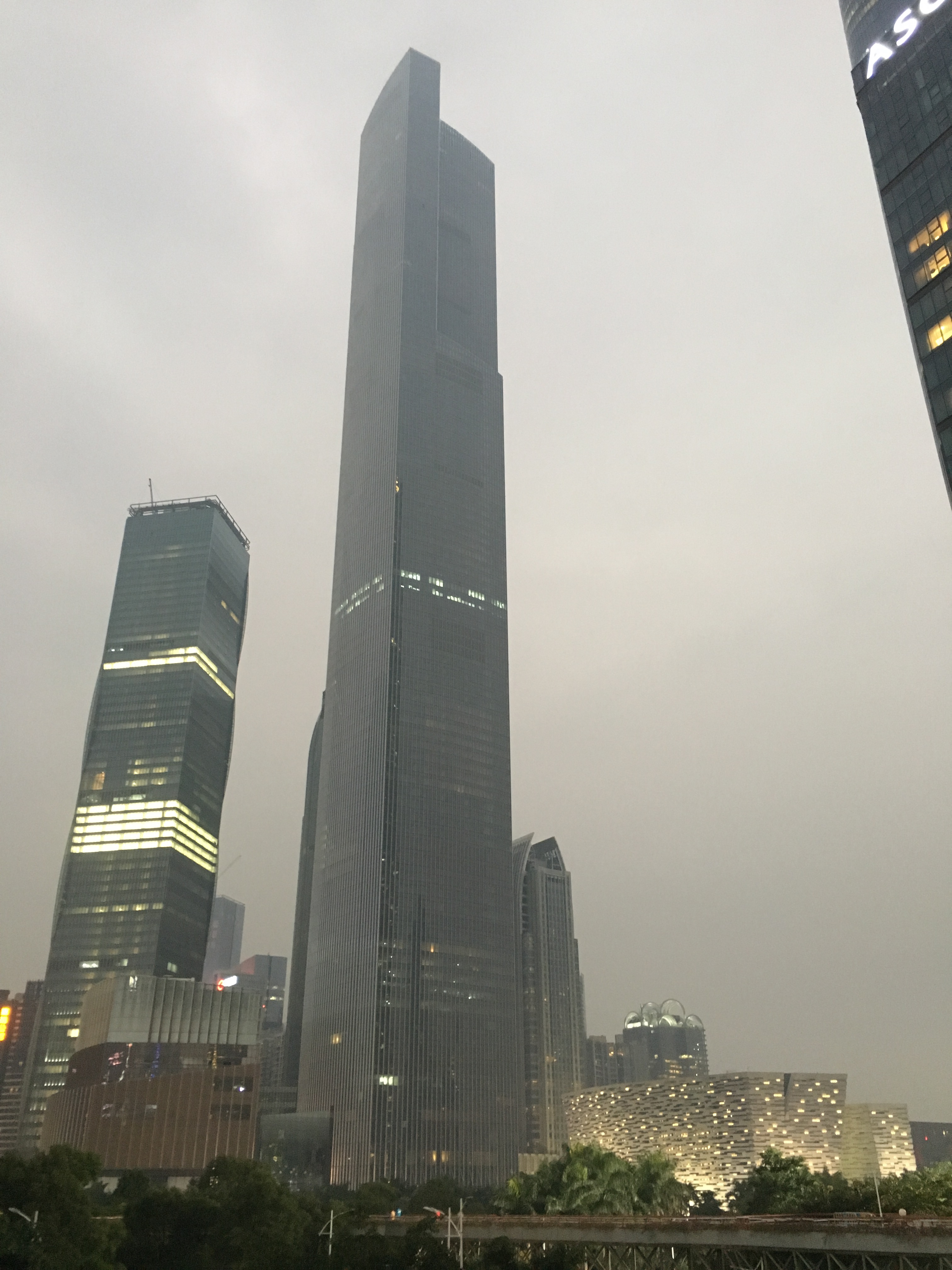
The skyscraper in December 2015

The shape of the Guangzhou CTF Finance Centre is defined by its mixed-usage: the different uses require different floor sizes and the building is shaped to accommodate those demands. Namely, the skyscraper has setbacks at points where the usage changes: the setbacks are located between the offices and the apartments, between the apartments and the hotel, and between the hotel and the crown of the building. The setbacks are angled and contain parapets with sky terraces. The top of the building is angled as well, but doesn't contain a sky terrace. The angled parapets point at the tops of various nearby tall buildings. Because of the setbacks, the building looks different from every angle.

Different techniques were used to make the Guangzhou CTF Finance Centre more environmentally friendly. For example, it has efficient chillers and the podium's roof features solar panels. Moreover, the heat from the condensers of the chillers is recovered. The office and retail parts of the Guangzhou CTF Finance Centre together received a LEED Gold certification in 2018 after having received a pre-certification in 2013.

=== Layout ===
The below ground floors and the podium of the Guangzhou CTF Finance Centre feature a shopping mall and an underground parking facility with 1,705 spaces. The shopping mall is called "K11 Art Mall" and is owned by K11, a subsidiary of Chow Tai Fook Enterprises. It features a 4DX cinema with eight rooms and occupies the entire eight-floor podium and two below ground floors. The mall's surface area amounts to around 70,000 m^{2} (750,000 sq ft). The base of the actual skyscraper is occupied by the office lobby, the entrance hall of the apartments and a part of the hotel. The Guangzhou CTF Finance Centre is connected to other nearby buildings through outdoor pedestrian bridges and to subway lines 3, 5, and APM through underground links.

The offices occupy the floors 7 through 66, but are interrupted by two mechanical floors. Next to the 208,828.0 m^{2} (2,247,806 sq ft) (GFA) of Class A office space, the office floors house a sky lobby and a 150-person auditorium. The office floors are owned by K11. 24 floors with a total of 355 serviced apartments are situated above another mechanical floor and a setback. They are owned by Rosewood Hotel Group and have a total area of 71,000 m^{2} (760,000 sq ft). 23 of those "Rosewood Residences" are duplex apartments and some apartments have their own elevators and indoor courtyards. The apartments were designed by Perception Design.

The highest sixteen floors are occupied by a hotel, that is separated from the apartments by another mechanical floor. The hotel, that opened in the second half of 2019, is managed by Rosewood Hotels & Resorts and has a total of 251 rooms with a minimum size of 55.0 m^{2} (592 sq ft). The floor area of the entire hotel amounts to 41,000 m^{2} (440,000 sq ft). It also features meeting spaces, a ballroom, an indoor pool and seven cafes and restaurants. The sky bar and restaurant on the 107th floor are partly situated on an outdoor terrace. The meeting spaces cover an area of 2,250 m^{2} (24,200 sq ft) and the ballroom, that fits 700 people, covers an area of 970 m^{2} (10,440 sq ft). Most of the interior of the hotel was designed by design firm Yabu Pushelberg. The setback above the hotel is covered with three terraces. The strong winds are not felt on those terraces because of the chiseled parapets.

=== Elevators ===
The Guangzhou CTF Finance Centre has 95 elevators made by Hitachi, including two elevators that are the world's fastest. In 2014, Hitachi announced that those two elevators would be able to reach 1,200 m/min (3,900 ft/min) and would carry passengers through the 440-metre (1,450 ft) long shaft from the first to the 95th floor in approximately 43 seconds. These two elevators are used to bring hotel guests from the entrance to the lobby. In May 2016, the elevators were first tested and reached the promised maximum speed. In June 2017, the elevators were tested after having modified them to be able to deliver an even faster speed above the rated speed of 20 m/s, and they managed to reach a top speed of 21 m/s (69 ft/s). This exceeded the top speed Shanghai Tower's elevators could deliver which was a top speed of 20.5 m/s (67 ft/s), making the lifts within the Guangzhou CTF Finance Centre the world's fastest. In September 2019, the elevator received a Guinness World Record title as the world's fastest.

To achieve their top speed, the elevators in the Guangzhou CTF Finance Centre use permanent magnet synchronous motors. The air pressure is adjusted in order to prevent ear blockages and the elevators have rollers to smoothen the ride. Additionally, the emergency brakes can withstand temperatures up to 300 °C (572 °F). Besides the two fastest elevators, the building has 28 double-deck elevators (with speeds of 150–450 m/min.), 13 high-speed elevators (210–600 m/min.), and 52 medium- and low-speed elevators. The designers chose for double-deck elevators in order to minimize the number of elevator shafts. The offices, apartments, and the hotel all have separate elevators.

== Development and construction ==
The Guangzhou CTF Finance Centre was first meant to be similar to the Guangzhou International Finance Center, that is situated on the other side of the central axis of Zhujiang New Town, but it was decided to make the new skyscraper taller and to give it a different shape. The developer of the Guangzhou CTF Finance Centre, New World Development, which is a subsidiary of Chow Tai Fook Enterprises, held a competition to design the building. The American firm Kohn Pedersen Fox won the competition in 2009 and thus became the main architect. The Guangzhou Design Institute and Leigh & Orange became the architects of record and the British Arup Group was chosen to engineer the building. The groundbreaking took place on September 29, 2009 – about half a year after the designing process started. China State Construction Engineering was the contractor. The Guangzhou CTF Finance Centre was topped out in July 2014 and the cladding was finished by the end of 2015. In October 2016, the skyscraper was completed.

When construction started, it was scheduled to open in the first quarter of 2016. Moreover, it was estimated back then that the building would cost more than RMB10 billion (about US$1.5 billion as of September 2009).

== Gallery ==
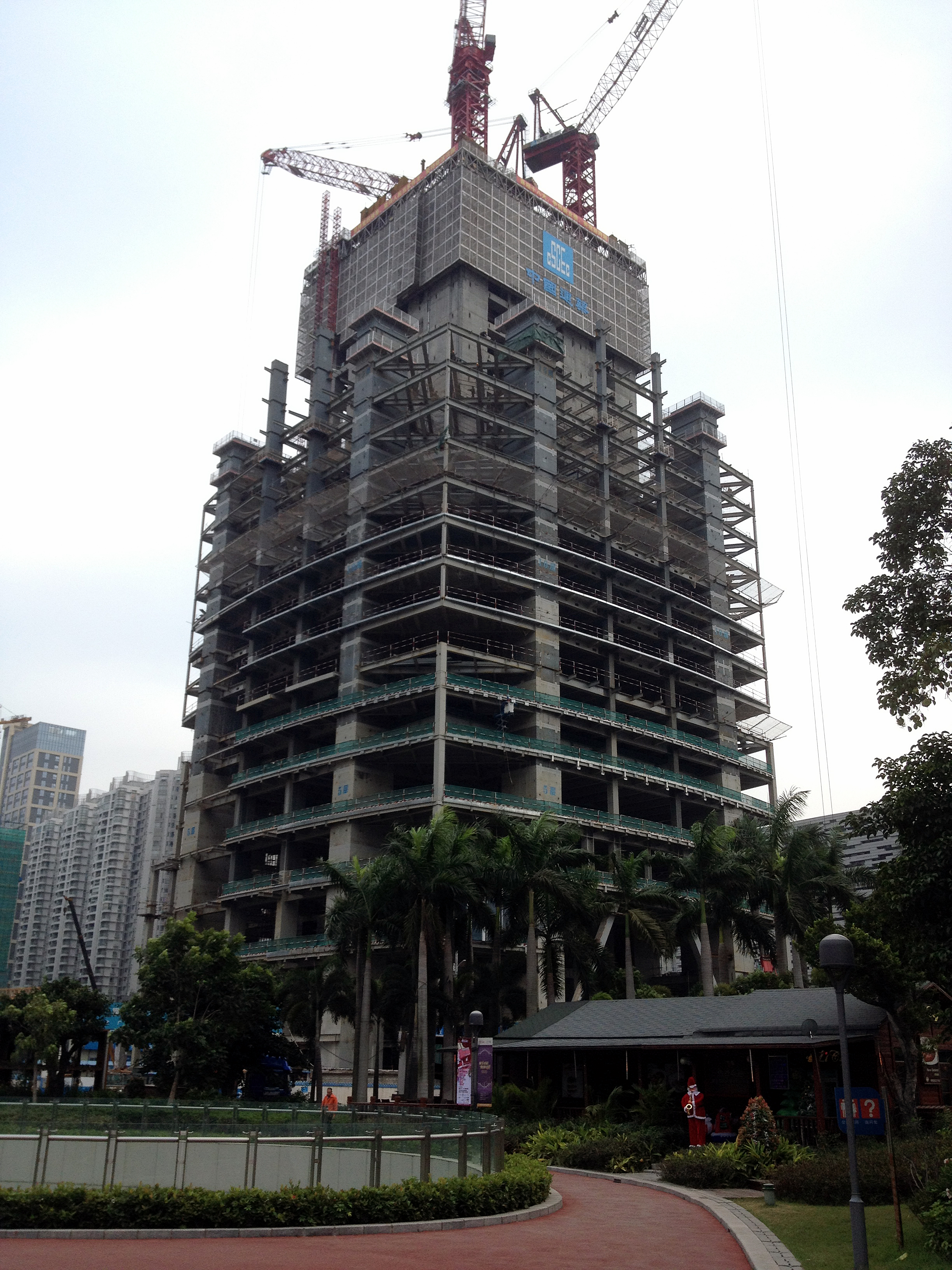
The skyscraper under construction in December 2012

== See also ==
- Guangzhou International Finance Center
- List of tallest buildings in Guangzhou
- List of buildings with 100 floors or more
