= CITIC Plaza =

Supertall skyscraper in Guangzhou, Guangdong, China

CITIC Plaza 中信广场
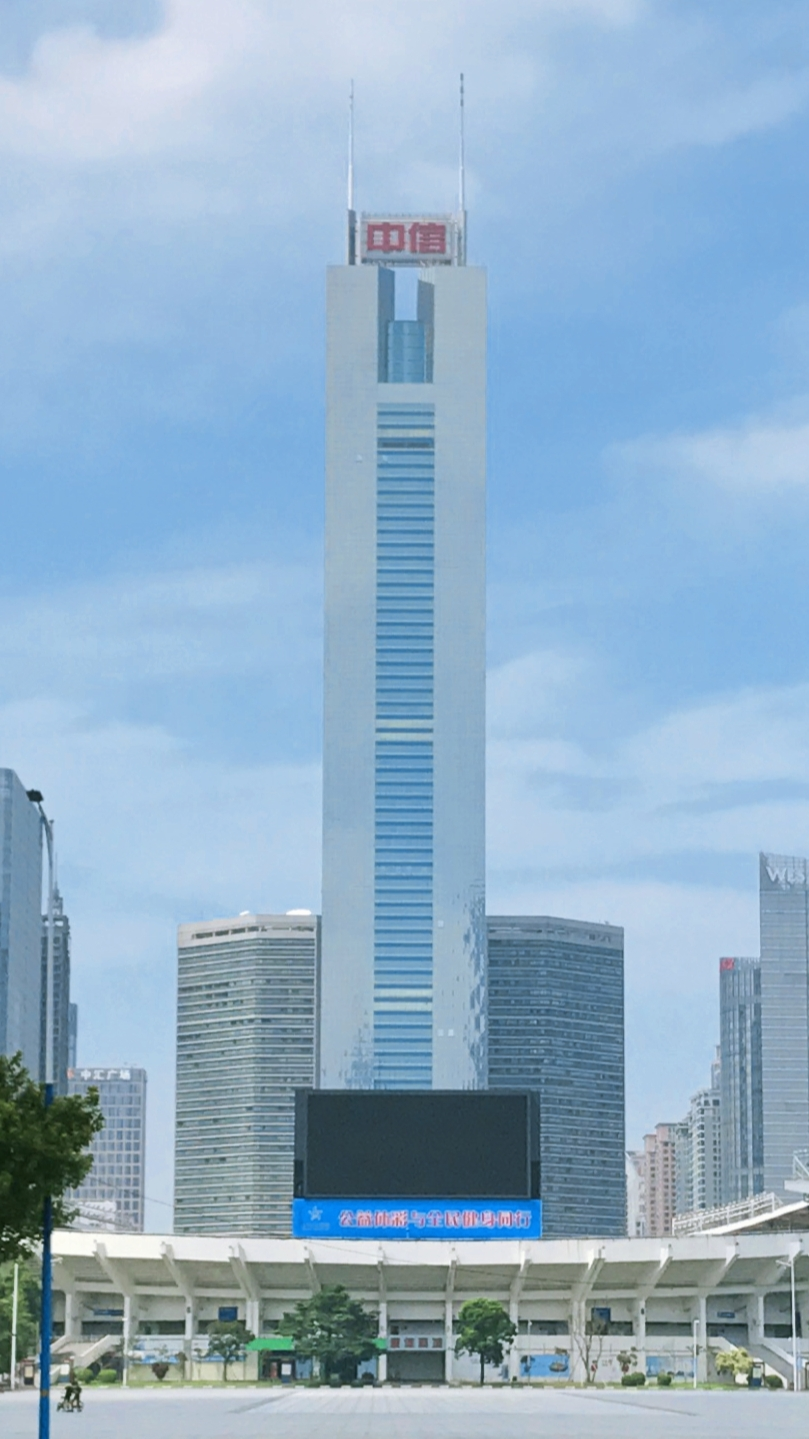
- The CITIC Plaza in 2017
- Interactive map of the CITIC Plaza 中信广场 area
- Alternative names: Sky Central Plaza; China International Trust & Investment Plaza

General information
- Status: Completed
- Type: Commercial offices
- Location: 233 Tianhe N Rd, Tianhe District, Guangzhou, Guangdong, China
- Coordinates: 23°08′40″N 113°19′10″E
- Construction started: 1993; 33 years ago
- Completed: June 1997; 28 years ago

Height
- Architectural: 390.2 m (1,280 ft)
- Roof: 321.9 m (1,056 ft)
- Top floor: 296.9 m (974 ft)

Technical details
- Floor count: 80
- Floor area: 205,239 m^{2} (2,209,174 sq ft)
- Lifts/elevators: 36

Design and construction
- Architects: Dennis Lau & Ng Chun Man Architects & Engineers
- Developer: China International Trust and Investment
- Structural engineer: Maunsell AECOM Group
- Main contractor: Kumagai Gammon Joint Venture; Hong Kong Construction

China International Trust and Investment (CITIC) Plaza (simplified Chinese: 中信广场; traditional Chinese: 中信廣場; pinyin: Zhōngxìn Guǎngchǎng; Jyutping: Zung^{1}seon^{3} Gwong^{2}coeng^{4}) is an 80-storey, 391 m (1,283 ft) office skyscraper in the Tianhe District of Guangzhou, Guangdong, People's Republic of China. Its structural height includes two antenna-like spires on the top. Completed in June 1997, it was the tallest concrete building in the world until the completion of the Trump Tower Chicago, and the tallest in China. As of March 2025, it ranks as the 23rd-tallest building in China, 30th-tallest in Asia, and 45th-tallest worldwide.

Located in the growing and expanding Tianhe District, it is part of a complex of the same name which also consists of two 38-storey residential buildings. Its proximity includes a new train station which serves the extremely busy Guangzhou-Shenzhen and Guangzhou-Hong Kong railways. A new metro station, and the Tianhe Sports Center, where the 6th National Games and parts of the 2010 Asian Games were held. It is on the same Axis as two new building developments in Guangzhou, the first being the East and West Towers in Zhujiang New City and the Pearl Observation tower. It is surrounded by other tall buildings and is a symbol of Guangzhou's growing wealth and importance.

== Tenants ==
All Nippon Airways operated its Guangzhou Office in 2605 CITIC Plaza until May 2, 2011. On May 3, 2011 and since then, it has been in Tower A of Victory Plaza.

== Transportation ==
The building is accessible from Linhe West Station of Guangzhou Metro Line 3 and Zhujiang New Town Automated People Mover System(APM Line).

== Floor list ==
CITIC Plaza elevator service floor list

- No. 1–4 (4 office rooms for 9 / F–17 / F): 1,9–17
- No. 5–8 (4 from 18 / F–26 / F office elevator): 1,18–26
- No. 9–12 (office space of 4/28 / F–37 / F): 1,28,30–37
- No. 13–16 (office space of 4/38 / F–46 / F): 1,38–46
- No. 17–20 (4 from 48 / F–58 / F office elevator): 48,50–58
- No. 21–24 (office space of 4/59 / F–66 / F): 48,59–66
- No. 25–28 (4 from the 68 / F–75 / F office elevator): 48,68,71–75
- No. 29–34 (6 shuttle lanes to and from the air lobby): 1,48
- No. 35 (fire and cargo lift): B1, 1, 6–27, 27A, 28, 30–47, 47A, 48, 50–66, 67A, 67B, 68, 71–75
- No. 36 (fire and cargo elevators): B1, 1, 6–27, 27A, 28, 30–47, 47A, 48, 50–66, 67A, 67B, 68, 71–78
- P6–P7 (parking lot dedicated elevator): B2, B1,1,6

== Gallery ==
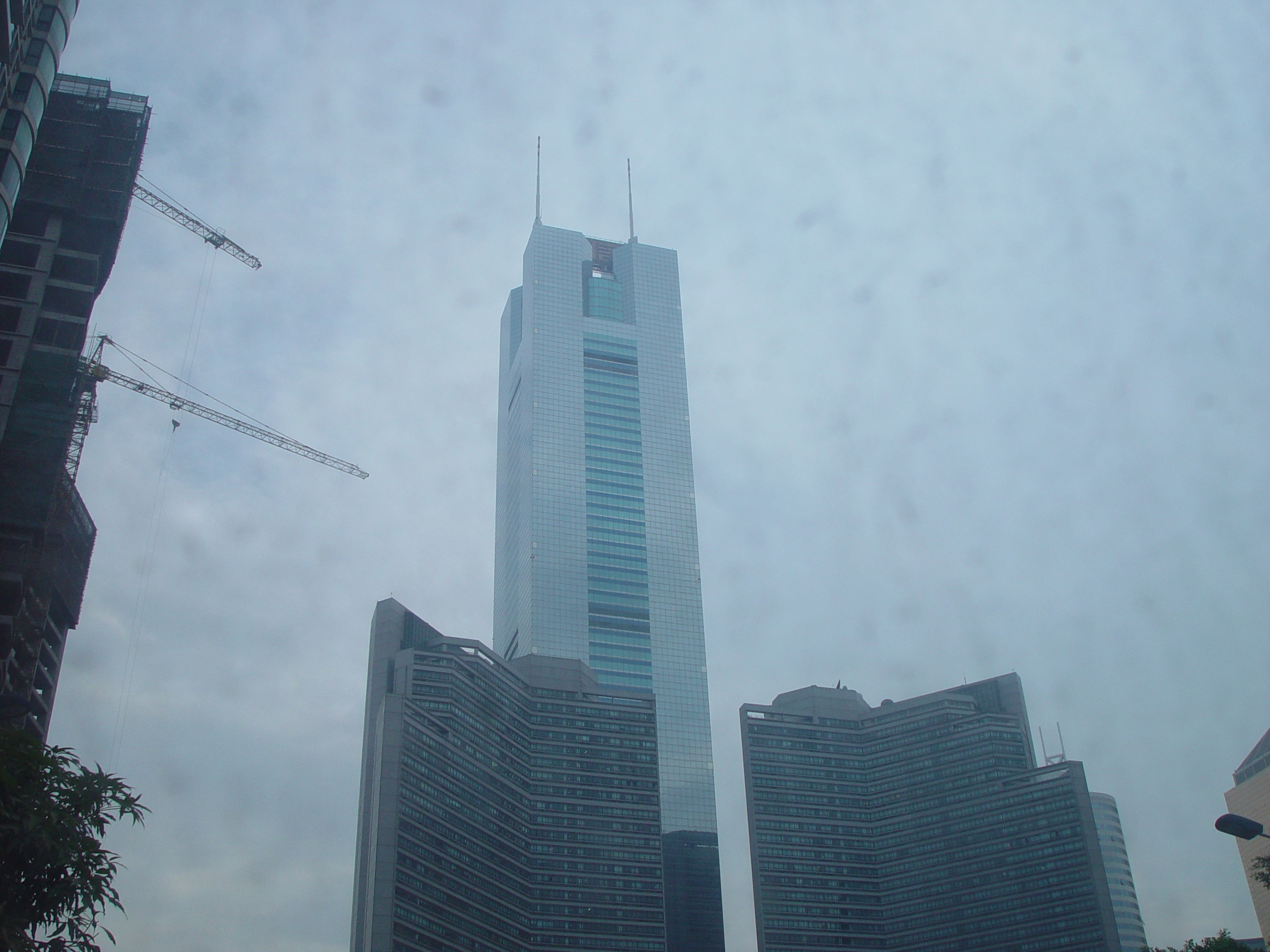
From a distance

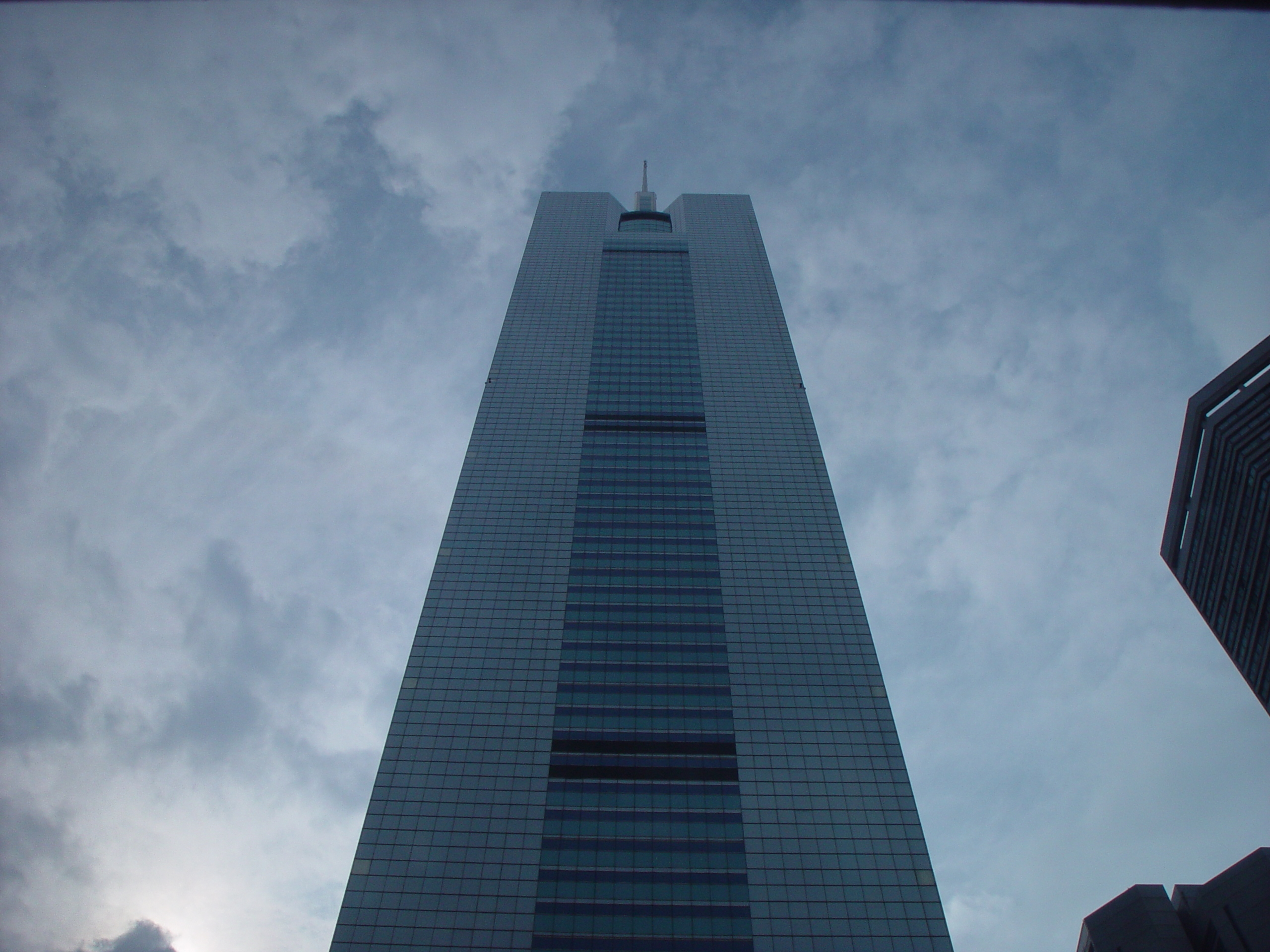
Looking up

== See also ==
- List of skyscrapers
- List of tallest freestanding structures in the world
- List of tallest buildings in Guangzhou
- CITIC Group
