= China International Center =

Skyscraper in Guangzhou, Guangdong, China

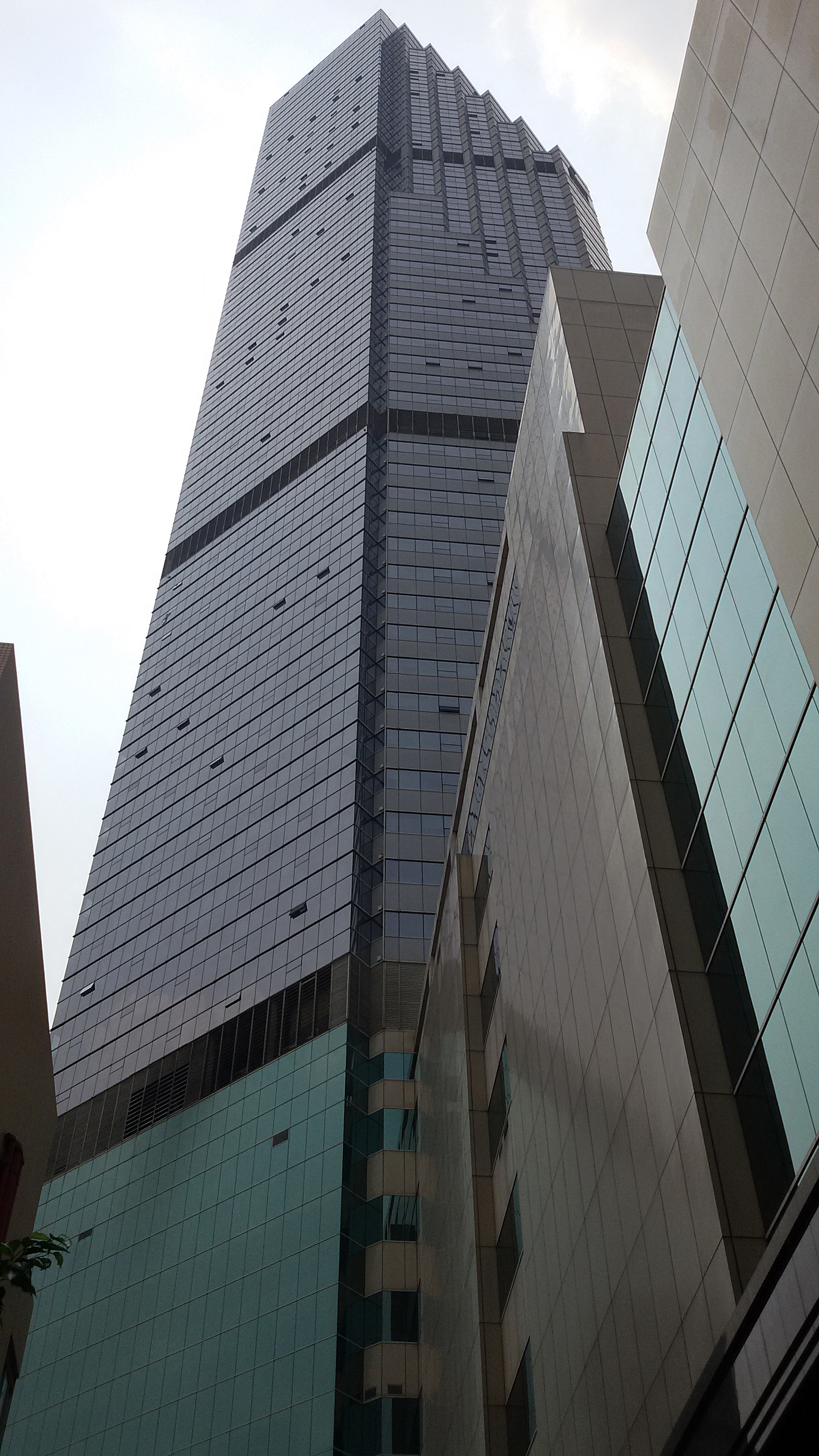
- China International Center
- Interactive map of the China International Center area
- Alternative names: Guangzhou International Trade Plaza; China Plaza

General information
- Status: Completed
- Type: Commercial offices
- Architectural style: Modernism
- Location: 33 Zhongshan 3 Road; Guangzhou, China
- Coordinates: 23.12788°N 113.2767°E
- Construction started: 2003
- Completed: 2007

Height
- Roof: 270 m (890 ft)

Technical details
- Floor count: 62
- Floor area: 293,126 m^{2} (3,155,180 sq ft)

China International Center (simplified Chinese: 中华国际中心; traditional Chinese: 中華國際中心; pinyin: Zhōnghuá Guójì Zhōngxīn) is a 62-storey, 270 m (890 ft) skyscraper completed in 2007 in Guangzhou, China.

== See also ==
- List of tallest buildings in the world
