= Post & Telecommunication Hub =

- 广东电信广场
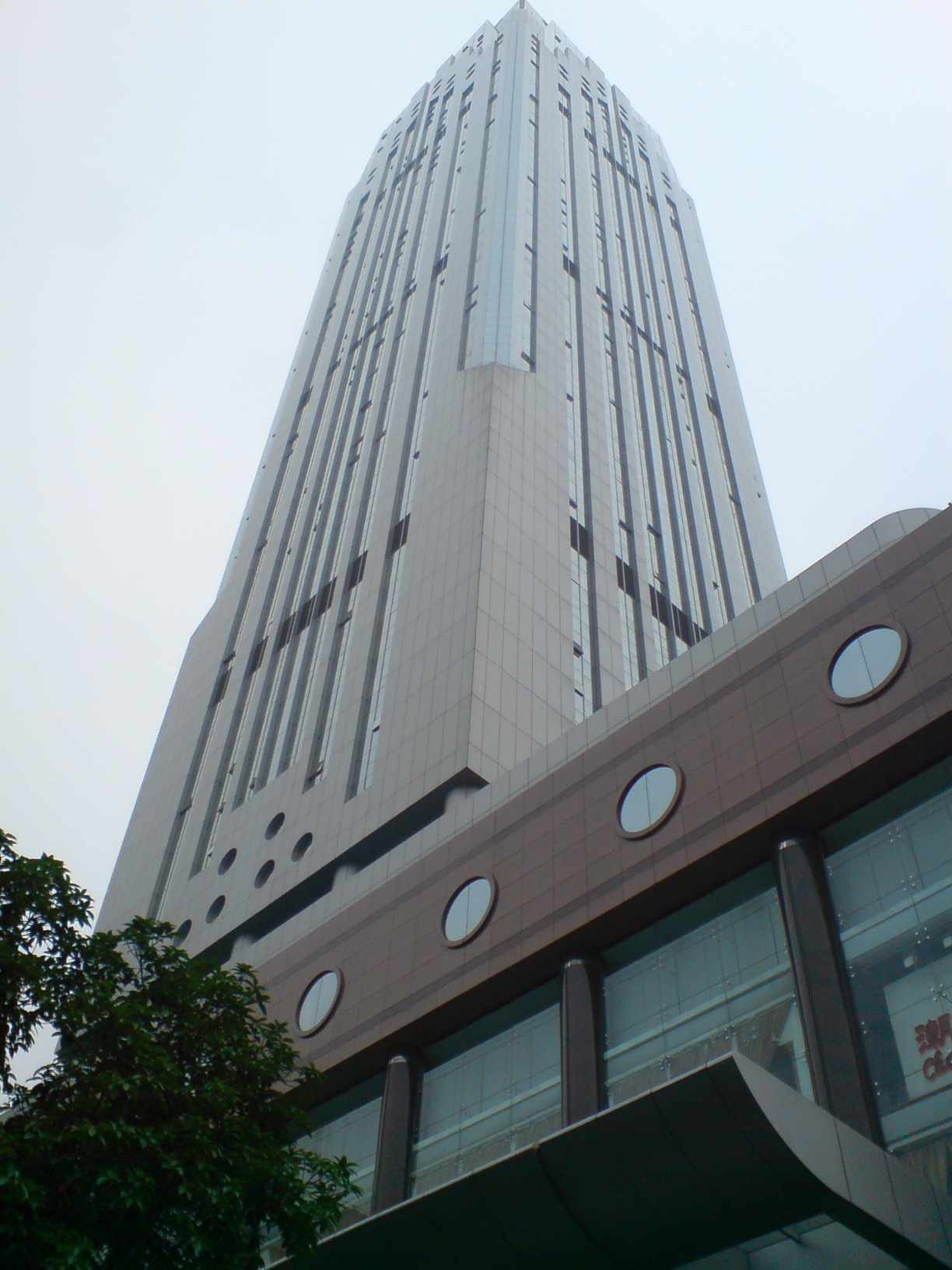
- Interactive map of the Post & Telecommunication Hub area
- Alternative names: P&T Centre; Guangdong Telecom Plaza

General information
- Status: Completed
- Type: Commercial offices
- Architectural style: Modernism
- Location: 18 Zhongshan Road 2nd, Yuexiu District; Guangzhou, China
- Coordinates: 23.12730°N 113.288639°E
- Construction started: 1997
- Completed: 2003

Height
- Roof: 260 m (850 ft)

Technical details
- Floor count: 68; 6 below ground
- Floor area: 145,000 m^{2} (1,560,000 sq ft)

Post & Telecommunication Hub (also known as Guangdong Telecom Plaza) is a 68-storey, 260 m (850 ft) skyscraper in Guangzhou, China. The building was completed in 2003.

== See also ==
- List of skyscrapers
