= South China Normal University station =

Guangzhou Metro Line 3 and Line 11 station

South China Normal University 华师
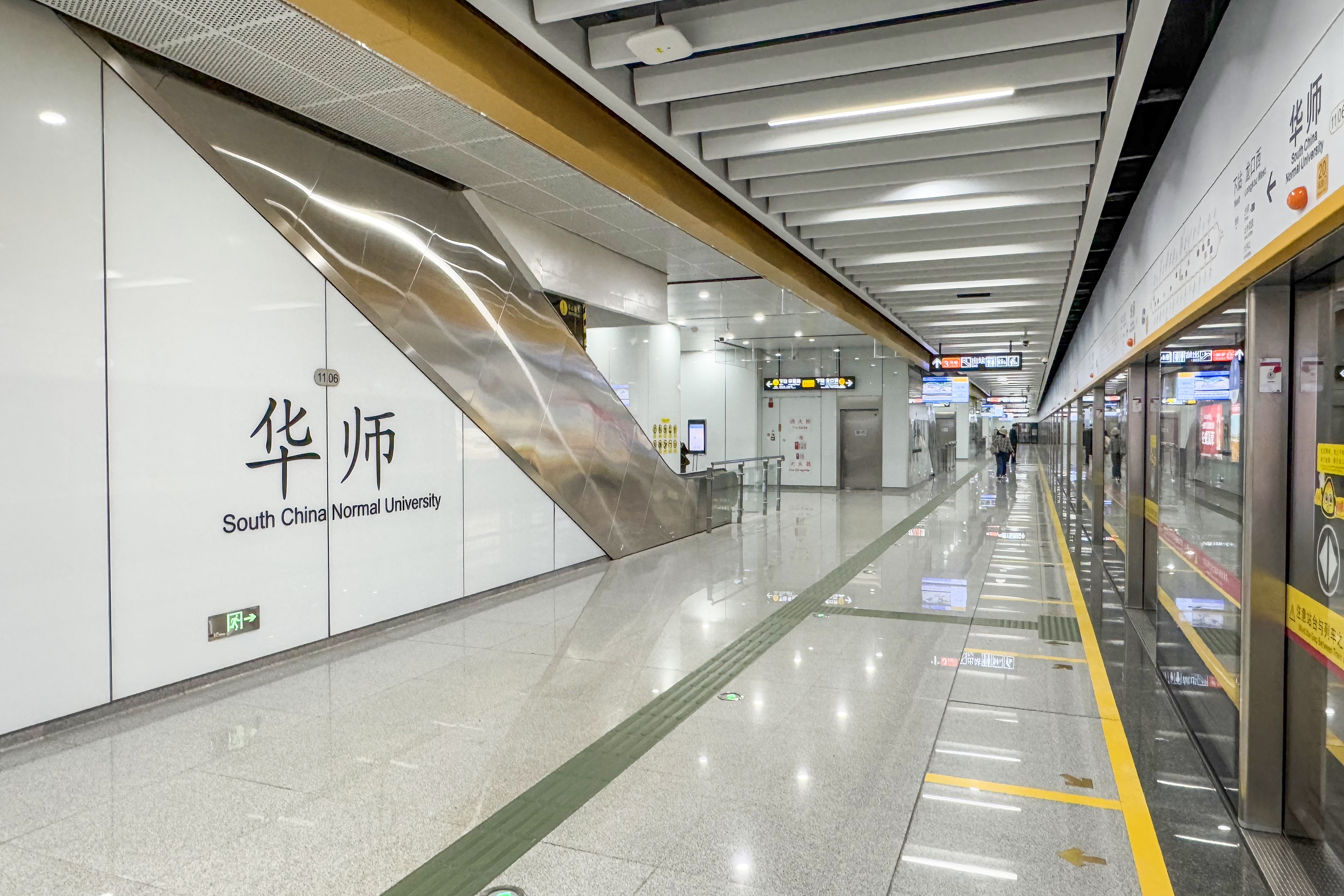
- Line 11 platform 3 (Outer Circle platform)

Chinese name
- Simplified Chinese: 华师站
- Traditional Chinese: 華師站
Transcriptions
Standard Mandarin
- Hanyu Pinyin: Huáshī Zhàn
Yue: Cantonese
- Yale Romanization: Wàhsī Jaahm
- Jyutping: Waa^{4}si^{1} Zaam^{6}

General information
- Location: Wushan Road (五山路) between Tianhe North Road (天河北路) and Tianke Road (天科路), Shipai Subdistrict; Tianhe District, Guangzhou, Guangdong; China
- Coordinates: 23°8′35.27″N 113°20′24.20″E
- Operator: Guangzhou Metro Co. Ltd.
- Lines: Line 3 (Future: Line 10); Line 11
- Platforms: 4 (1 island platform and 1 split island platform)
- Tracks: 4

Construction
- Structure type: Underground
- Accessible: Yes

Other information
- Station code: 314 1106

History
- Opened: Line 3: 30 December 2006 (19 years ago); Line 11: 28 December 2024 (19 months ago)

Services
Preceding station	Guangzhou Metro	Following station
Gangding towards Haibang	Line 3	Wushan towards Tianhe Coach Terminal
Longkou West Outer Circle	Line 11	Huajing Road Inner Circle
Future services
Gangding towards Xilang	Line 10	Wushan towards Tianhe Coach Terminal
Location

South China Normal University station or Huashi station (simplified Chinese: 华师站; traditional Chinese: 華師站; Jyutping: waa^{4} si^{1} zaam^{6}; Cantonese Yale: Wàhsī Jaahm) is an interchange station between Line 3 and Line 11 of the Guangzhou Metro. The Line 3 station started operations on 30 December 2006, and the Line 11 station started operations on 28 December 2024. It is located underground at the junction of Tianhe Road North and Wushan Road in Tianhe District. Its name is derived from the nearby South China Normal University (华南师范大学; 華南師範大學; Wàhnàahm Sīfaahn Daaihhohk).

== Station layout ==
=== Line 3 ===
G	-	Exits B, E
L1; Concourse	Lobby	Ticket Machines, Customer Service, Shops, Police Station, Security Facilities, transfer to Line 11
L2; Platforms	Platform 1	3 towards Haibang (Gangding)
L2; Platforms	Island Platform, doors will open on the left
L2; Platforms	Platform 2	3 towards Tianhe Coach Terminal (Wushan)

=== Line 11 ===
G	-	Exits C, D, F
L1; Concourse	West lobby	Ticket Machines, Customer Service, Shops, Police Station, Security Facilities
L1; Concourse	Transfer passageways	Transfer passageway between west and east lobbies and Line 3
L1; Concourse	East lobby	Ticket Machines, Customer Service, Shops, Police Station, Safety Facilities, transfer to Line 3
L2	-	Station equipment
L3	Mezzanine	Mezzanine between west lobby and platforms, station equipment
L4; Platforms	Platform 3	11 Outer Circle (Longkou West)
L4; Platforms	Split-island Platform, doors will open on the left
L4; Platforms		Toilets, Nursery, Passageway between platforms
L4; Platforms	Split-island Platform, doors will open on the left
L4; Platforms	Platform 4	11 Inner Circle (Huajing Road)

=== Entrances/exits ===
At the beginning of the station's opening, there were two exits, which were Exits C and E, whilst Exits B and D were opened a few years later. Exit D was later demolished in 2019 to facilitate the construction of Line 11, and Exit C was closed on 23 December 2023 for the same reason. After the Line 11 station was put into use, a new Exit F were added, and Exits C and D, now connected to the Line 11 concourse, were reopened at the same time. In addition, Exit A of this station is a reserved entrance, which is located on the northwest side of the junction of Wushan Road intersection of Tianhe Road North. The exit has been delayed for many years due to land use and other issues, and construction will start near one end of the station in 2020. However, at present, it is still affected by the co-ordination of land use and does not meet the conditions for continuation of construction.

==== Line 3 concourse ====
- B: Tianhe North Road
- E: Wushan Road, South China Normal University, Guangzhou Youth League School, The Affiliated High School of South China Normal University

==== Line 11 west concourse ====
- C: Tianke Road, The Affiliated High School of South China Normal University
- F: Tianke Road

==== Line 11 east concourse ====
- D: Wushan Road, South China Normal University, Guangzhou Youth League School

Exit B is equipped with a stairlift, and Exit D is equipped with an elevator.

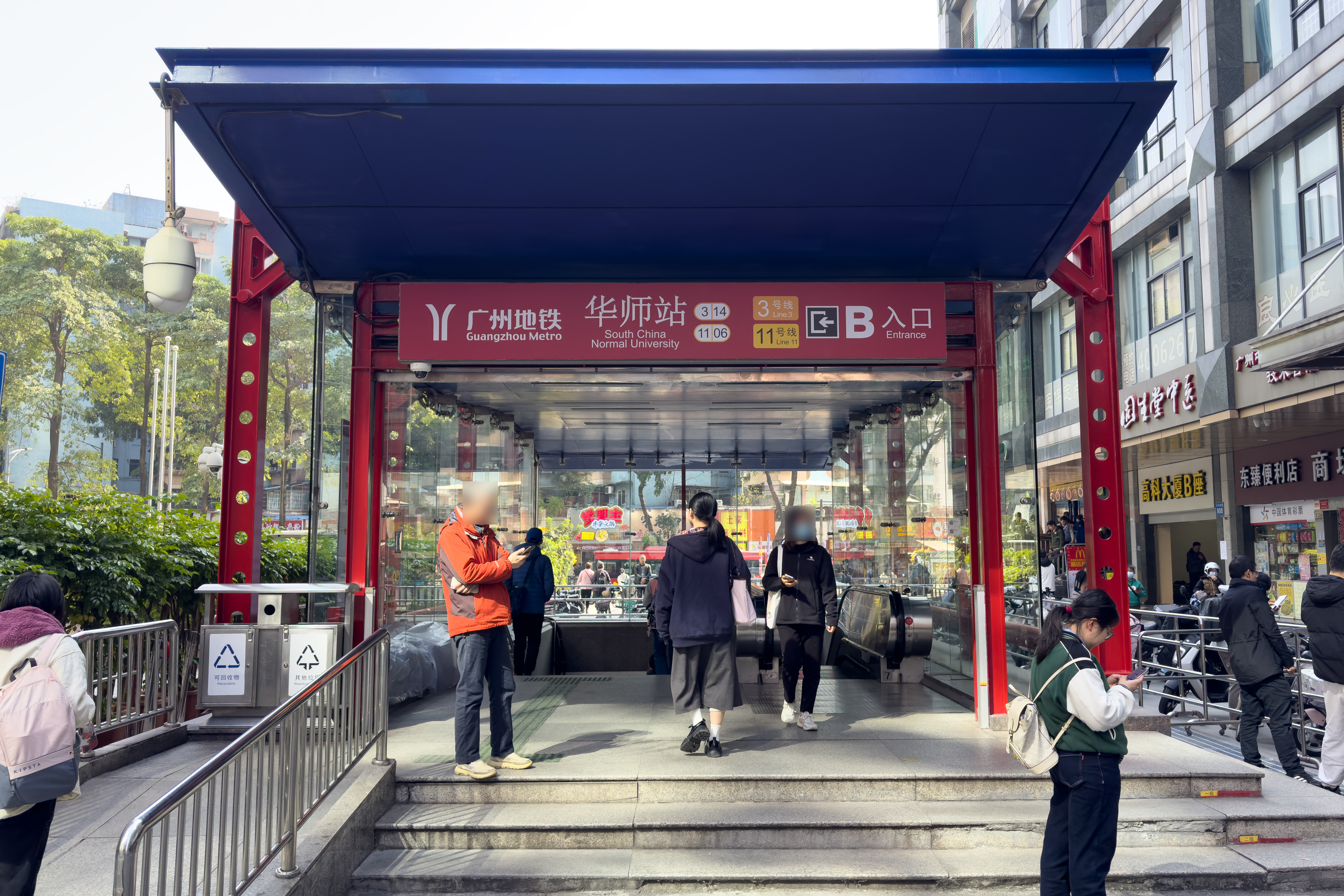
Entrance B

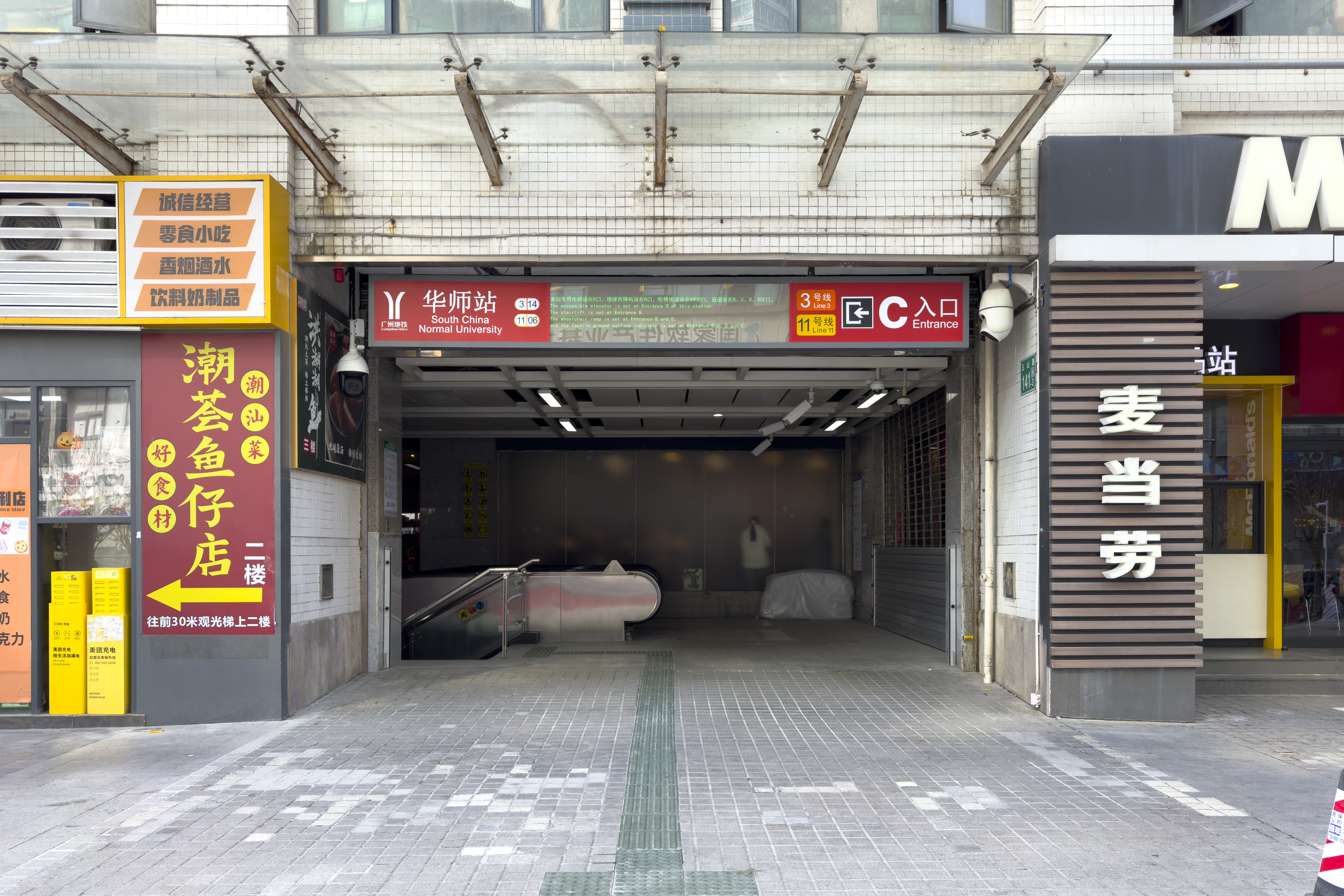
Entrance C

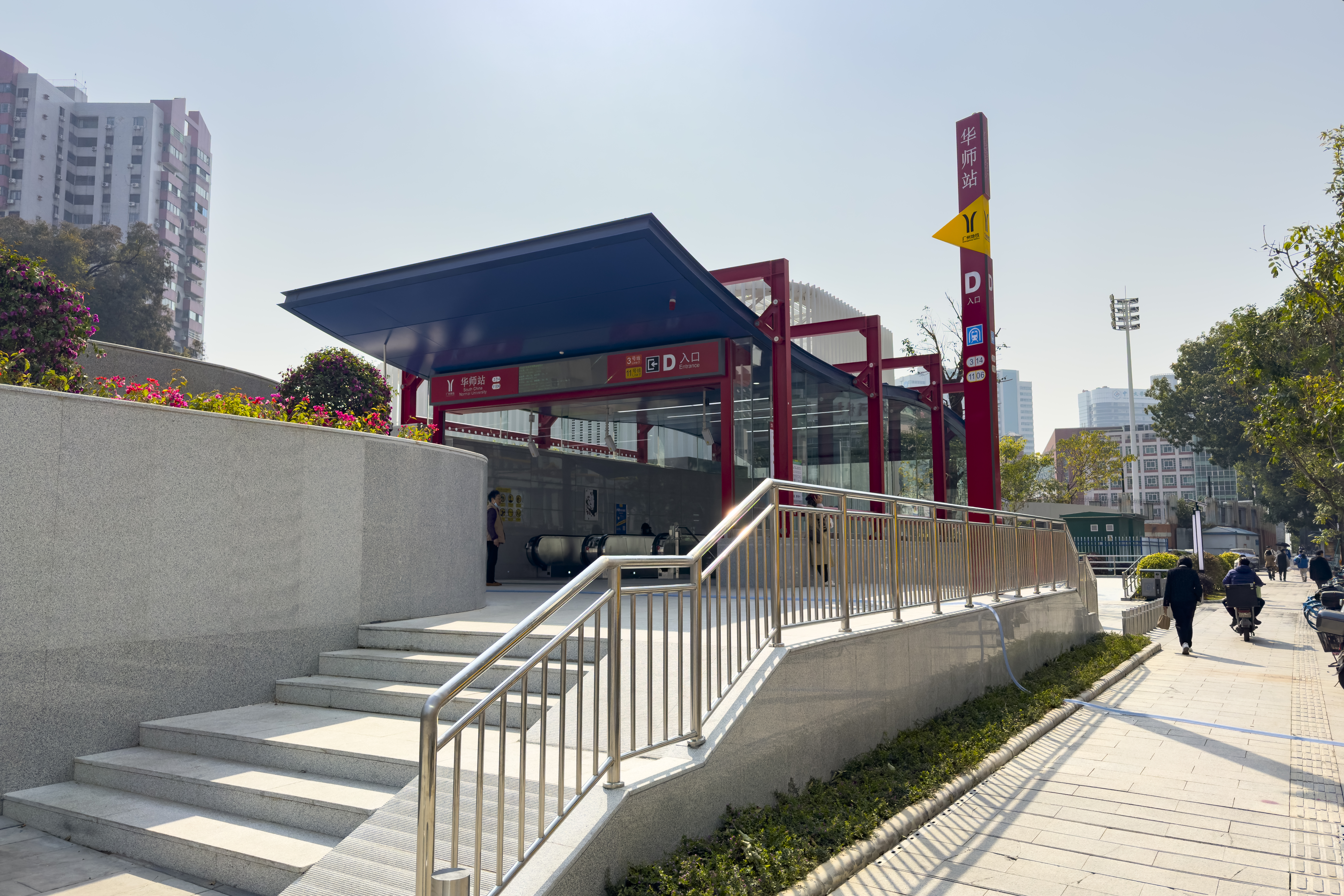
Entrance D

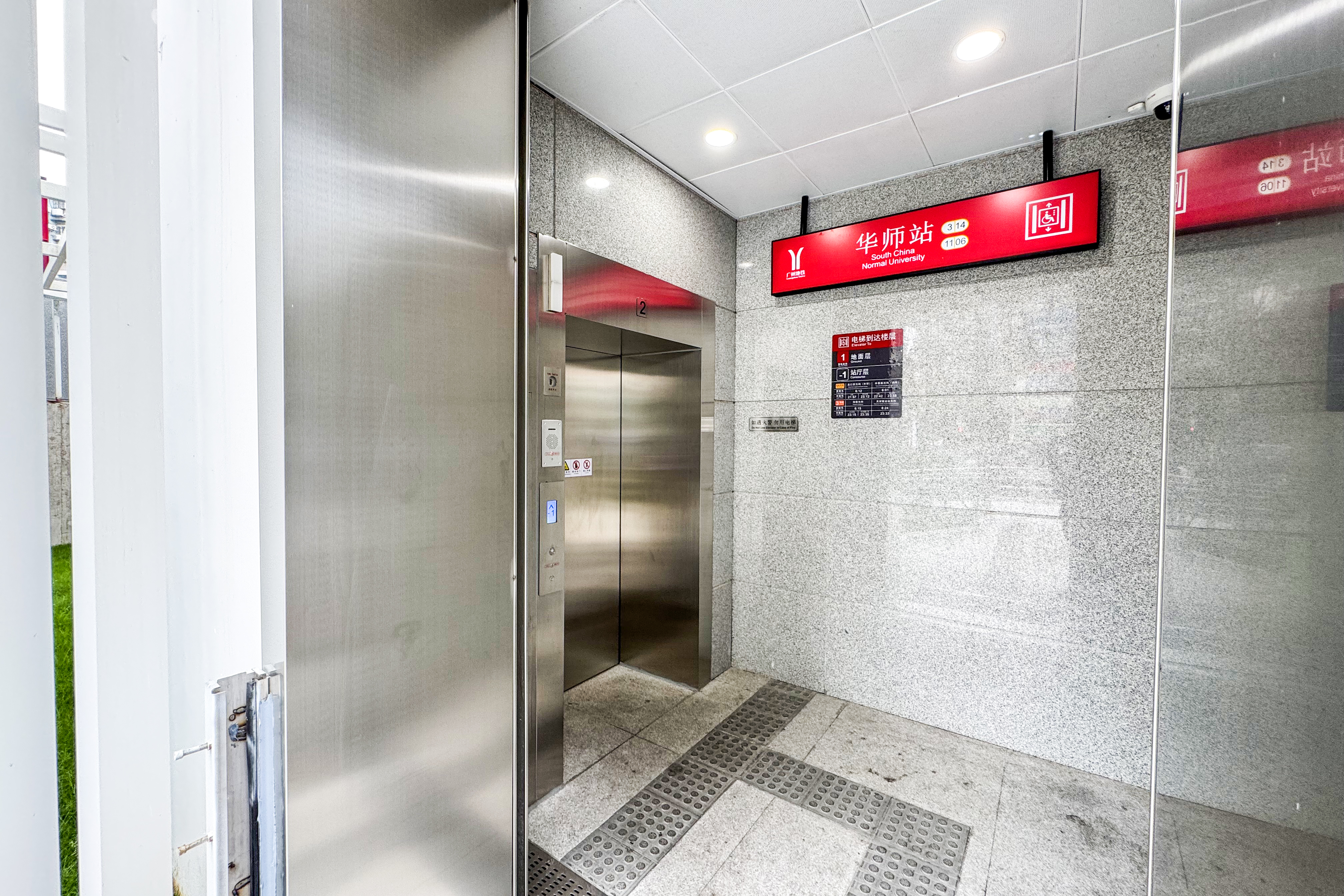
Elevator of Entrance D

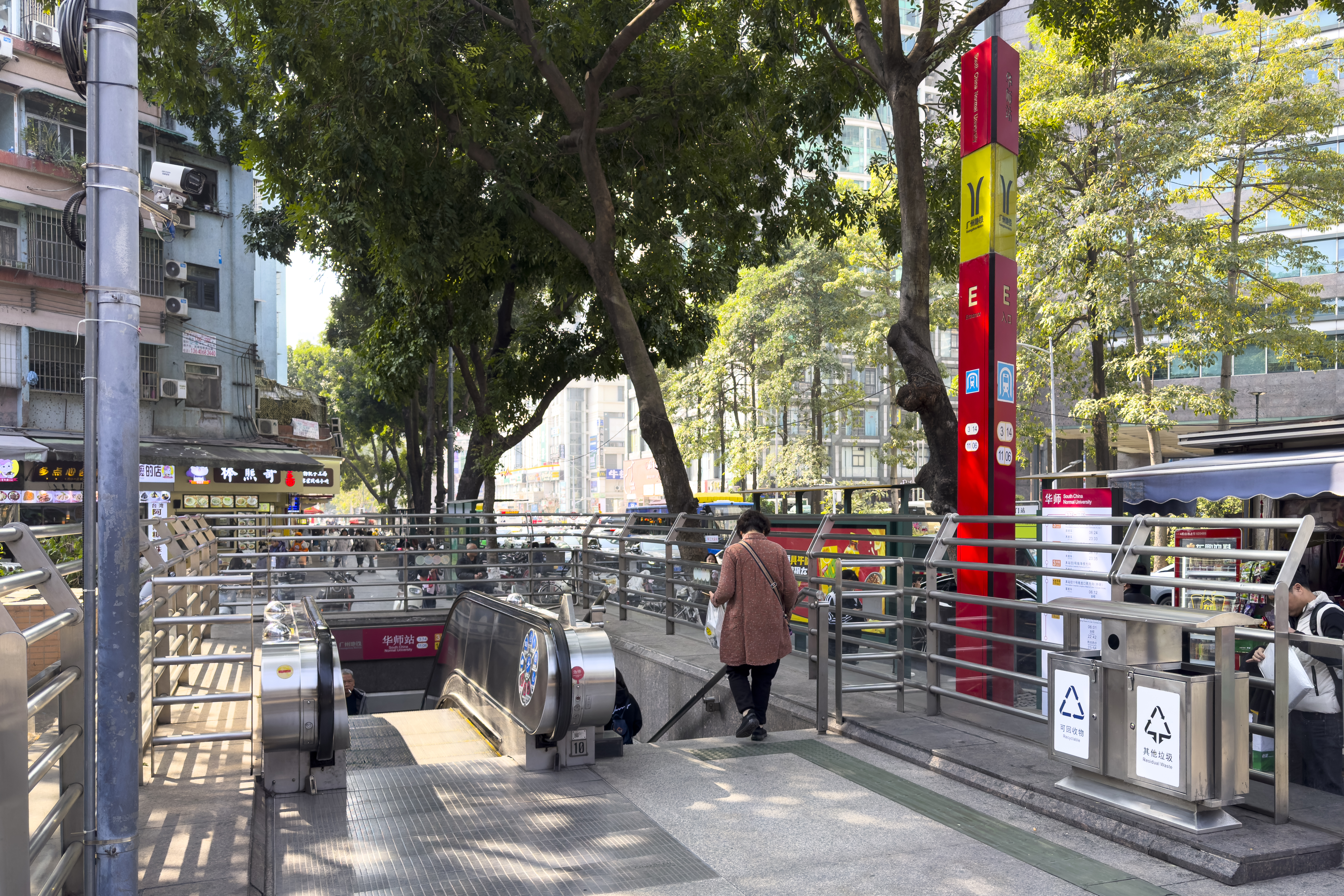
Entrance E

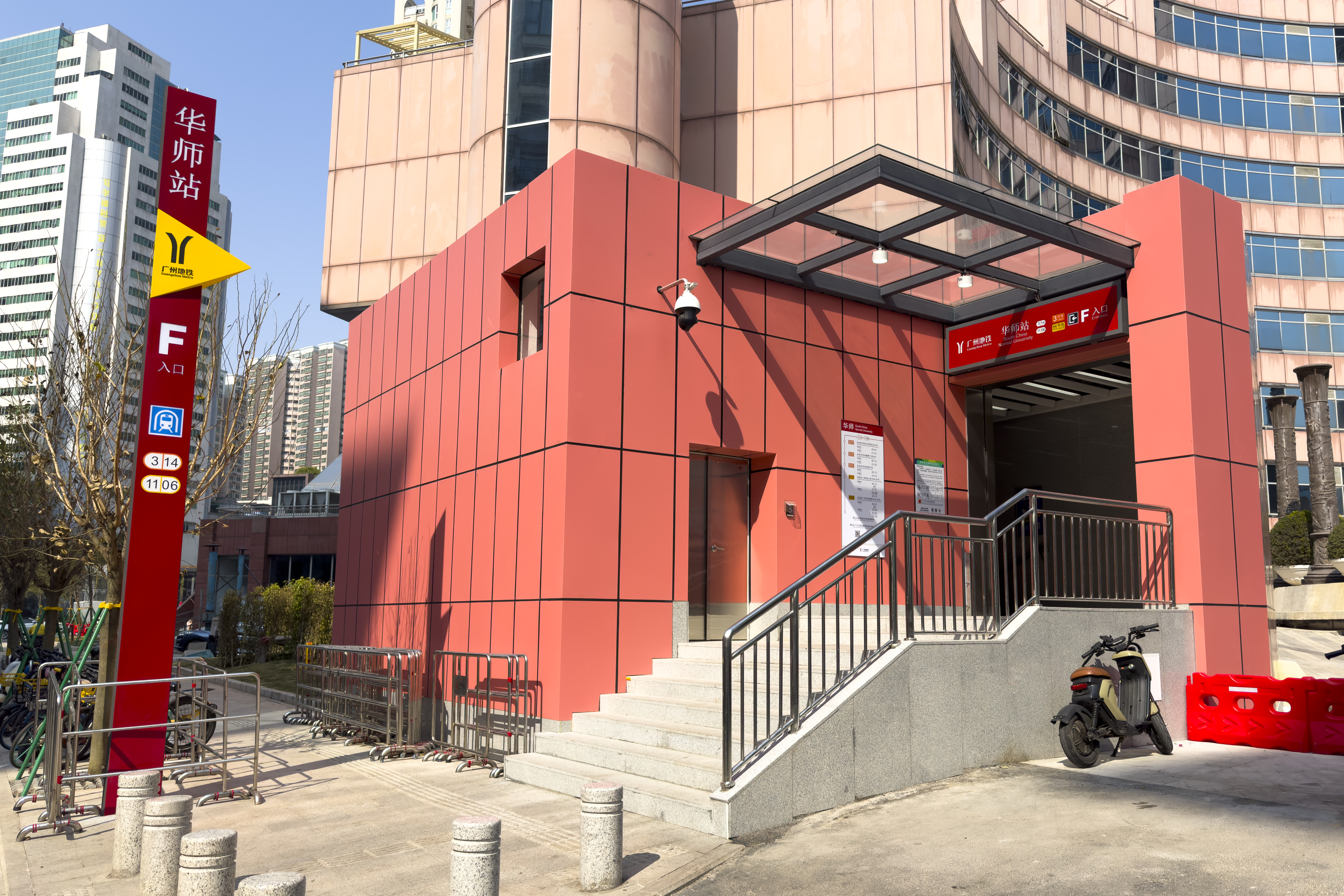
Entrance F

== Gallery ==
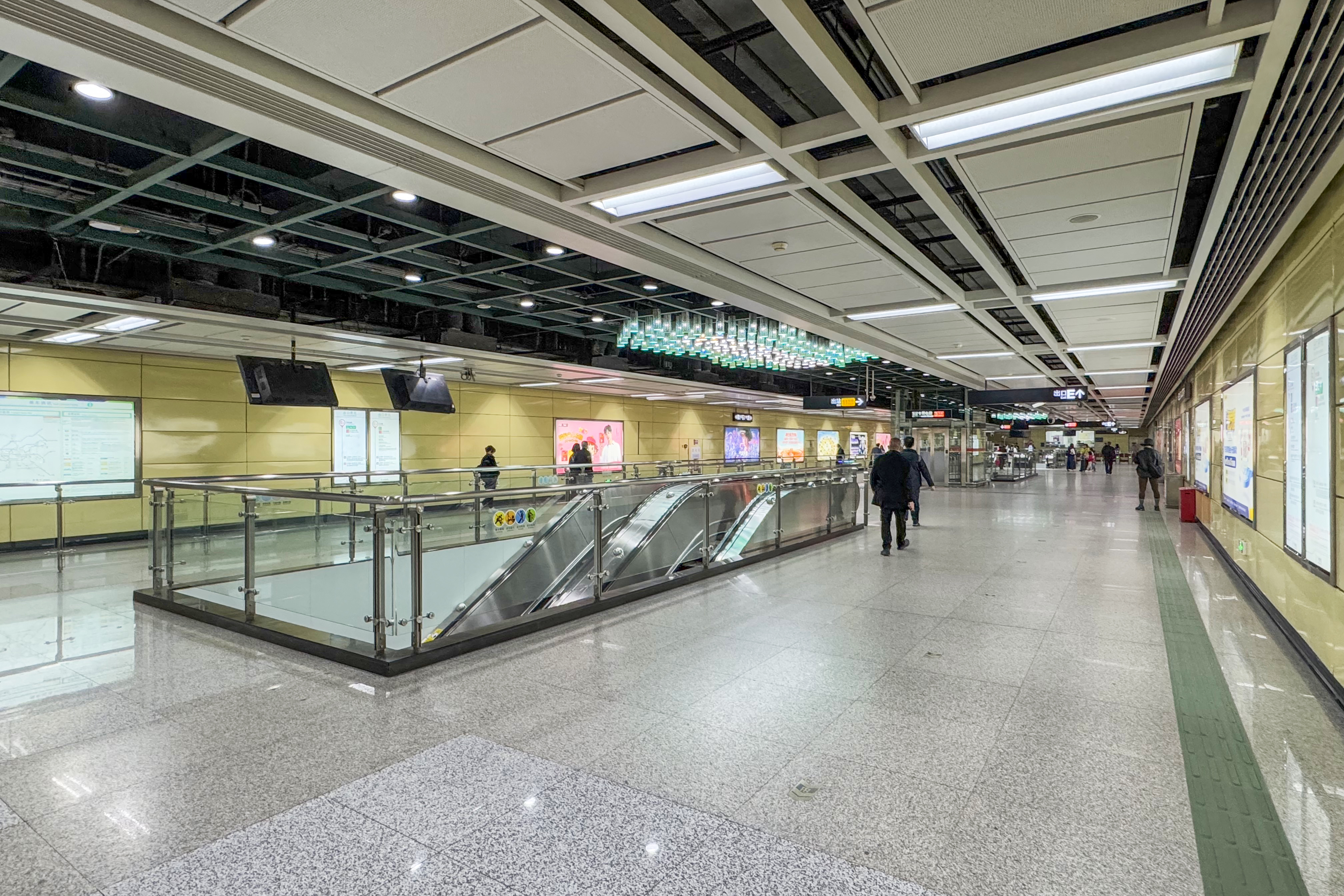
Line 3 concourse

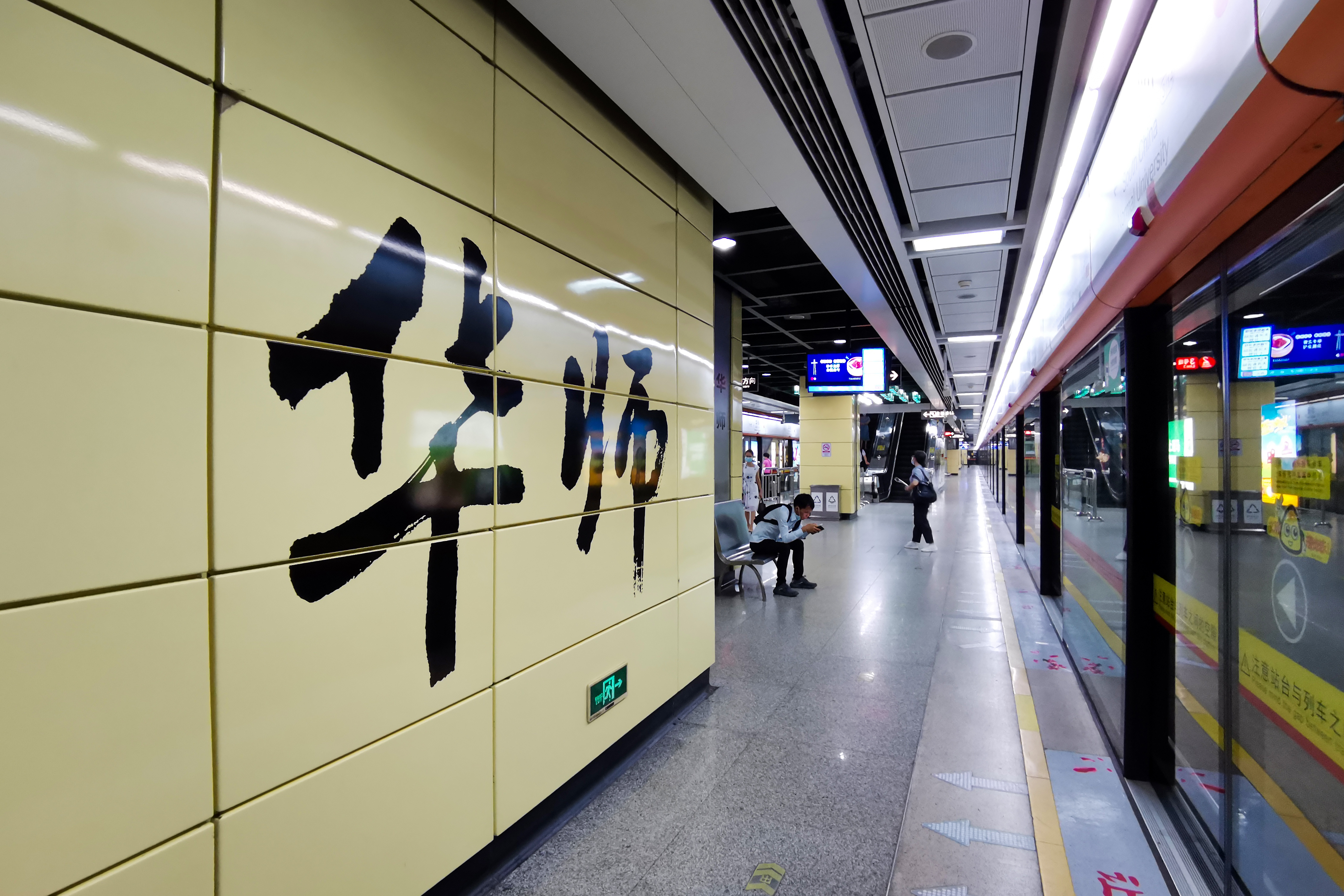
Line 3 platform

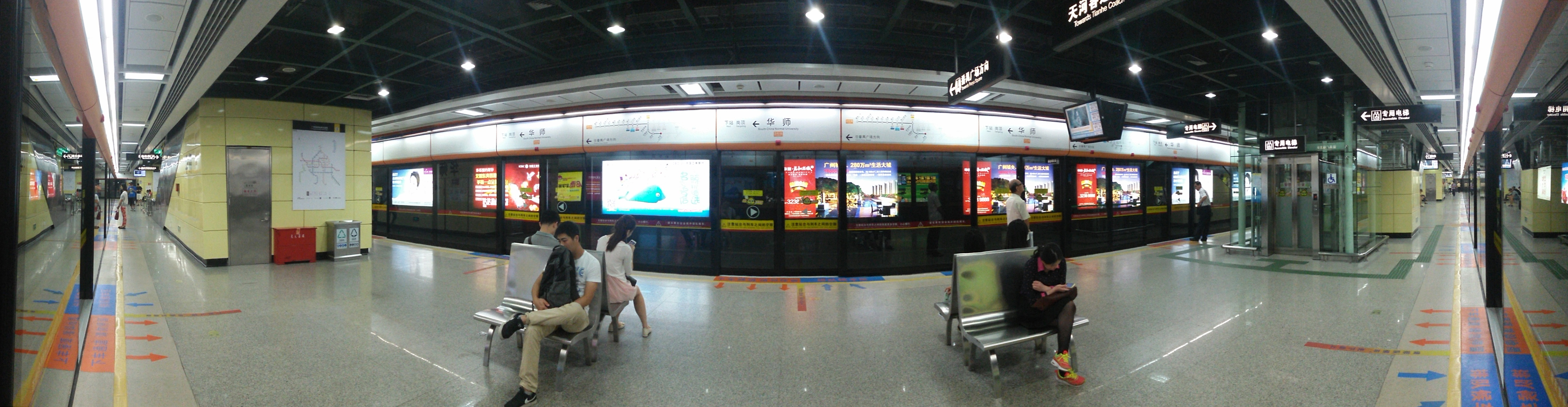
Line 3 platform 2 panorama

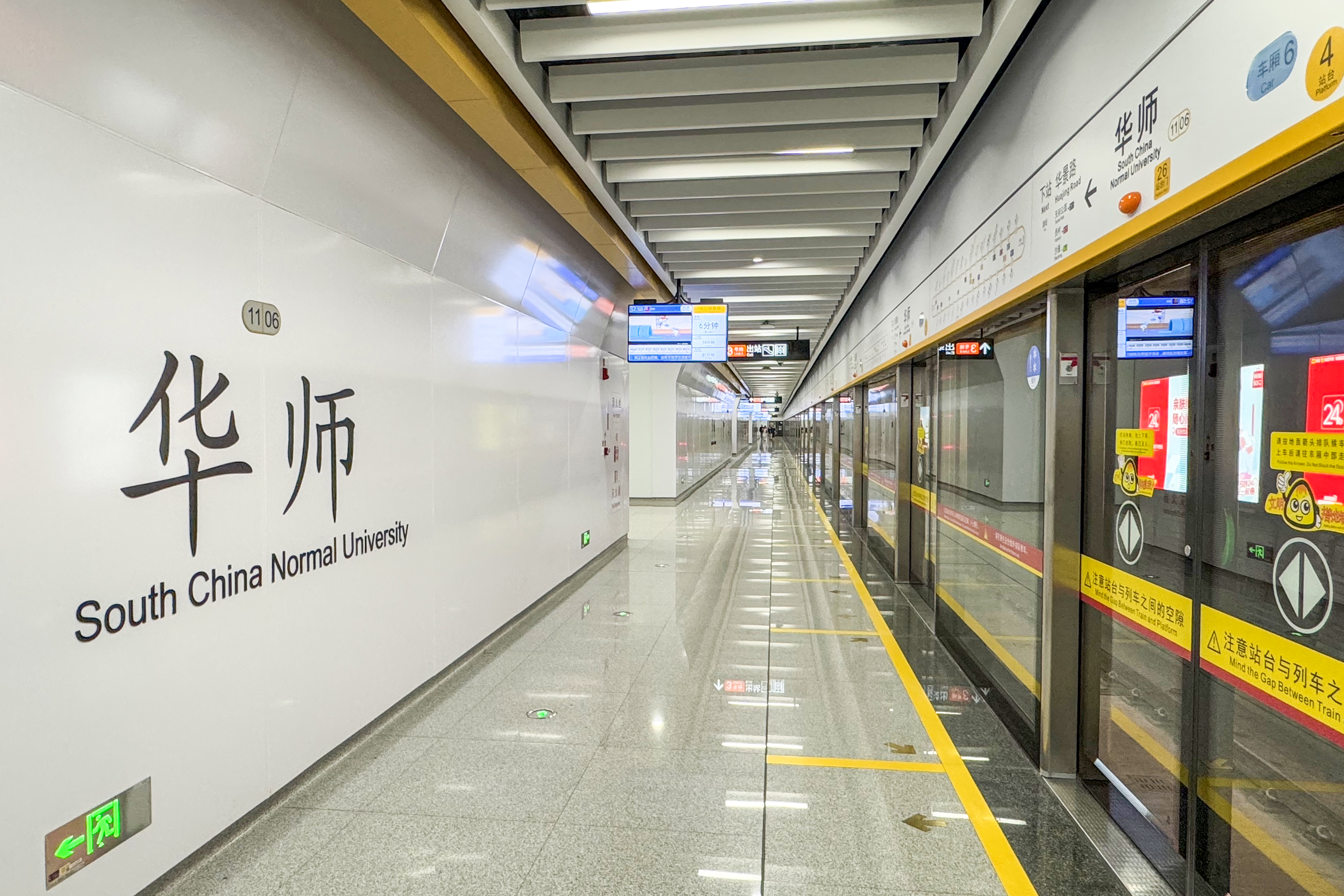
Line 11 platform 4

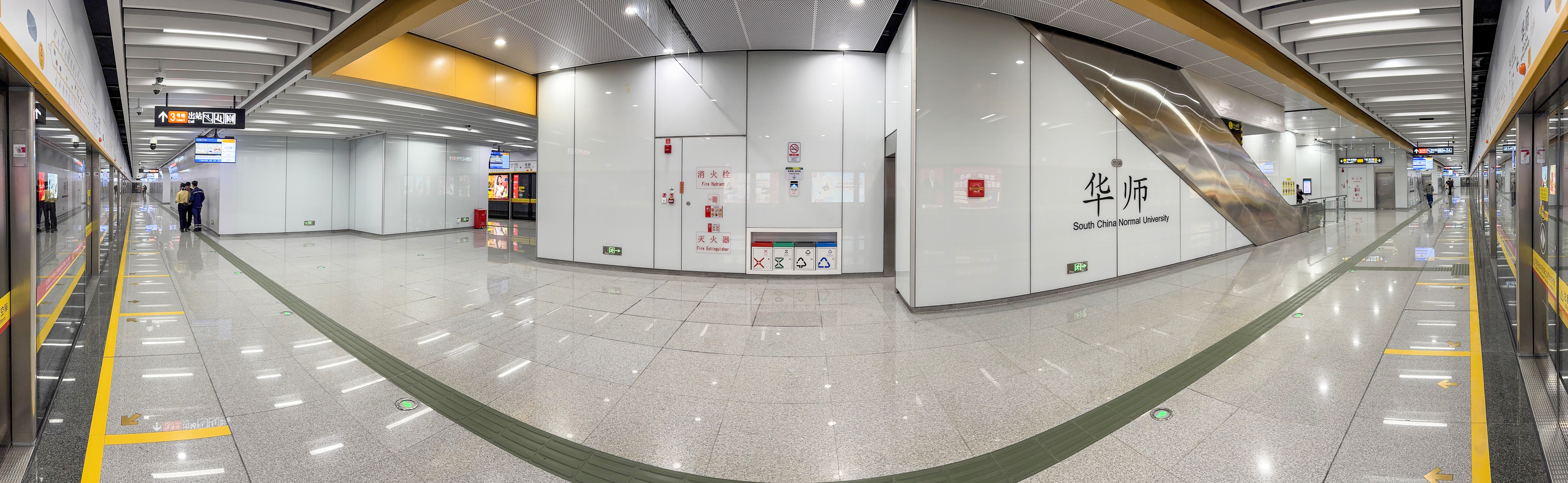
Line 11 platform 3 panorama

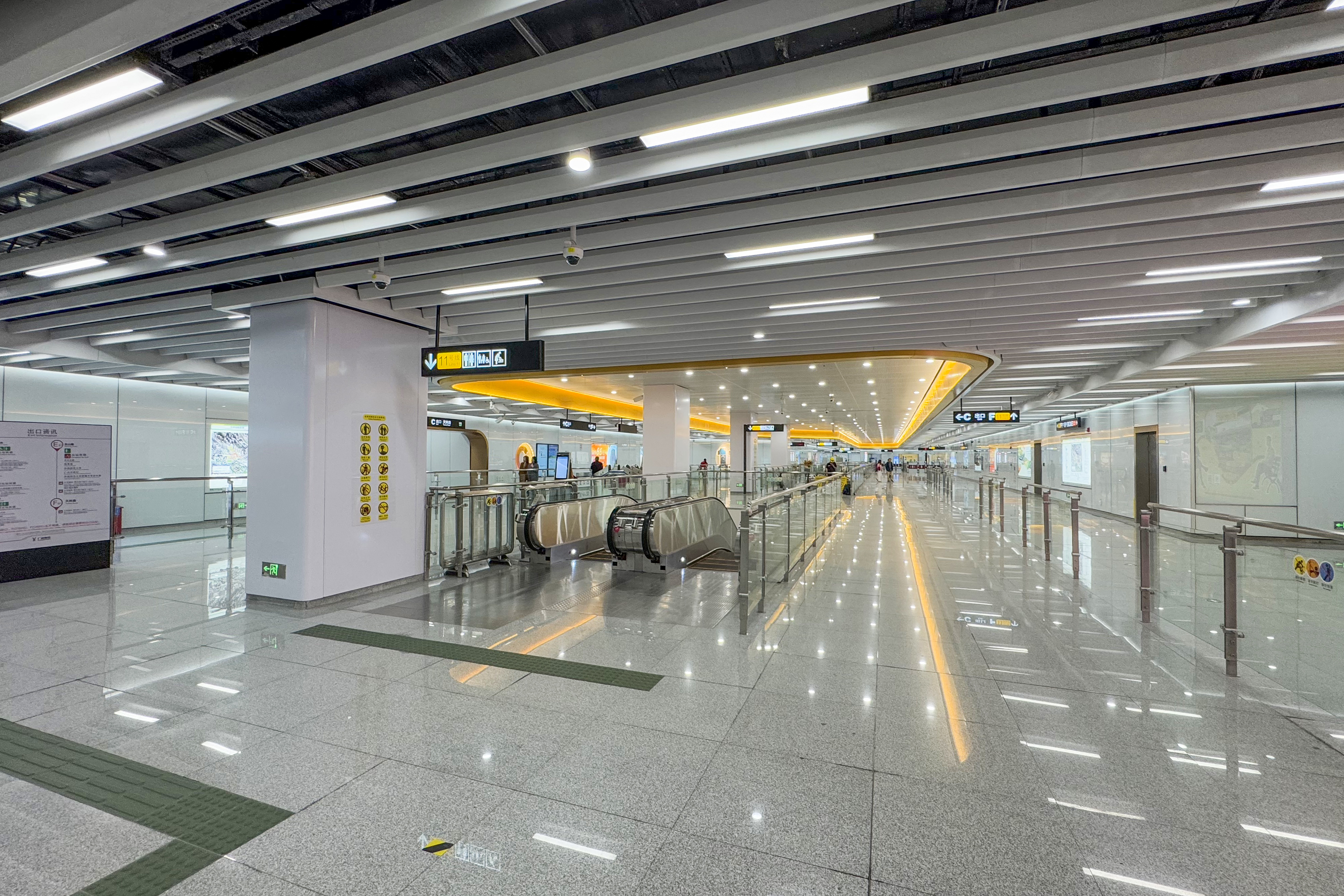
Line 11 west concourse

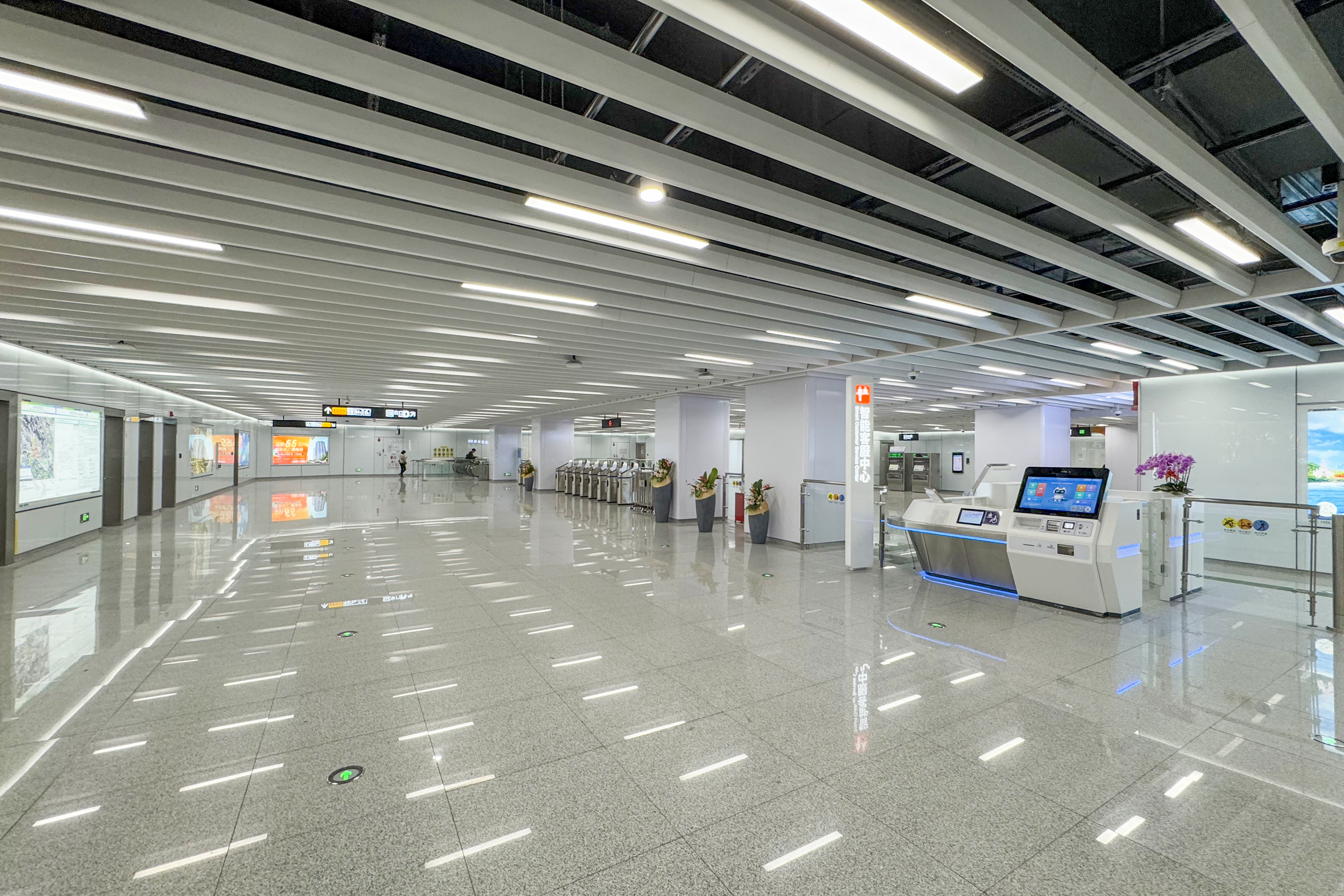
Line 11 east concourse

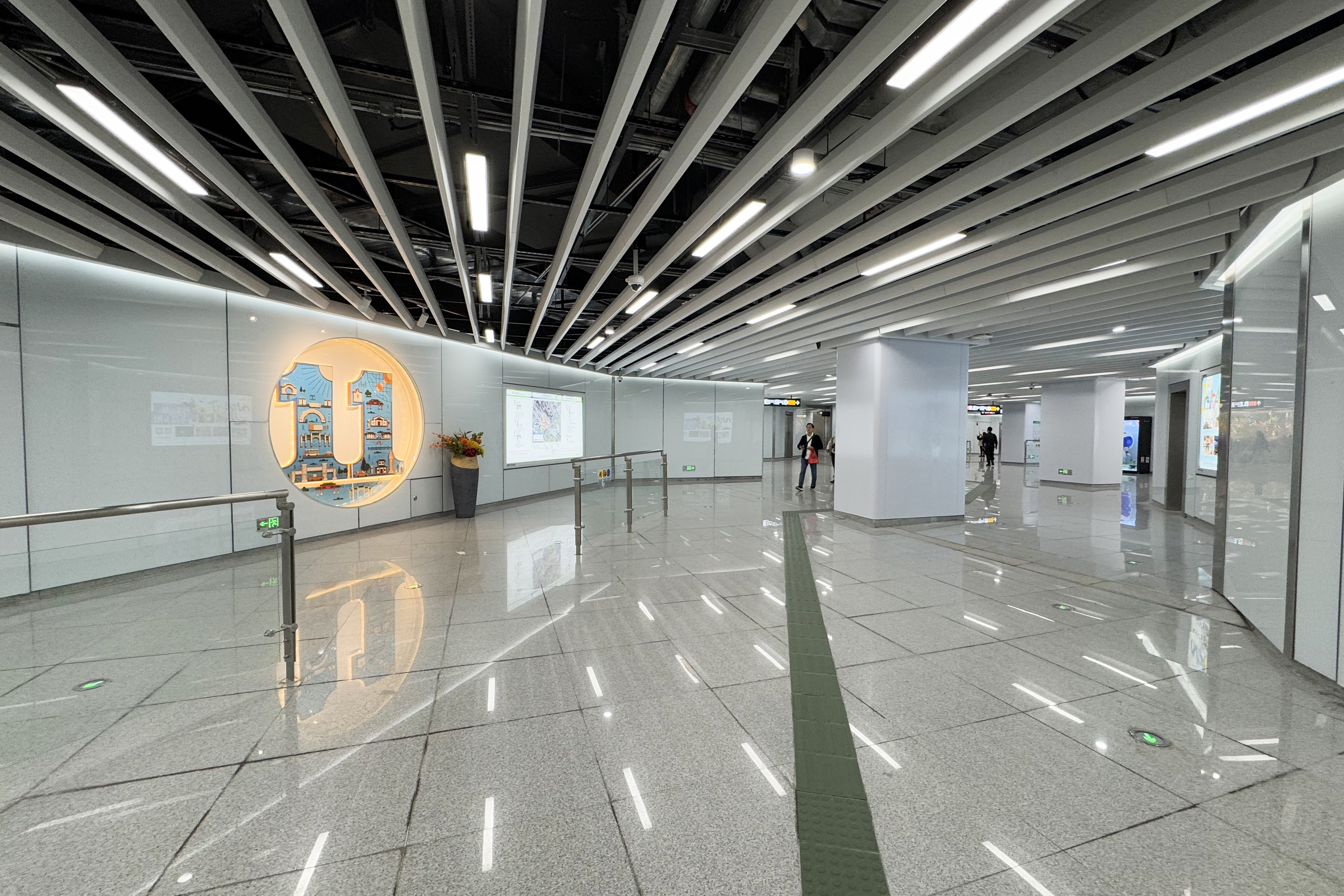
Transfer passageway between lines 3 & 11

== History ==
South China Normal University Station first appeared in the "2000 Recent Line Network Planning Implementation Adjustment Plan". In response to the development of the Shipai area, an additional station on the Line 3 branch was added, and the location has been comparable to the present. The station was originally named Tianhe Beilu station, but was officially named South China Normal University Station based on the nearby South China Normal University. In the 2003 rail network plan, the then Line 14 had an interchange with the Line 3 branch at a section of Tianhe Road North through this station. Later, in the 2008 planning plan, it was changed to a circular line (Line 8), which was added at that time to pass through this station. Finally, in 2010, the circular line became the current Line 11, which still had an interchange with Line 3 branch at this station.

The main structure of the Line 3 station was topped out on 20 April 2005 and it was officially put into use on 30 December 2006.

On 23 August 2018, the Line 11 station completed traffic diversion and entered the enclosure construction stage. In November 2022, the double-line underground excavation platform tunnel broke through. On 9 December 2023, part of the Line 3 concourse began to be enclosed and renovated to cooperate with the access project of the Line 11 concourse. On 20 September 2024, the Line 11 station completed the "three rights" transfer.

On 28 December 2024, Line 11 began operations, and the station became an interchange station.

== Future development ==
=== Line 10 ===
In the future, the Line 3 branch section (Tianhe Coach Terminal - Tiyu Xilu) will be dismantled from Line 3 and extended to the southwest and connect with Line 10 for independent operation to Xilang. After completion, the station will be converted into a Line 10 station and will no longer belong to Line 3.

== See other ==
- South China Normal University
