= Huajing Road station =

Guangzhou Metro Line 11 station

Huajing Road 华景路
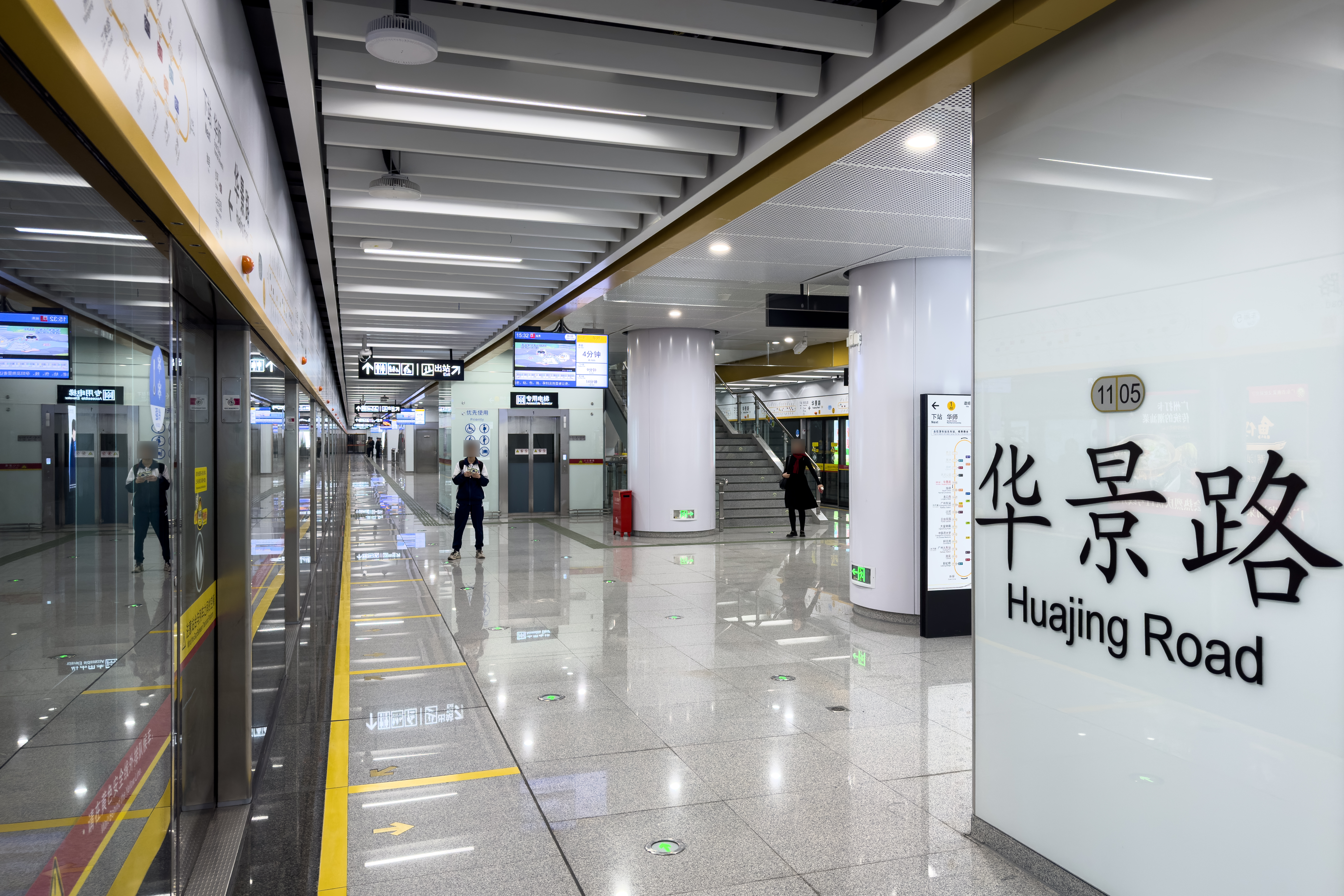
- Platform 1

Chinese name
- Simplified Chinese: 华景路站
- Traditional Chinese: 華景路站
Transcriptions
Standard Mandarin
- Hanyu Pinyin: Huájǐnglù Zhàn
Yue: Cantonese
- Yale Romanization: Wǎgínglǒu Jaahm
- Jyutping: waa^{4}ging^{2} lou^{6} Zaam^{6}

General information
- Location: Intersection of Zhongshan Avenue West (中山大道西) and Dongfang 1st Road (东方一路), border of Tianyuan and Tangxia Subdistricts; Tianhe District, Guangzhou, Guangdong; China
- Coordinates: 23°8′13.52″N 113°21′15.19″E
- Operator: Guangzhou Metro Co. Ltd.
- Line: Line 11
- Platforms: 2 (1 island platform)
- Tracks: 2

Construction
- Structure type: Underground
- Accessible: Yes

Other information
- Station code: 1105

History
- Opened: 28 December 2024 (19 months ago)

Services
Preceding station	Guangzhou Metro	Following station
South China Normal University Outer Circle	Line 11	Tianhe Park Inner Circle
Location

Huajing Road station (Chinese: 华景路站; pinyin: Huájǐnglù Zhàn; Cantonese Yale: Wǎgínglǒu Jaahm) is a station of Line 11 of the Guangzhou Metro. It started operations on 28 December 2024. It is located underground at the intersection of Zhongshan Avenue West and Dongfang 1st Road in Tianhe District.

== Station Layout ==
G	-	Exits A, B1, C
L1	Lobby	Ticket Machines, Customer Service, Shops, Police Station, Security Facilities
L2; Platforms	Platform 1	11 Outer Circle (South China Normal University)
L2; Platforms	Island platform, doors will open on the left (Toilets, Nursery)
L2; Platforms	Platform 2	11 Inner Circle (Tianhe Park)

=== Entrances/exits ===
The station has 3 points of entry/exit, each with escalators. The surface part of Exit A is co-constructed with the reconstructed BRT Huajing New Town station pedestrian bridge staircase. Exit C is equipped with an elevator.

- A: Zhongshan Avenue West, BRT Huajing New Town station (Eastbound)
- B1: Zhongshan Avenue West, The Third Affiliated Hospital Of South China Medical University, Guangdong Polytechnic Normal University East Campus, BRT Huajing New Town station (Eastbound)
- C: Zhongshan Avenue West, BRT Huajing New Town station (Westbound)
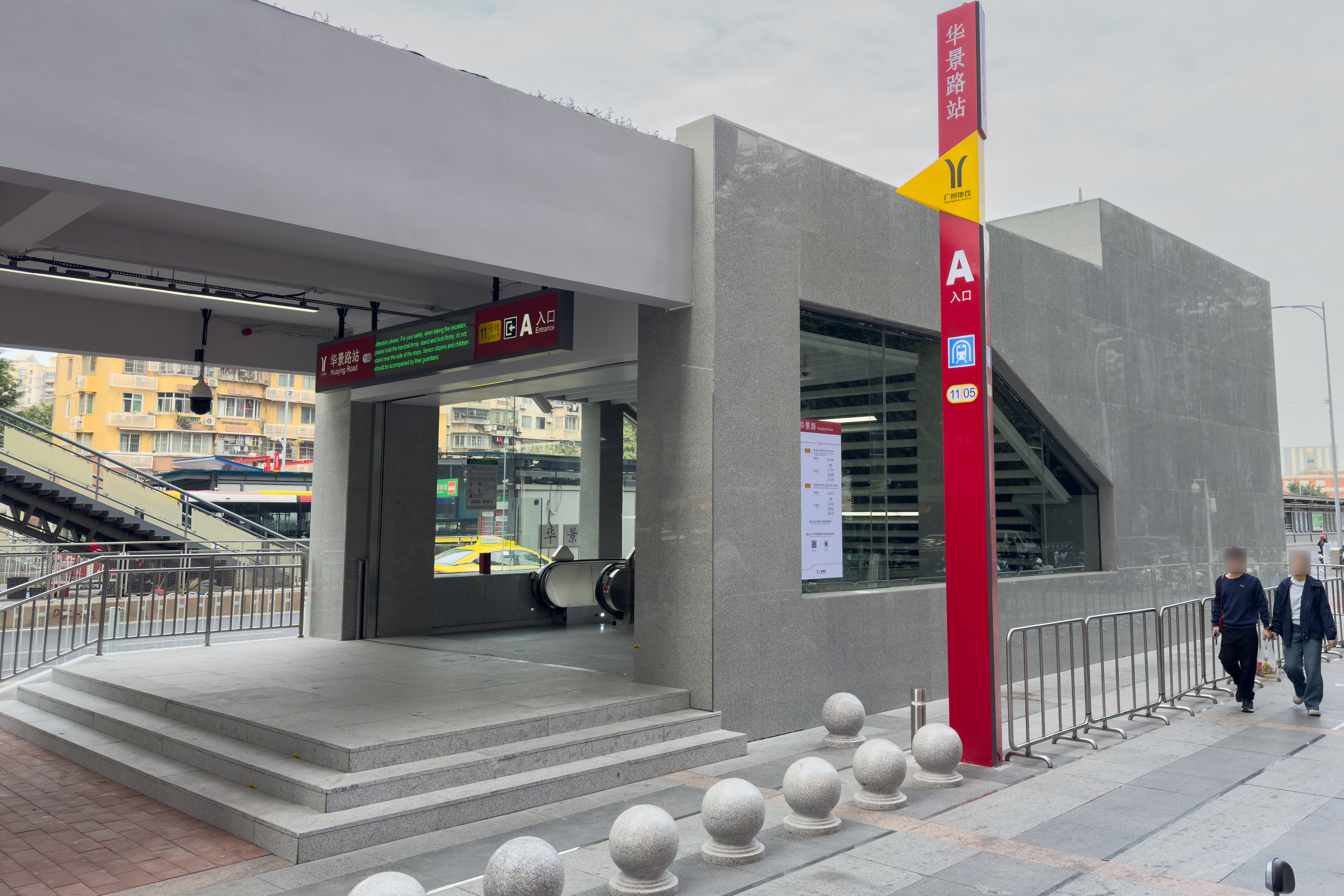
Entrance A

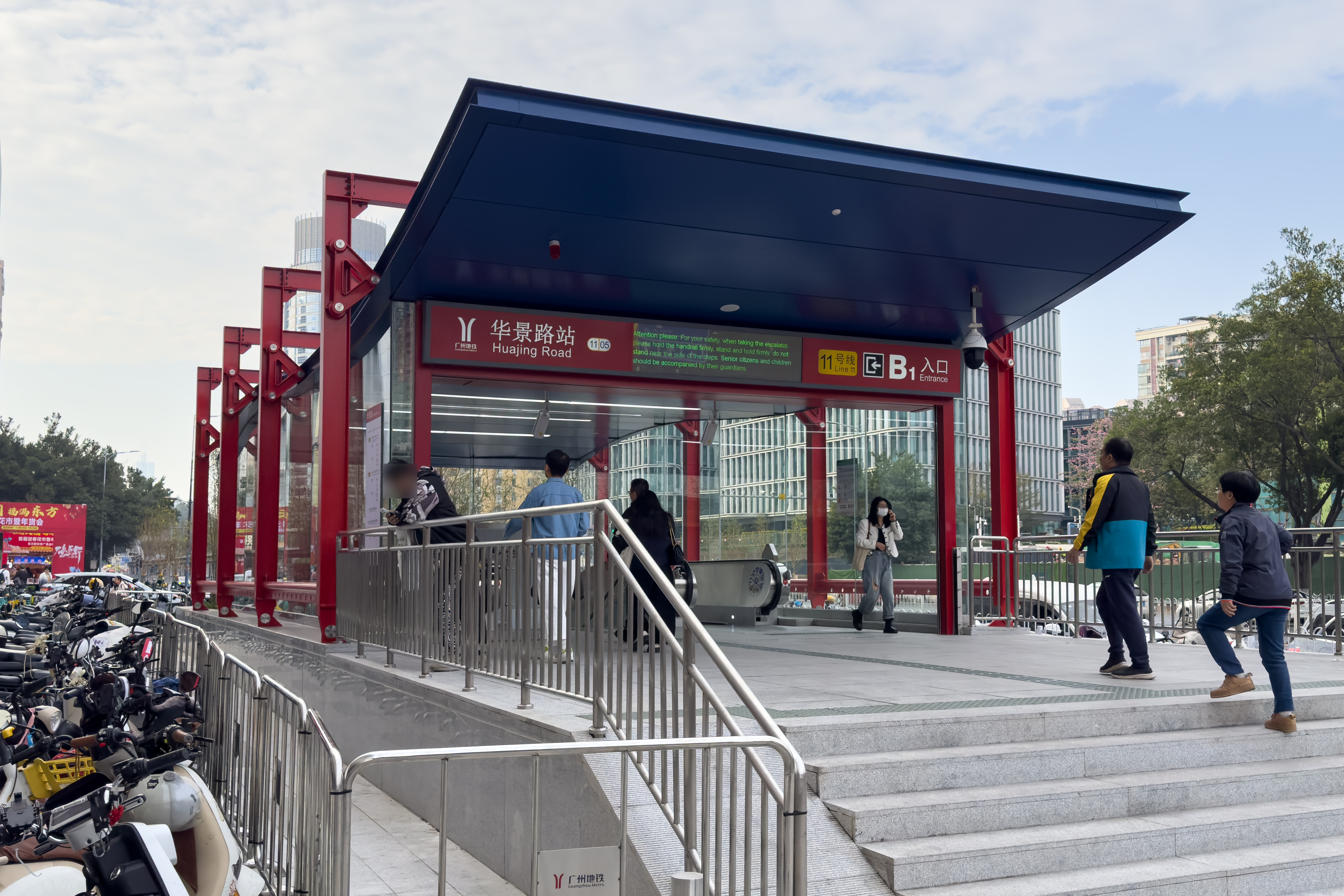
Entrance B1

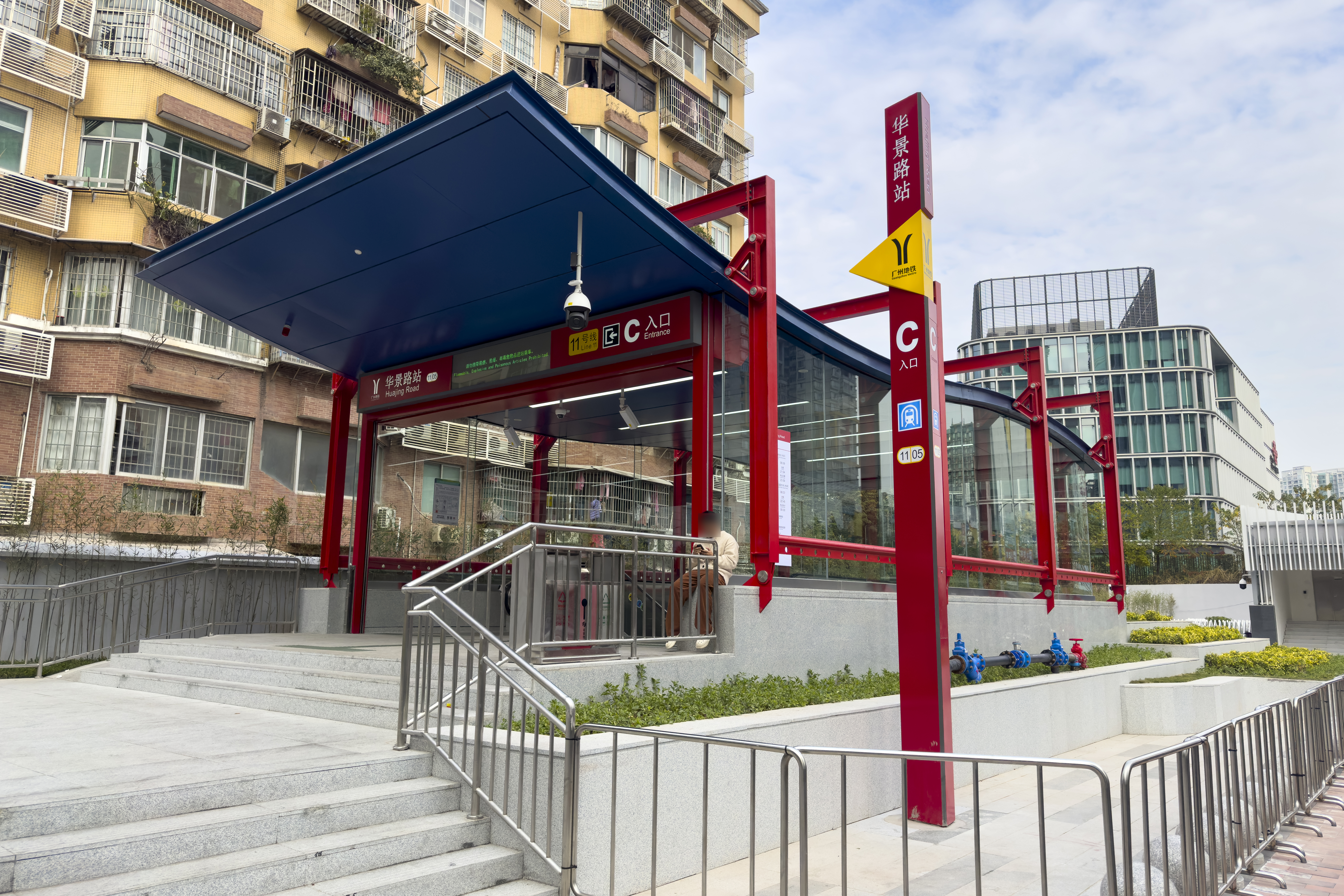
Entrance C

== History ==
When Line 11 was first planned, the station was named Yueken, Zhongshan Avenue West, and Post and Branch Stations, and was finally determined as Huajing Road station.

On 20 September 2024, the station completed the "three rights" transfer.

== Future development ==
Line 19 will set up a station at Huajing Road, which intersects with Line 11. However, Line 19 is a long-term planned route, and Line 11 was built without any reservations, and the location of the station and the transfer method are still unknown.

== Gallery ==
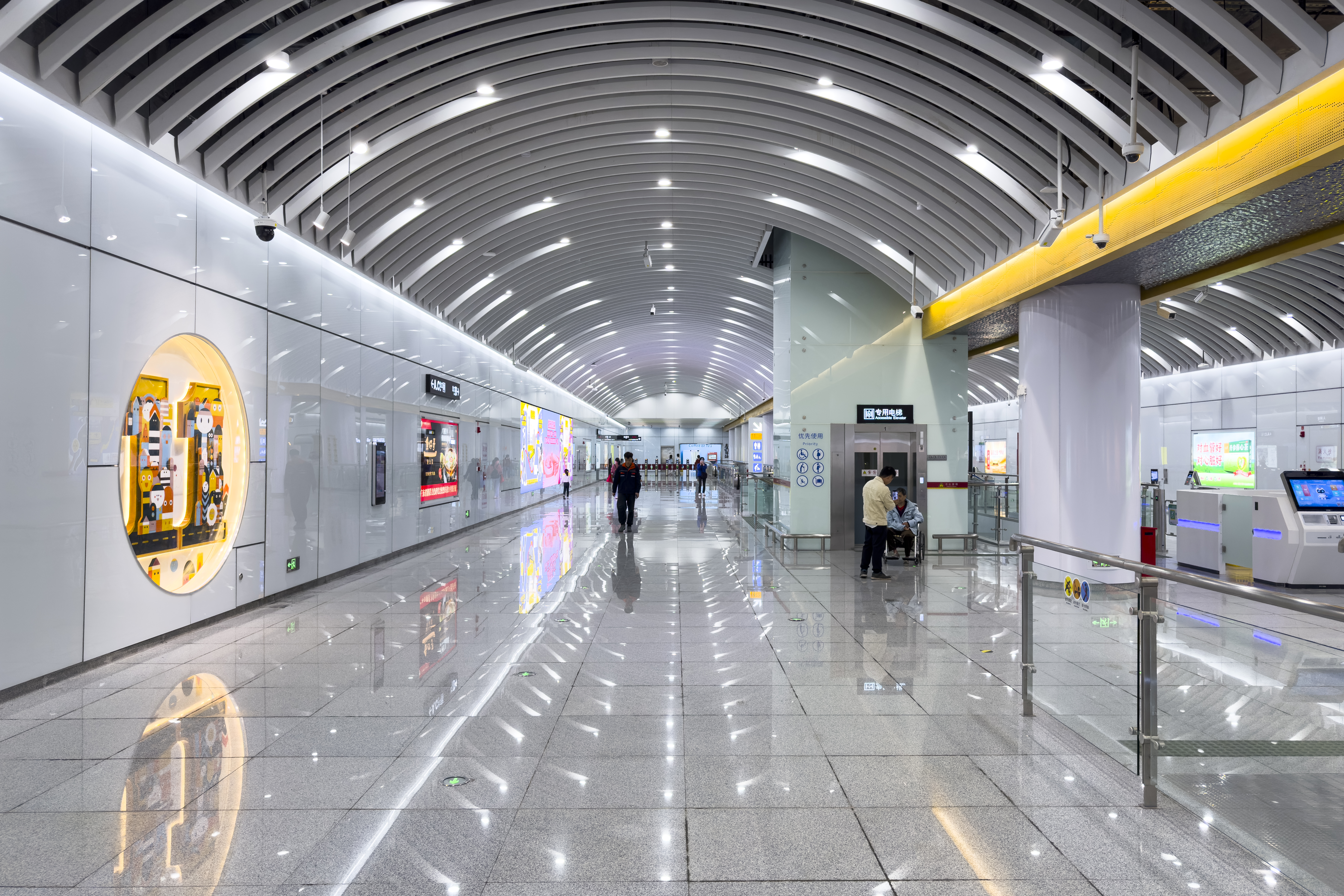
Concourse

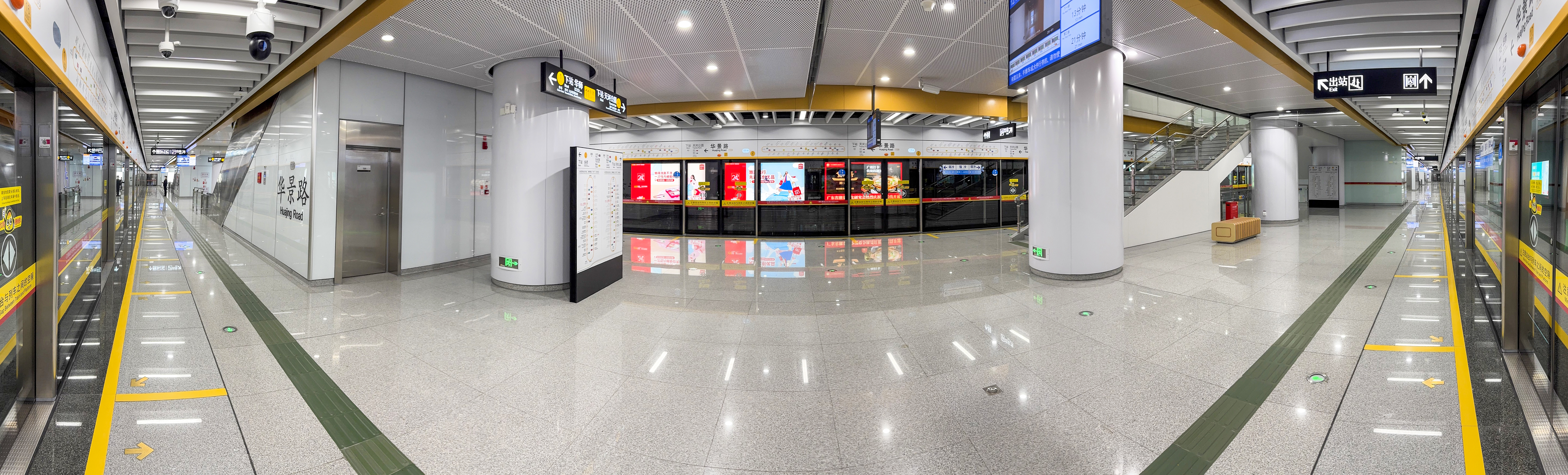
Platform 1 panorama
