= Wushan station =

Guangzhou Metro station

Coordinates: 23.1529°N 113.3517°E

Wushan 五山
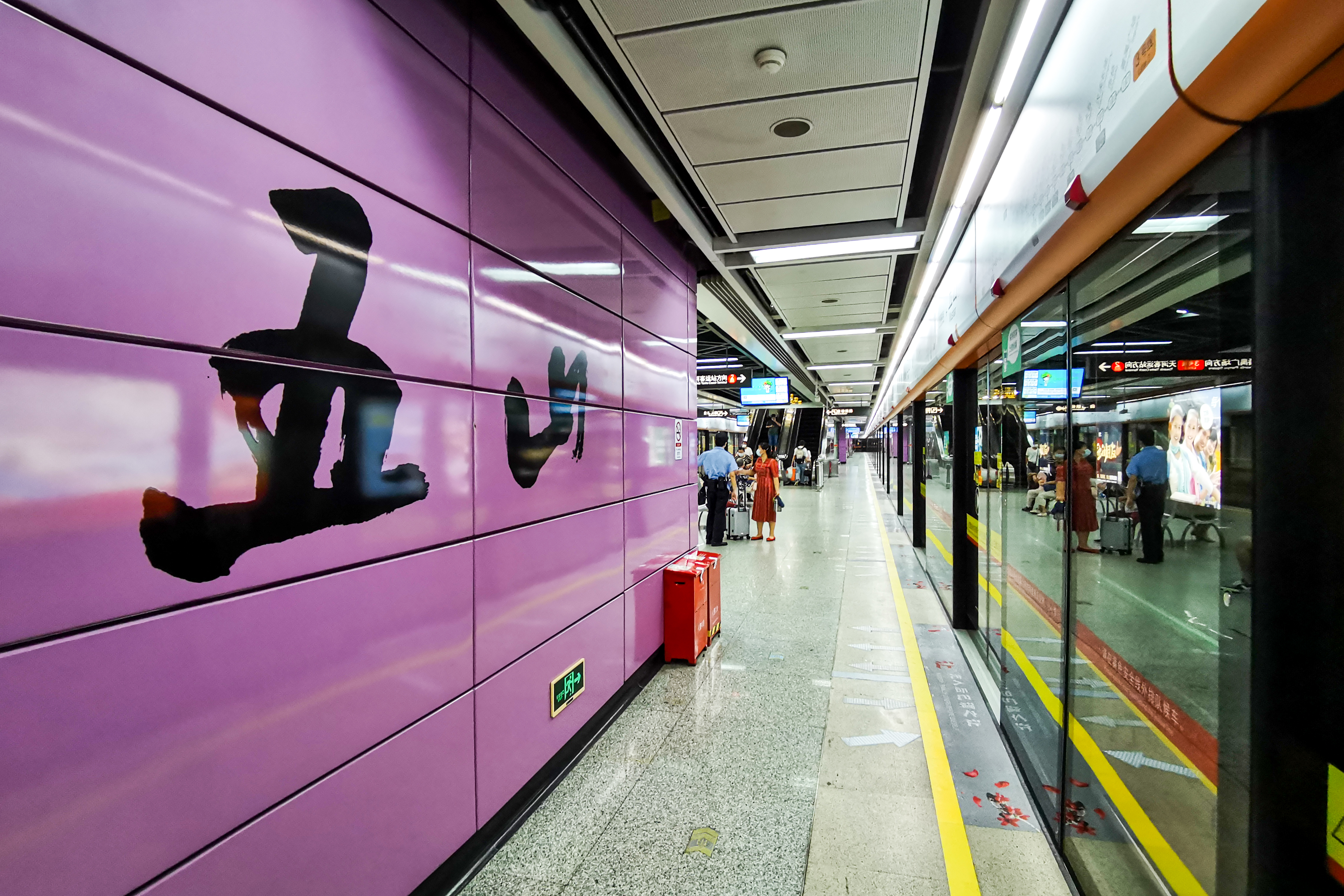

Chinese name
- Chinese: 五山站
- Literal meaning: Five Hills station
Transcriptions
Standard Mandarin
- Hanyu Pinyin: Wǔshān Zhàn
Yue: Cantonese
- Yale Romanization: Ńghsāan Jaahm
- Jyutping: Ng^{5}saan^{1} Zaam^{6}
- Hong Kong Romanization: Ng Shan station

General information
- Location: Tianhe District, Guangzhou, Guangdong; China
- Operated by: Guangzhou Metro Co. Ltd.
- Lines: Line 3 (Future: Line 10)
- Platforms: 2 (1 island platform)

Construction
- Structure type: Underground

History
- Opened: 30 December 2006; 19 years ago

Services
Preceding station	Guangzhou Metro	Following station
South China Normal University towards Haibang	Line 3	Tianhe Coach Terminal Terminus
Future services
South China Normal University towards Xilang	Line 10	Tianhe Coach Terminal Terminus
Location

Wushan Station (Chinese: 五山站; Jyutping: ng^{5} saan^{1} zaam^{6}; Cantonese Yale: Ńghsāan Jaahm; lit. 'Five Hills station') is a station on Line 3 of the Guangzhou Metro, which started operations on 30 December 2006. It is located under the junction of Yuehan Road (粤汉路) and Yuezhou Road (岳洲路) in the Tianhe District of Guangzhou, adjacent to the South China Agricultural University.

== Station layout ==
G	Street level	Exit
L1; Concourse	Lobby	Customer Service, Shops, Vending machines, ATMs
L2; Platforms	Platform 1	3 towards Haibang (South China Normal University)
L2; Platforms	Island platform, doors will open on the left
L2; Platforms	Platform 2	3 towards Tianhe Coach Terminal (Terminus)

== Exits ==
Exit number		Exit location
Exit A		Yuehan Lu
Exit B	B1	Wushan Lu
Exit C		Wushan Lu
