= Longkou West station =

Guangzhou Metro Line 11 station

Longkou West 龙口西
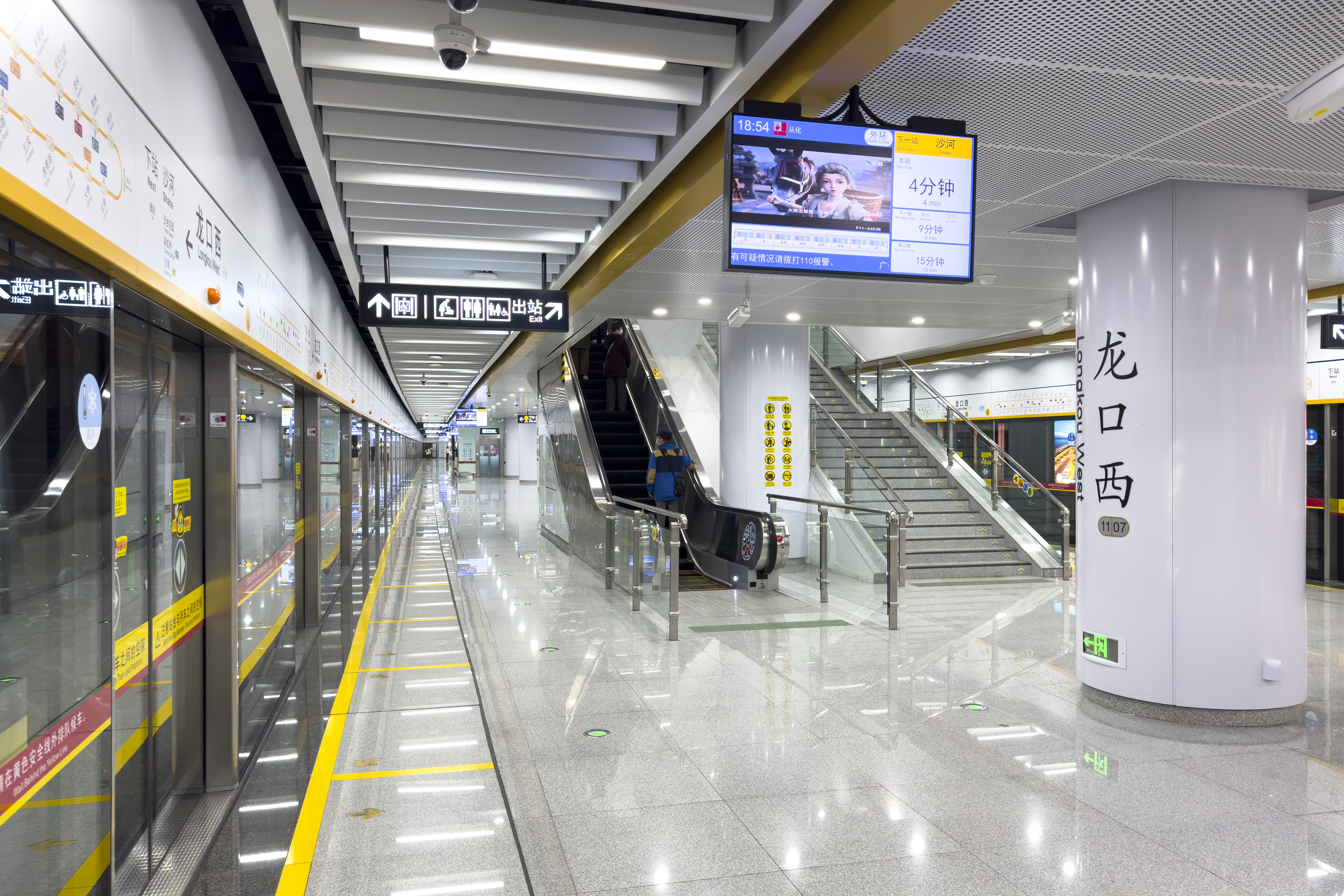
- Platform

Chinese name
- Simplified Chinese: 龙口西站
- Traditional Chinese: 龍口西站
Transcriptions
Standard Mandarin
- Hanyu Pinyin: Lóngkǒuxī Zhàn
Yue: Cantonese
- Yale Romanization: Lǔngháusāi Jaahm
- Jyutping: lung^{4}hau^{2}sai^{1} Zaam^{6}

General information
- Location: Intersection of Longkou West Road (龙口西路) and Huayue Road (华粵路), Shipai Subdistrict; Tianhe District, Guangzhou, Guangdong; China
- Coordinates: 23°8′37″N 113°20′5″E
- Operator: Guangzhou Metro Co. Ltd.
- Line: Line 11
- Platforms: 2 (1 island platform)
- Tracks: 2

Construction
- Structure type: Underground
- Accessible: Yes

Other information
- Station code: 1107

History
- Opened: 28 December 2024 (19 months ago)
- Former names: Tianhe East (天河东)

Services
| Preceding station | Guangzhou Metro | Following station |
|---|---|---|
| Guangzhou East Railway Station Outer Circle | Line 11 | South China Normal University Inner Circle |
Location

Longkou West Station (simplified Chinese: 龙口西站; traditional Chinese: 龍口西站; pinyin: Lóngkǒuxī Zhàn; Cantonese Yale: Lǔngháusāi Jaahm) is a station of Line 11 of the Guangzhou Metro. It started operations on 28 December 2024. It is located underground at the intersection of Longkou Road West and Zhongyue Road in Tianhe District.

== Station Layout ==
| G | - | Exits A, B, C, D |
| L1 | Mezzanine | Passageways between lobby and exits B, C and D |
| L2 | Mezzanine | Passageway between lobby and exit B |
| L3 | Lobby | Ticket Machines, Customer Service, Shops, Police Station, Security Facilities, Toilets, Nursery |
| L4; Platforms | Platform 1 | 11 Outer Circle (Guangzhou East Railway Station) |
| L4; Platforms | Island platform, doors will open on the left |
| L4; Platforms | Platform 2 | 11 Inner Circle (South China Normal University) |

=== Entrances/exits ===
The station has 4 points of entry/exit. Exit D is equipped with an elevator.

- A (Note: The stairs and escalators at the entrance and exit are limited by the ground environment and are arranged separately.): Tianhe North Road
- B (Note: There are two elevators at this entrance and exit connected to the mezzanine level of the basement floor, and the first basement floor still needs to be accessed by stairs from the ground floor.): Tianhe North Road
- C: Tianhe North Road, Guangdong Academy of Social Sciences, Guangdong Province Historical Gallery
- D: Tianhe North Road
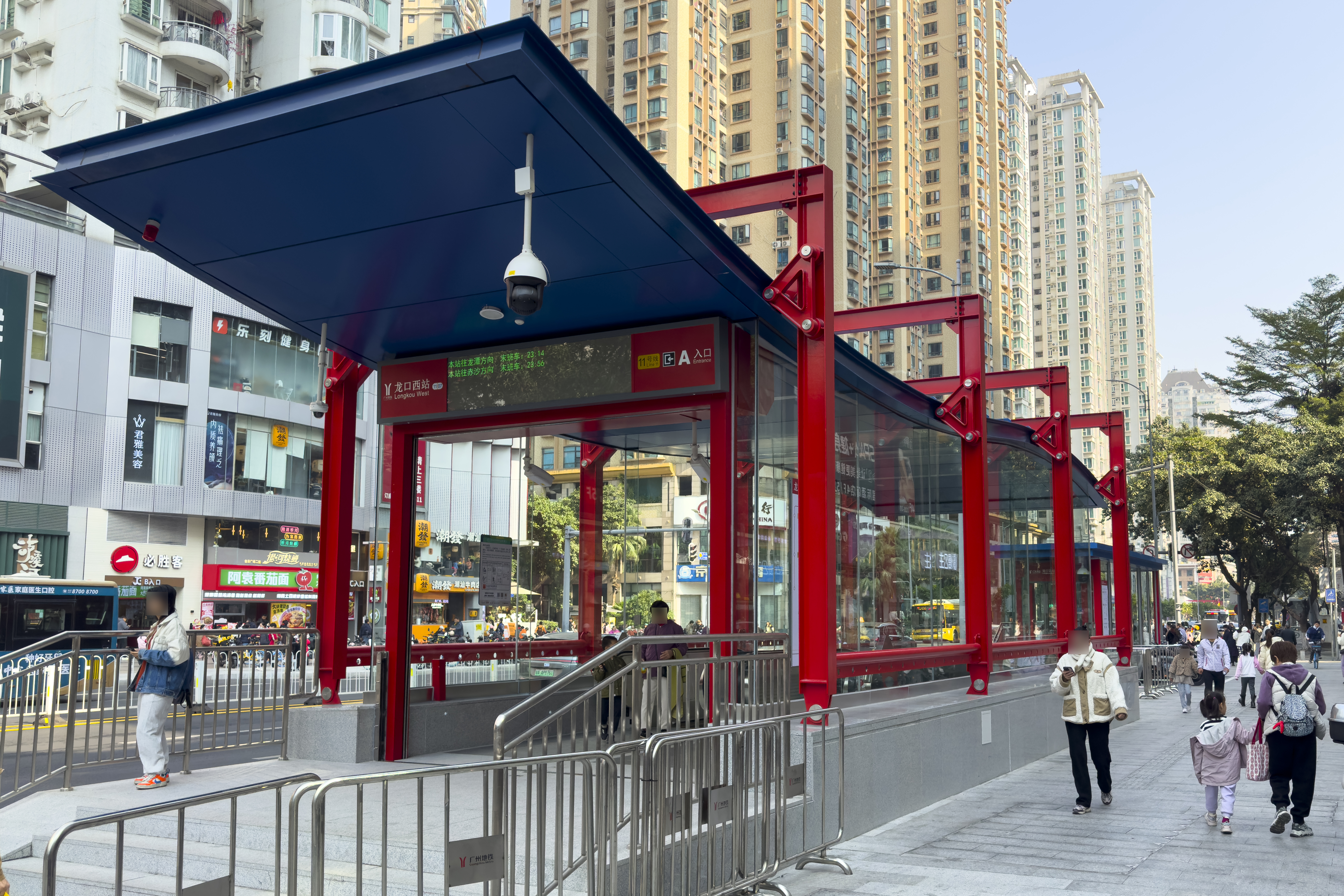
Entrance A

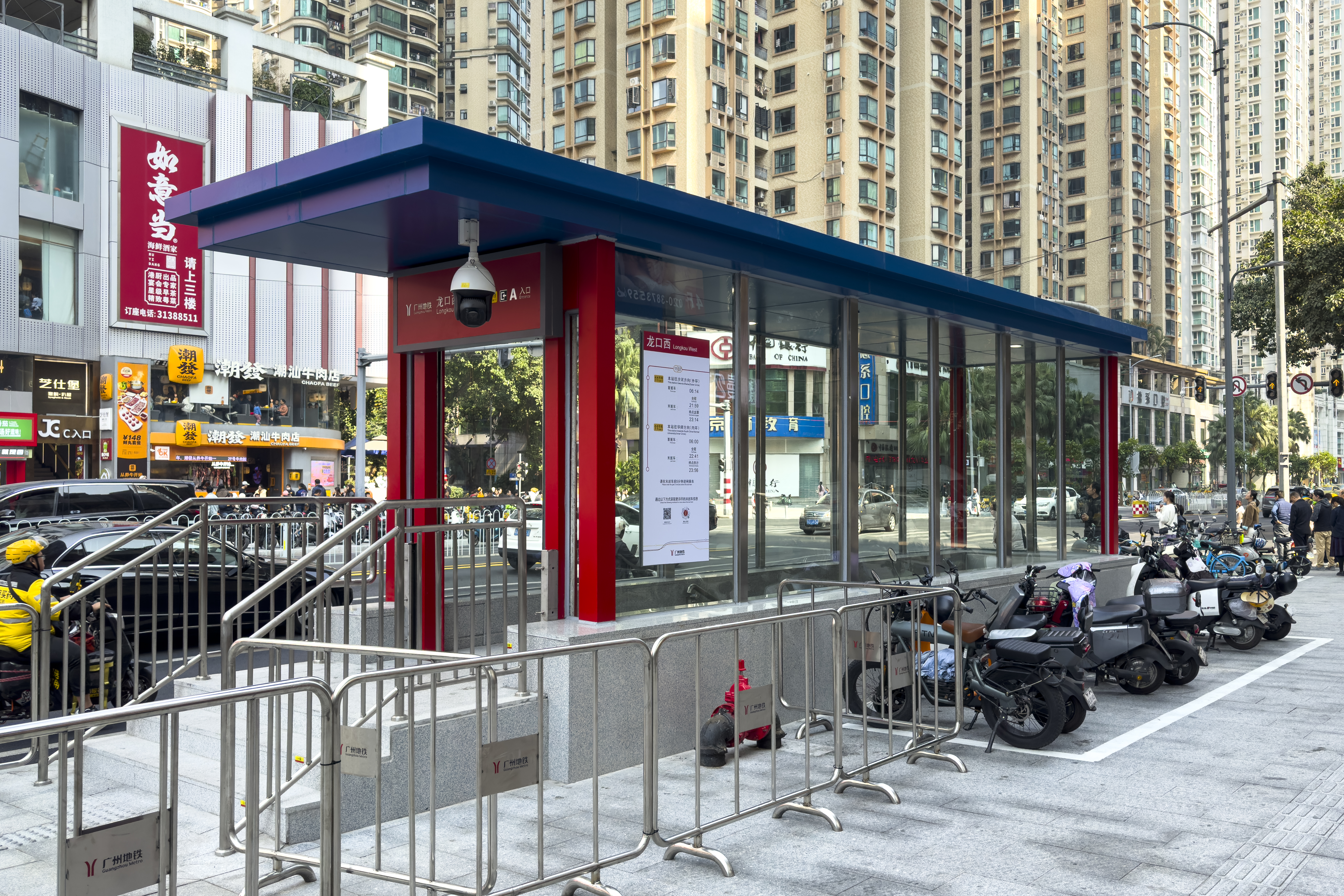
Stairs of Entrance A

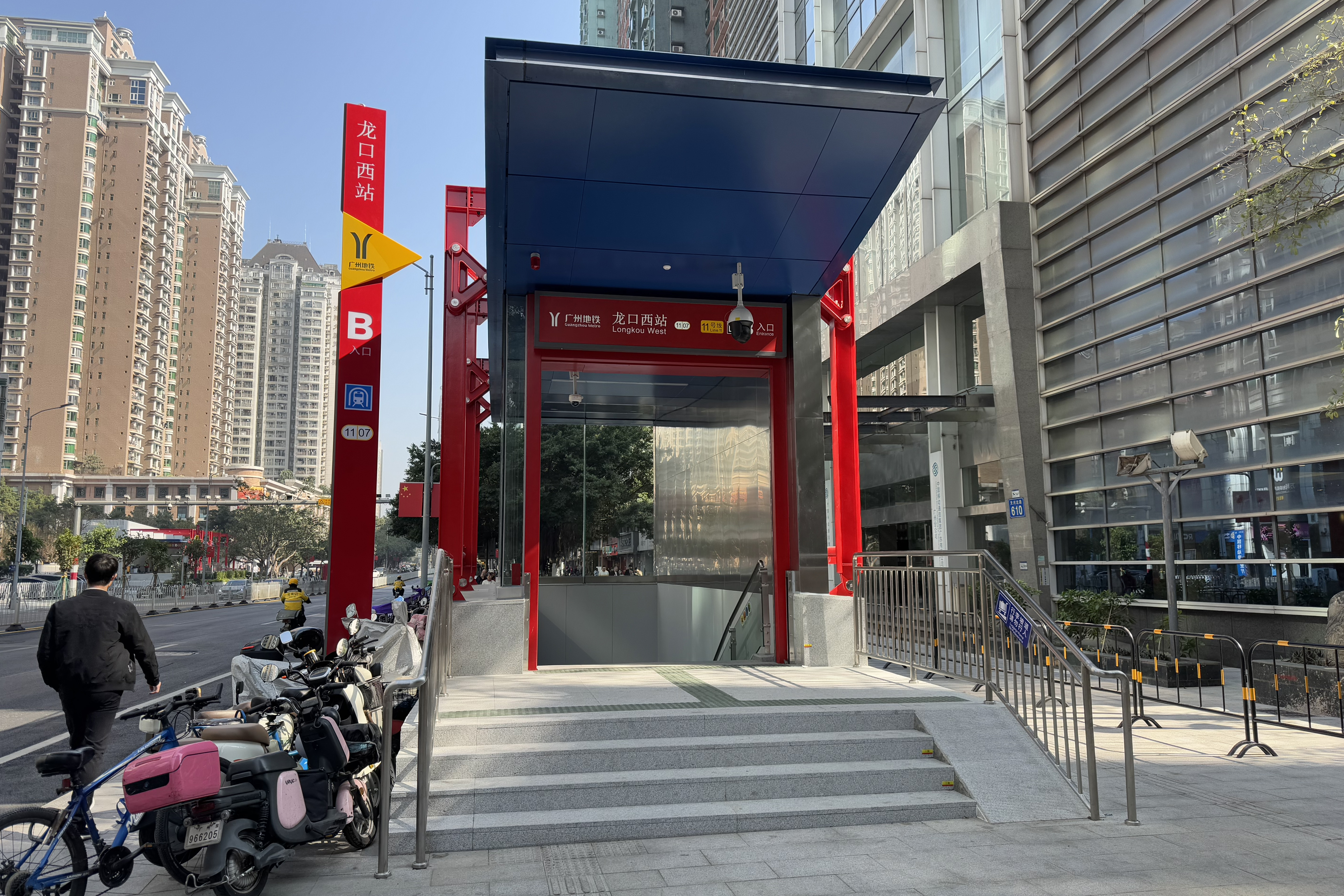
Entrance B

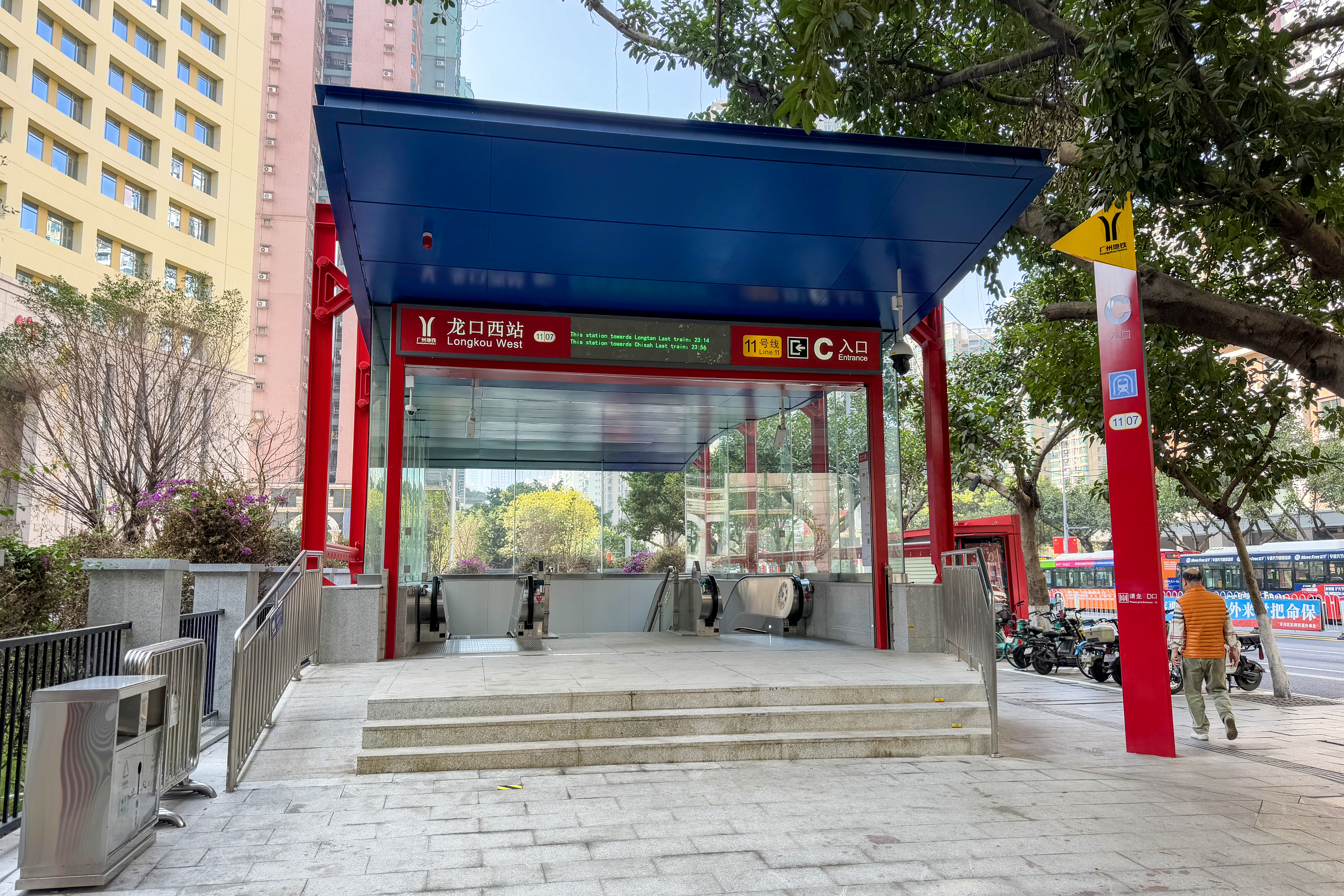
Entrance C

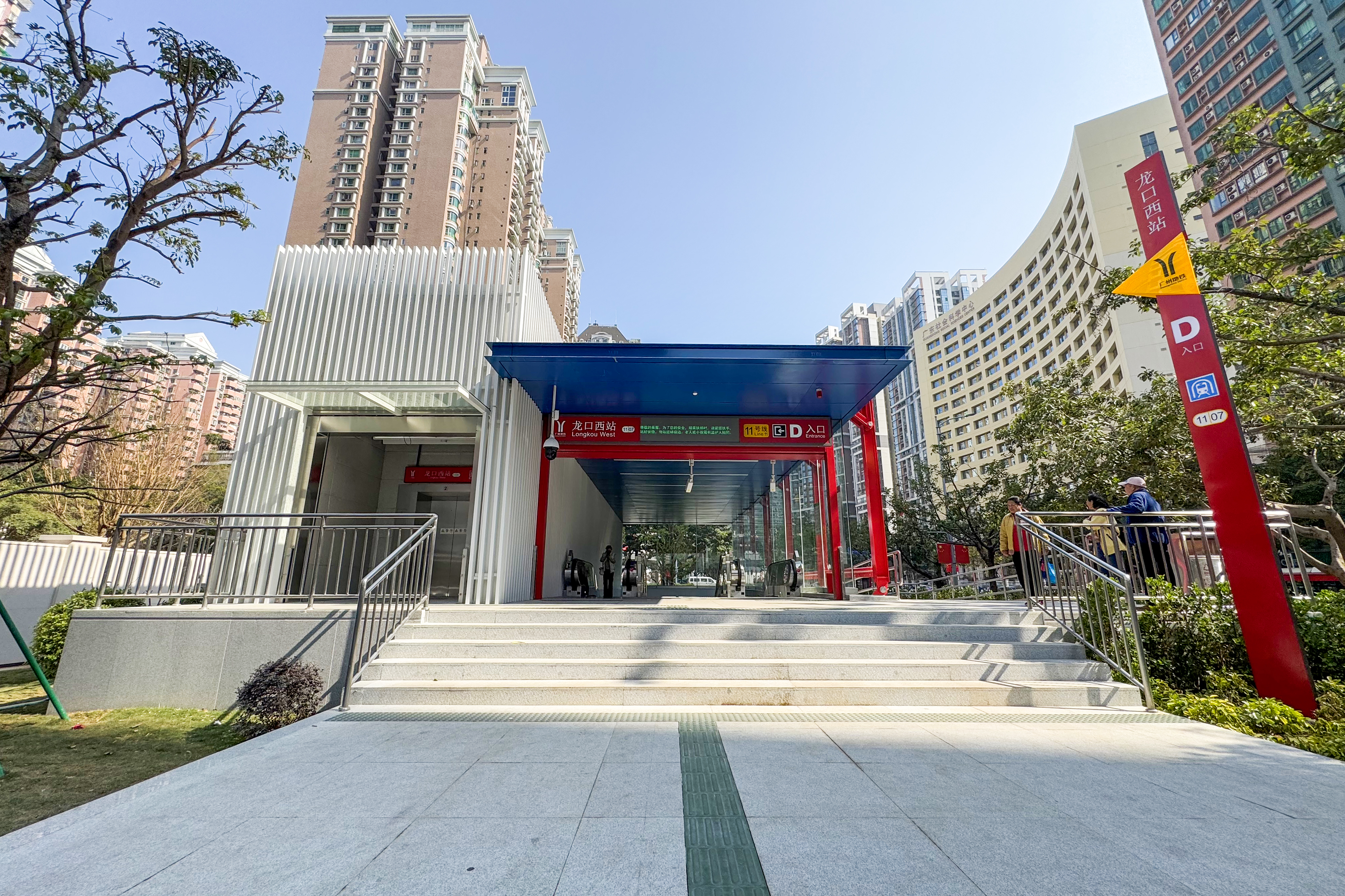
Entrance D

== History ==
At the beginning of the planning of Line 11, the station was named Longkou East, and later began construction under the name of Tianhe East. In June 2023, the initial name of the stations on Line 11 was announced, and the station is planned to be named Longkou West station, which was subsequently approved as the official station name in May 2024. On 20 September 2024, the station completed the "three rights" transfer.

On 28 December 2024, the station was put into use with the opening of Line 11.

== Gallery ==
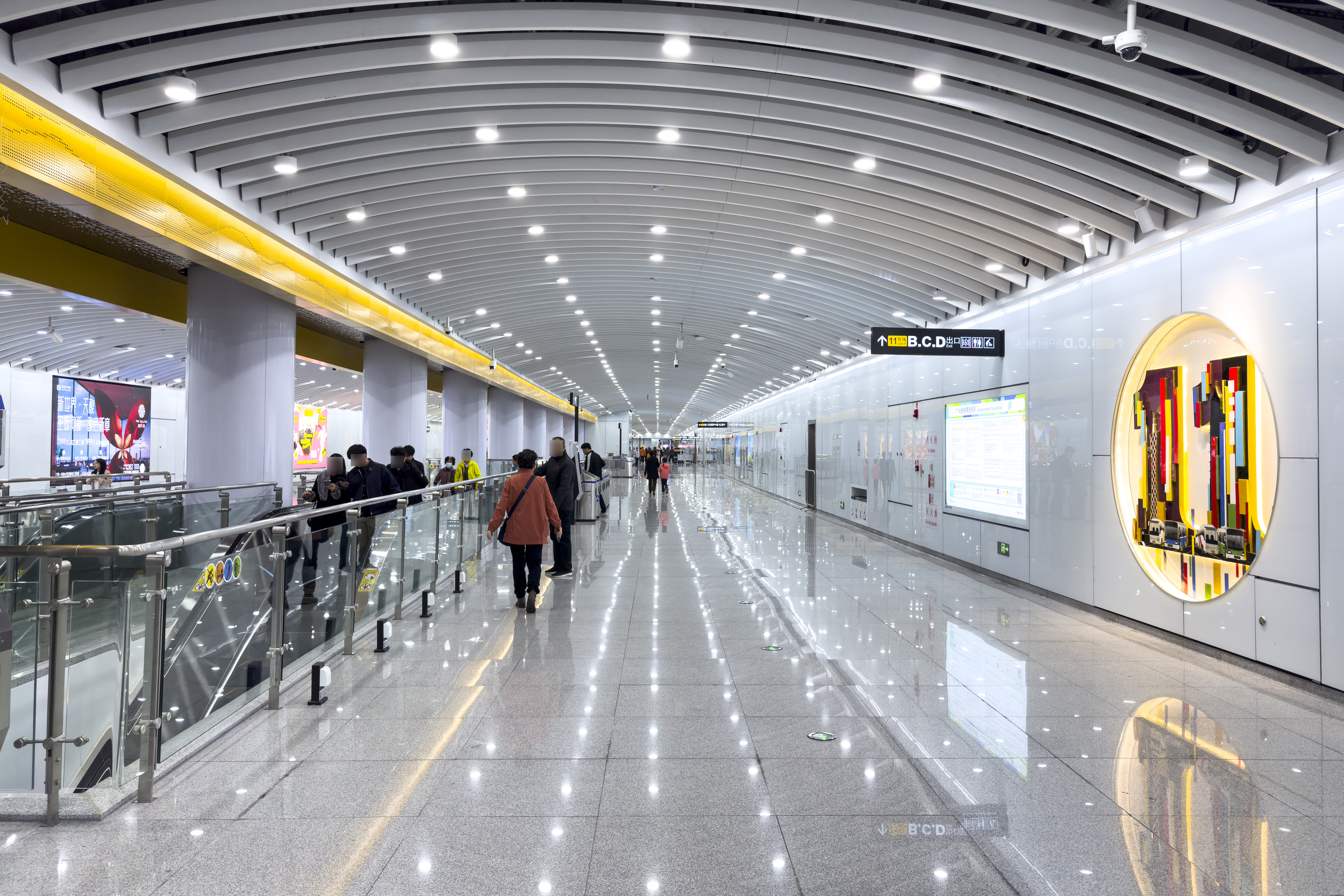
Concourse

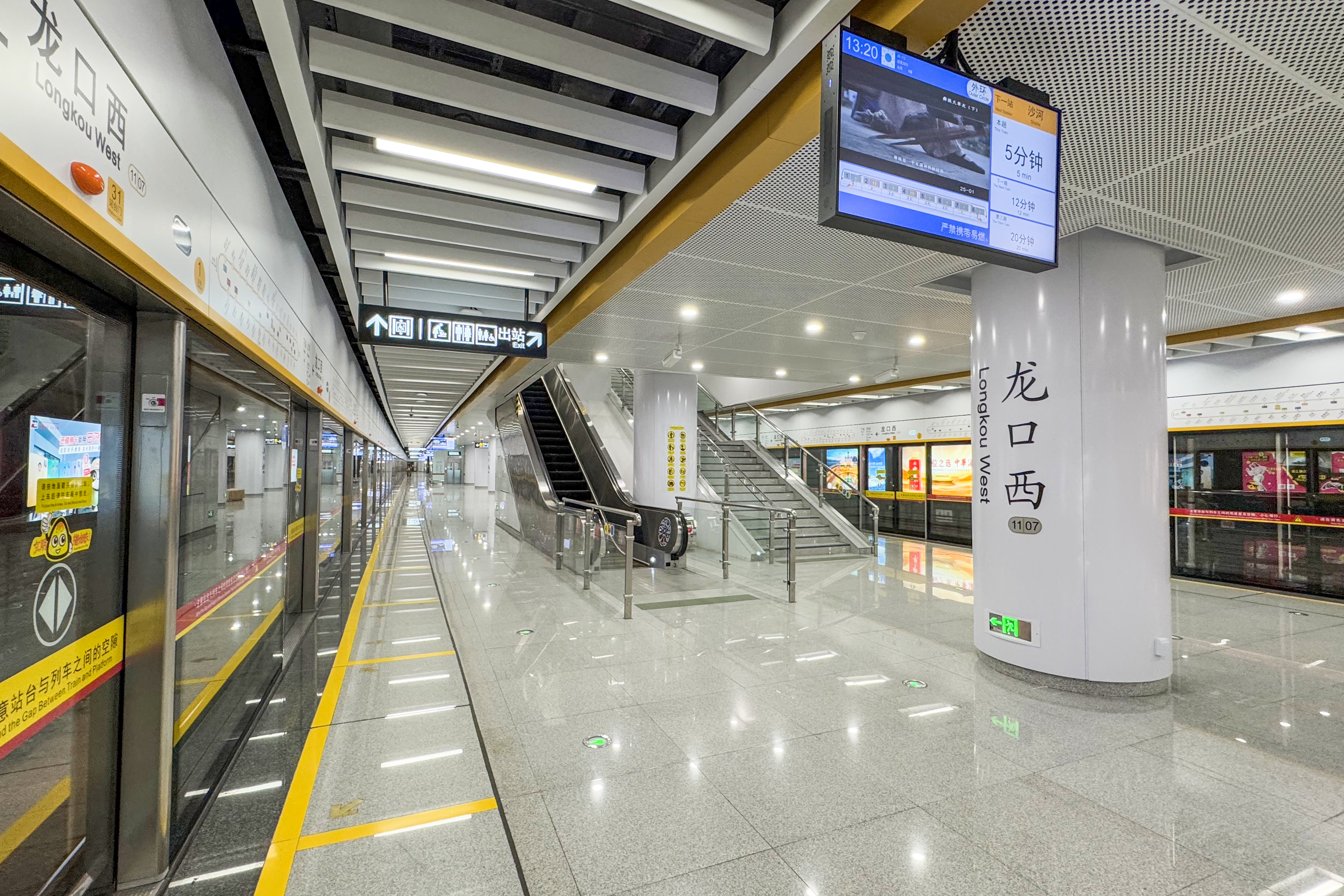
View from platform 2

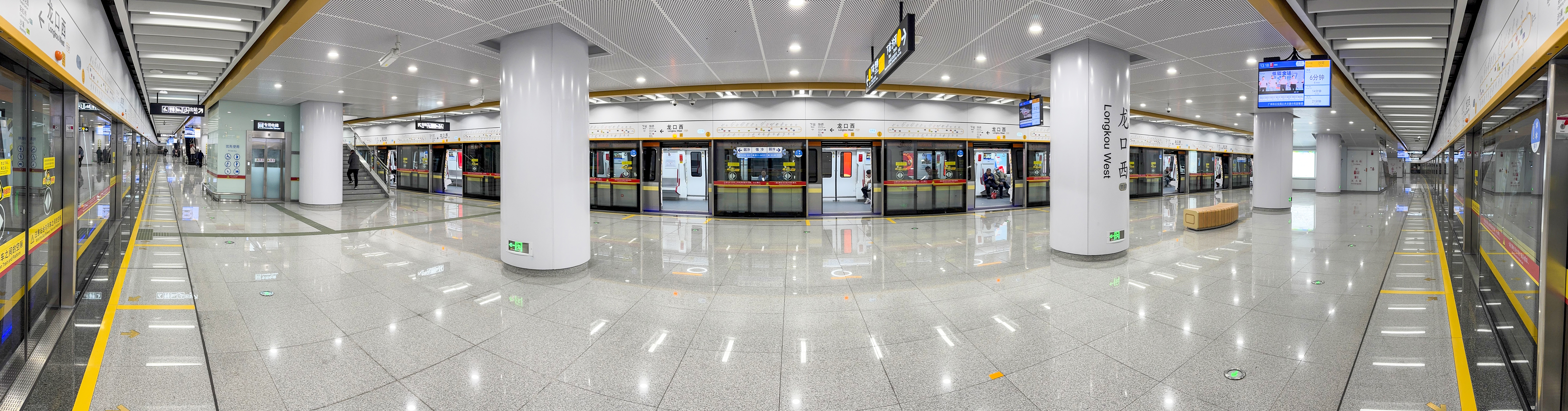
Platform 1 panorama
