= Tianhe Coach Terminal station =

Guangzhou Metro interchange station

Coordinates: 23.171°N 113.3436°E

Tianhe Coach Terminal 天河客运站
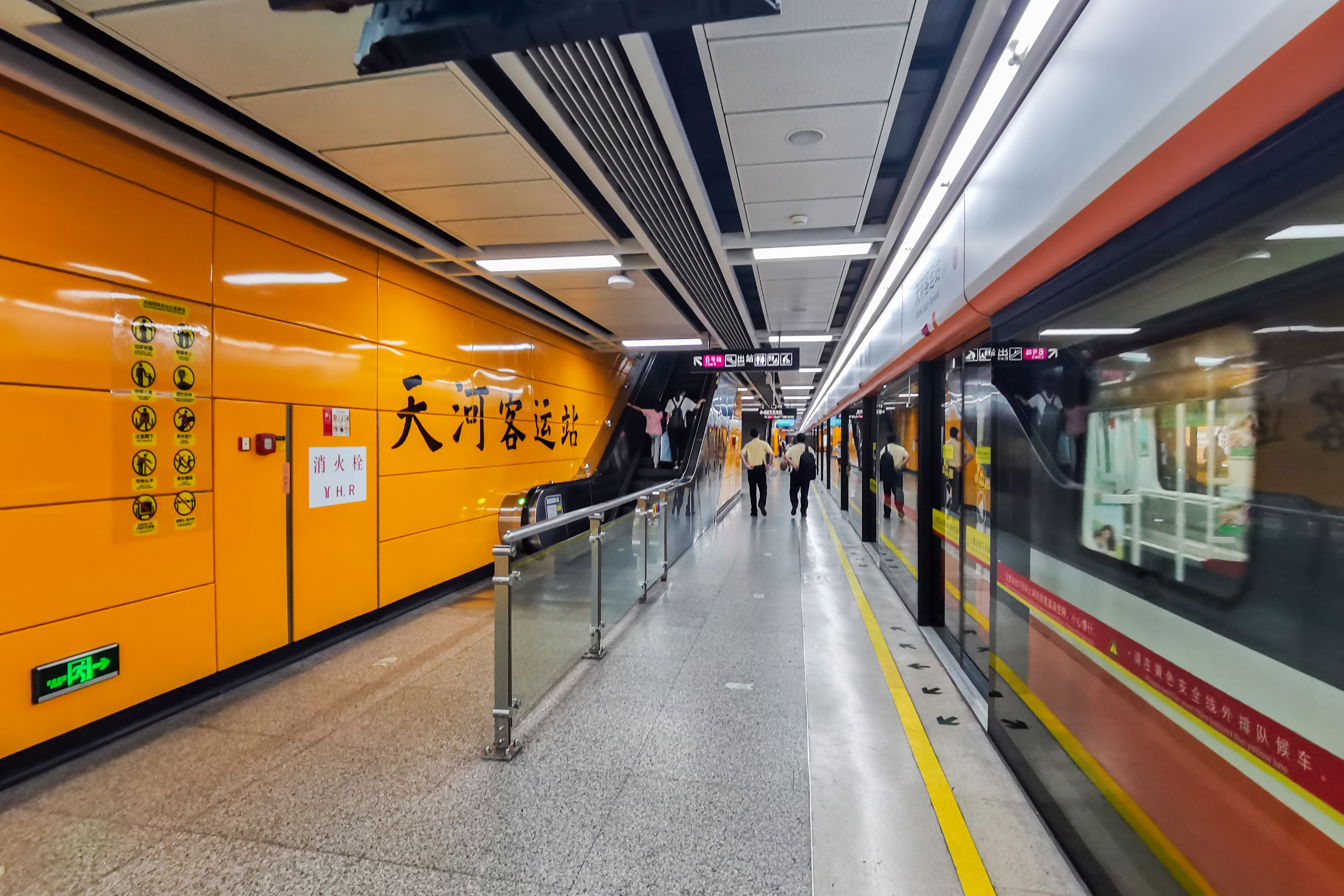
- Platform 2 (Line 3 termination platform)

Chinese name
- Simplified Chinese: 天河客运站
- Traditional Chinese: 天河客運站
Transcriptions
Standard Mandarin
- Hanyu Pinyin: Tiānhé Kèyùnzhàn
Yue: Cantonese
- Yale Romanization: Tīnhòh Haak'wahnjaahm
- Jyutping: Tin^{1}ho^{4} Haak^{3}wan^{6}zaam^{6}
- Hong Kong Romanization: Tin Ho Coach Terminal

General information
- Location: Tianhe District, Guangzhou, Guangdong; China
- Operated by: Guangzhou Metro Co. Ltd.
- Lines: Line 3; Line 6; Line 10 (2026)
- Platforms: 4 (2 side platforms and 1 island platform)
- Tracks: 4

Construction
- Structure type: Underground
- Accessible: Yes

Other information
- Station code: 316 621

History
- Opened: 30 December 2006; 19 years ago (Line 3); 28 December 2013; 12 years ago (Line 6)

Services
Preceding station	Guangzhou Metro	Following station
Wushan towards Haibang	Line 3	Terminus
Yantang towards Xunfenggang	Line 6	Changban towards Xiangxue
Future services
Wushan towards Xilang	Line 10	Terminus
Planned
Wushan towards Xilang	Line 10	Huaguan Road towards Gaotangshi
Location

Tianhe Coach Terminal Station (simplified Chinese: 天河客运站; traditional Chinese: 天河客運站; Jyutping: tin^{1} ho^{4} haak^{3} wan^{6} zaam^{6}; Cantonese Yale: Tīnhòh Haak'wahnjaahm) is an interchange station between Line 3 and Line 6 of the Guangzhou Metro, and is also the northern terminus of the Line 3 branch line. It started operations on 30 December 2006. It is located under the junction of Tianyuan Road (天源路) and the Guangzhou North Ring Expressway (广州北环高速公路) in the Tianhe District. It is also located at the East Square of the Tianhe Coach Terminal, which has services to other locations in Guangdong and other provinces. Line 6 started operations on 28 December 2013.

The Chinese name of the station never has the word 'station' (站; zaam; jaahm) at the end, as the word 'coach terminal' already has the word 'station' (客运站; Haak wan zaam; Haak'wahnjaahm; 'passenger moving station').

== Station layout ==
G	Street level	Exit
L1; Concourse	Line 6 Lobby	Ticket Machines, Customer Service, Shops, Police Station, Baby Change, Safety Facilities
L1; Concourse	Transfer Passageway	Transfer passageway between Lines 3 & 6
L1; Concourse	Line 3 Lobby	Ticket Machines, Customer Service, Shops, Police Station, Safety Facilities, Toilets
L2; Platforms	Side platform, doors will open on the right
L2; Platforms	Platform 1	3 towards Haibang (Wushan)
L2; Platforms	Platform 2	3 termination platform
L2; Platforms	Side platform, doors will open on the right
L3; Equipment Area	-	Station equipments
L3; Equipment Area	Buffer Area	Buffer area of Line 6
L4; Platforms	Platform 4	6 towards Xunfenggang (Yantang)
L4; Platforms	Island platform, doors will open on the left
L4; Platforms	Platform 3	6 towards Xiangxue (Changban)

== Exits ==
Exit number	Exit location
Exit A	Tianyuan Lu
Exit B	Yanling Lu
Exit C	Changxing Lu
Exit D	Yuangang Henglu

== Gallery ==
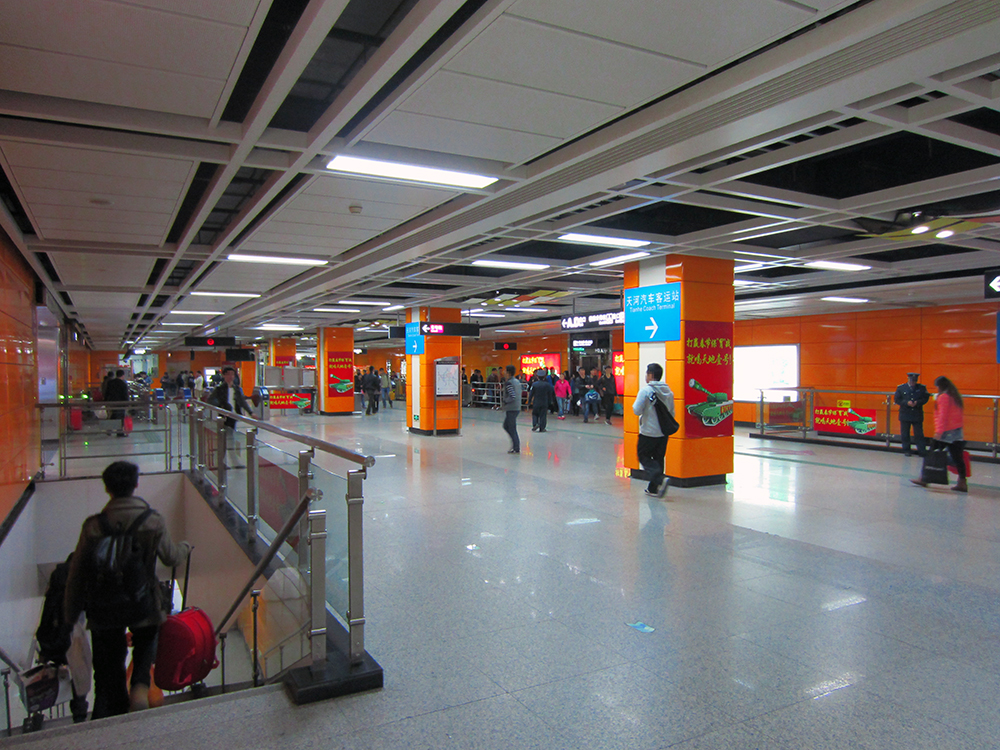
Line 3 concourse

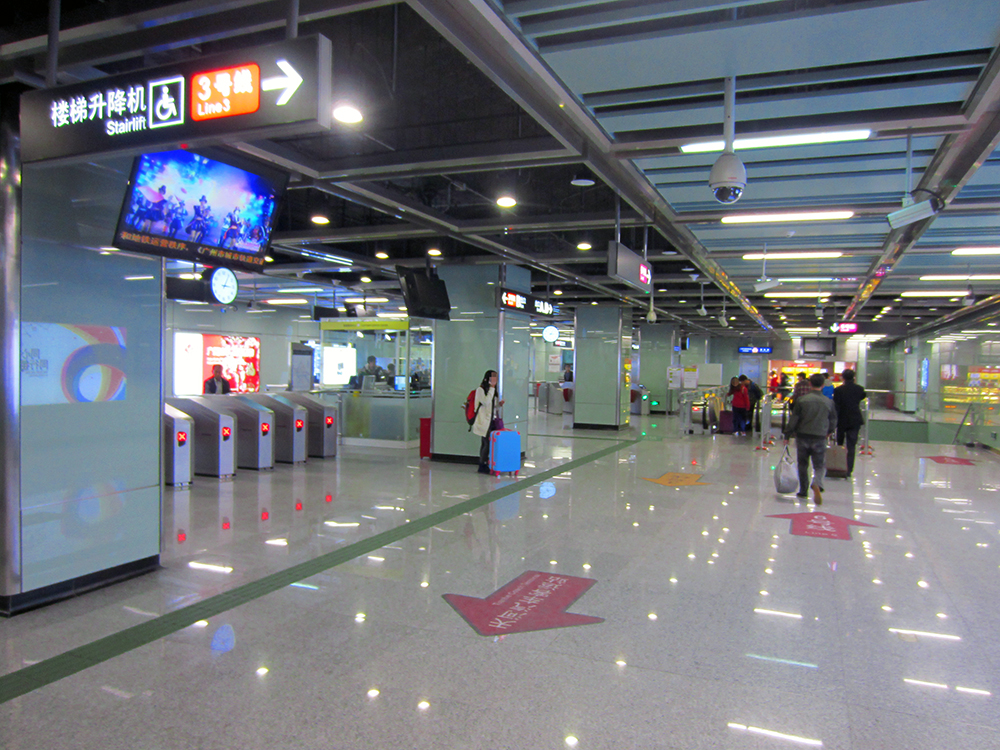
Line 6 concourse

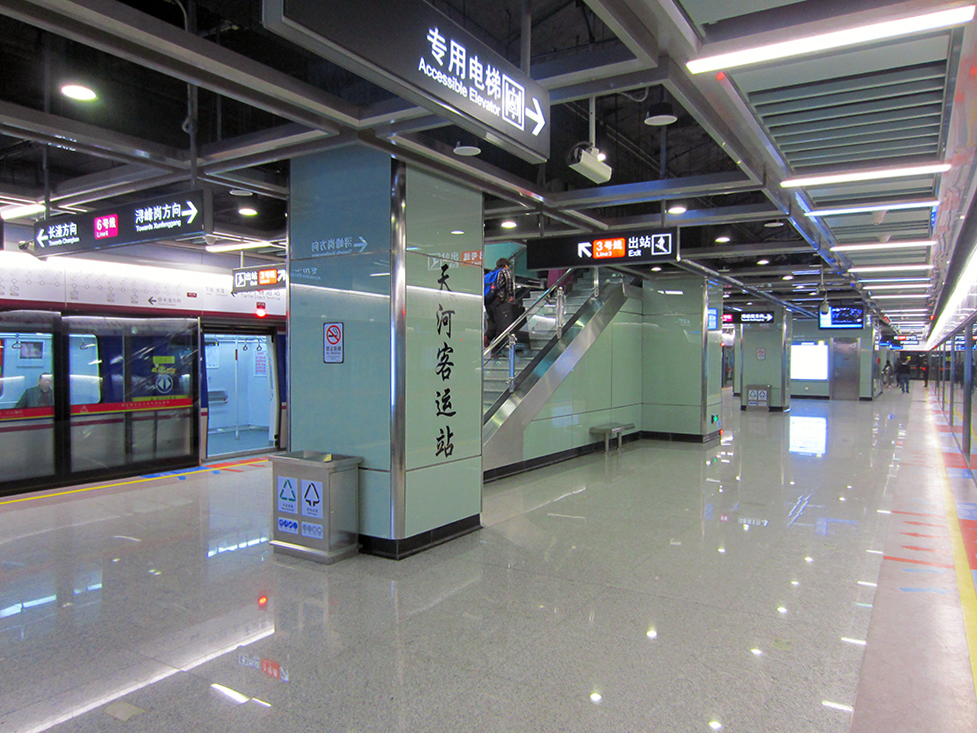
Line 6 platform

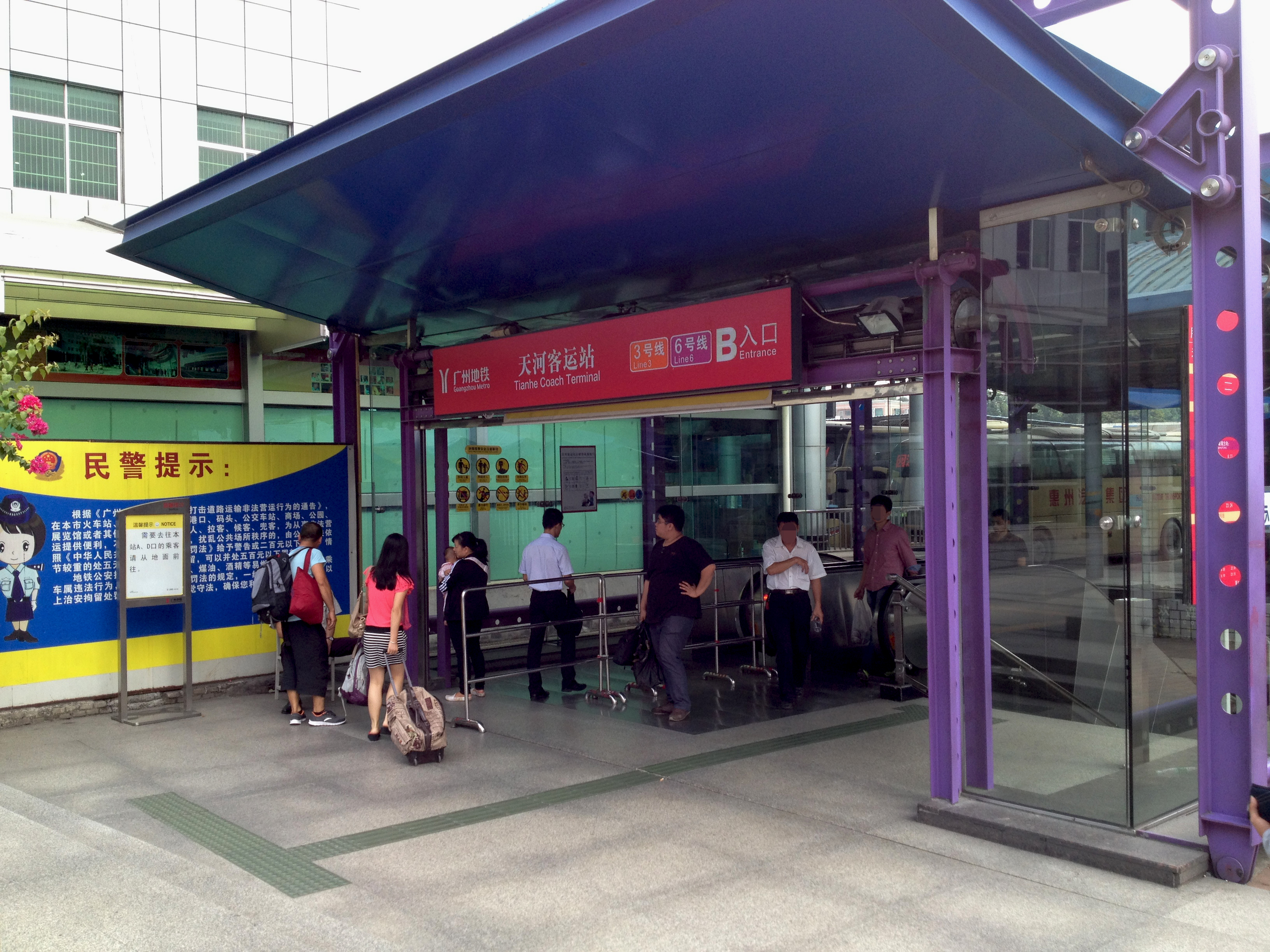
Exit B

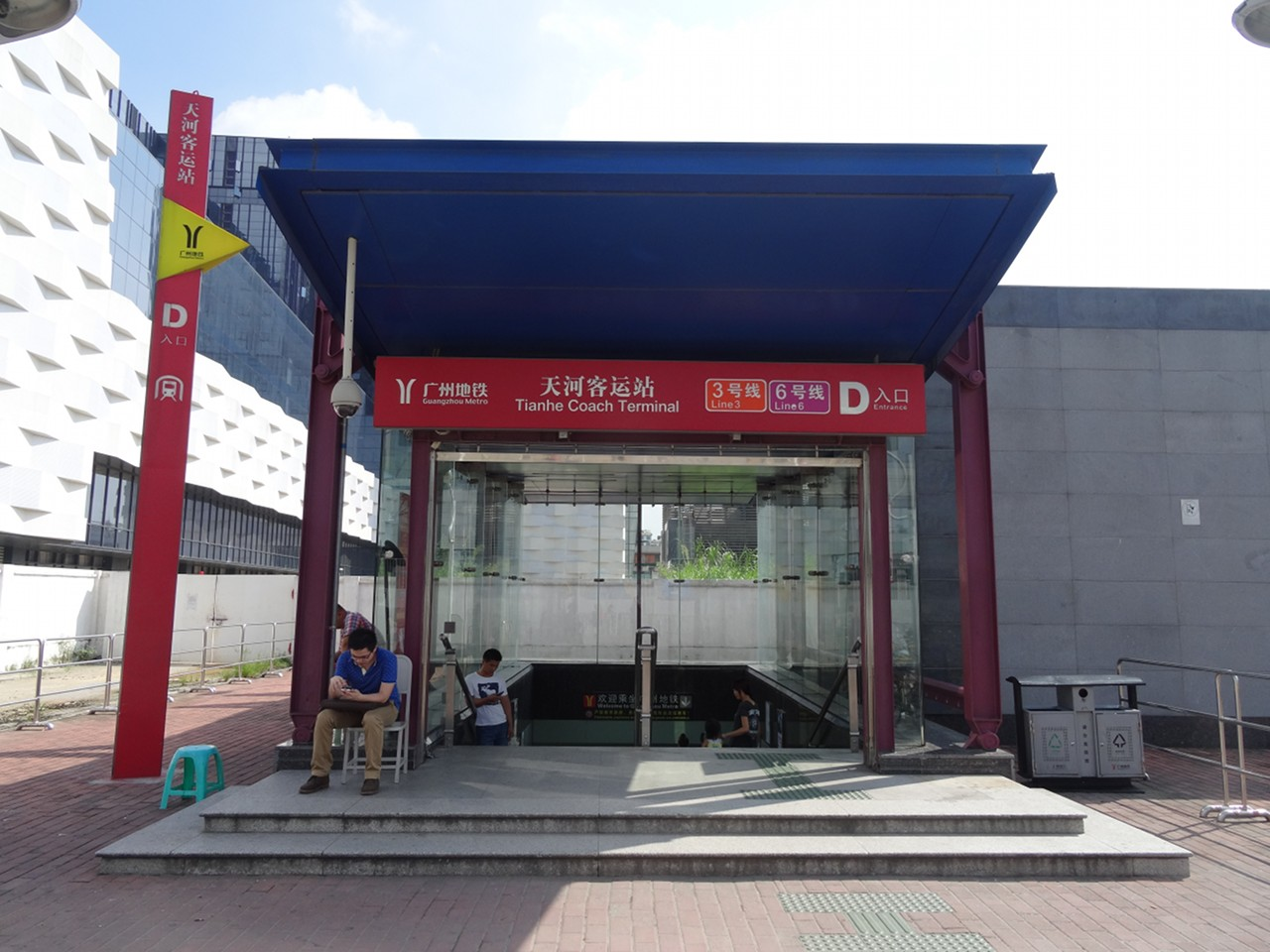
Exit D
