= Guangdong Polytechnic Normal University =

Public provincial university in China

- 广东技术师范大学 (Chinese)
- Motto: 厚德 博学 唯识 求新
- Motto in English: Thick Morality, Learn Extensively, Consciousness-only, Explore New
- Type: Public
- Established: 1957
- President: Dai Qingyun
- Undergraduates: 36,580
- Postgraduates: 2,000
- Location: Guangdong, People's Republic of China; 23.135°N 113.36544436550739°E
- Colours: Green
- Nickname: GPNU
- Website: www.gpnu.edu.cn

Chinese name
- Simplified Chinese: 广东技术师范大学
- Traditional Chinese: 廣東技術師範大學
Transcriptions

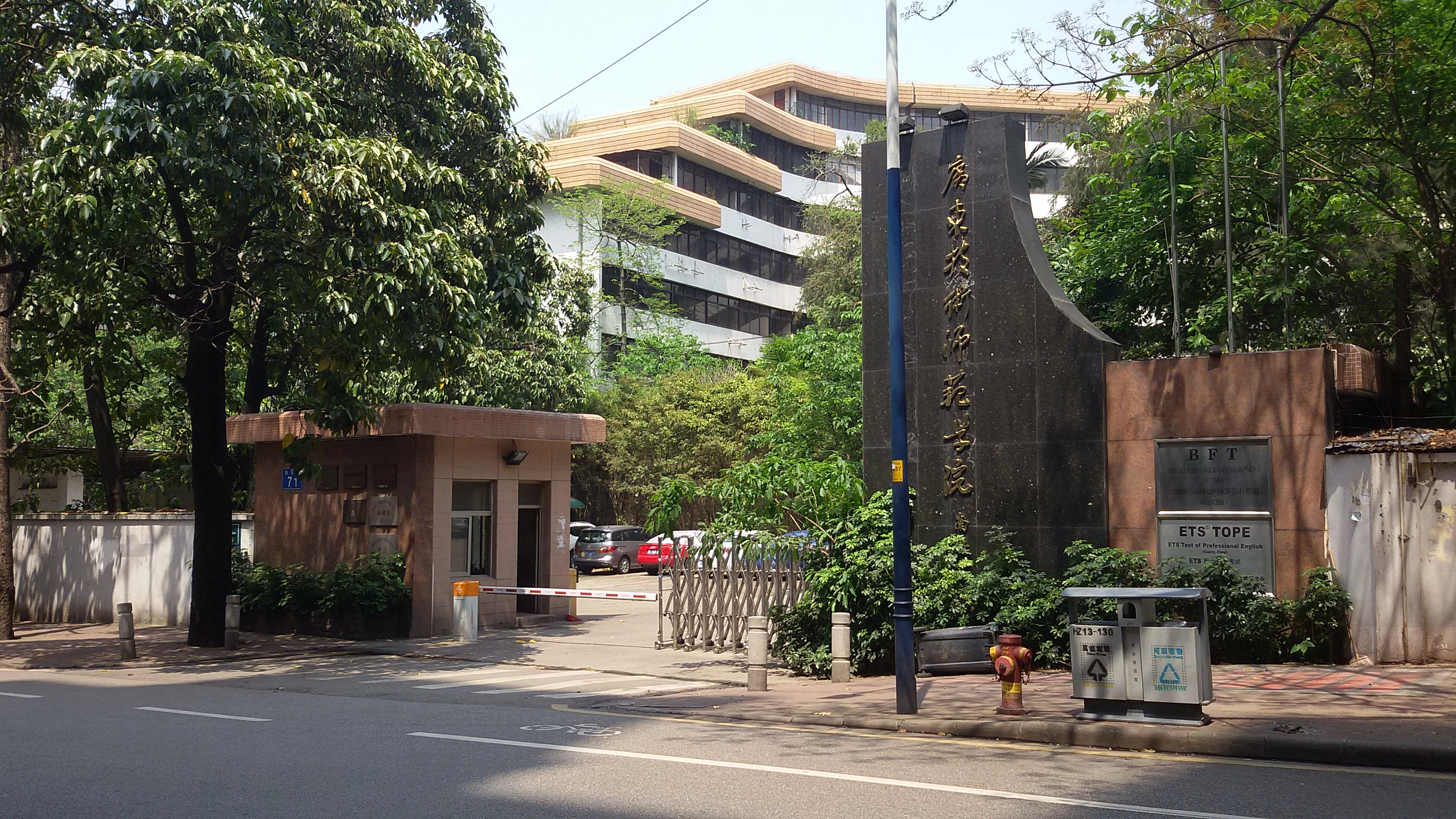
Guangdong Polytechnic Normal University (SOUTH BRANCH)

The Guangdong Polytechnic Normal University (GPNU; 广东技术师范大学; 'Guangdong Technical Normal University') is a provincial public university in Guangzhou, Guangdong, China. The university is affiliated with, and sponsored by the Guangdong Provincial People's Government. The university primarily serves to prepare teachers for careers instructing within vocational schools.

== History ==
Formerly known as Guangdong Institute of Nationalities (GDIN; 广东民族学院), the university was approved by the State Education Commission in October 1957. In 1961, the university's campus relocated to Hainan. The campus was totally closed due to the Cultural Revolution. It was reopened on April 25, 1974. In 1978, it was relocated to its current Guangzhou campus.

In 1998, the school was renamed to Guangdong Vocational Polytechnic Normal College (广东职业技术师范学院; 'Guangdong College for Vocational and Technical Teachers'). In 2002, the school merged with Guangdong School of Mechanical Engineering to form Guangdong Polytechnic Normal College. In 2005, the Guangdong Economic Management Institute and the Guangdong Finance and Trade Management Institute also merged into Guangdong Polytechnic Normal College. On December 4, 2018, the school was approved to change its name to Guangdong Polytechnic Normal University.

The school was approved as a master's degree authorization unit in 2006, and was approved as a Guangdong Province doctoral degree awarding unit in 2021. Currently, there are three first-level master's degree authorization points (covering 19 second-level discipline directions), one independent second-level master's degree authorization point, and two professional master's degree authorization points. It has 64 undergraduate majors, covering engineering, science, literature, management, education, economics, law, art, and other disciplines.

== Campus ==
As of July 2025, the school has an East Campus located in the Tianhe district of Guangzhou, West Campus also located in the Tianhe District, North Campus located in the Yuexiu District, Baiyun Campus located in Jianggao Town, Baiyun District, and Heyuan Campus in Xiandang Town, Dongyuan County, Heyuan.
