= He (surname) =

Chinese family name

Hé
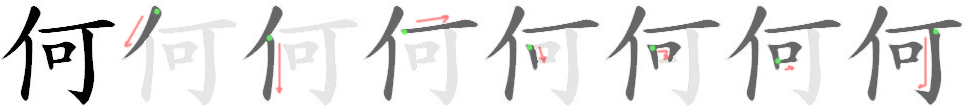
- Language: Chinese

Origin
- Region of origin: China

He

Chinese name
- Chinese: 何
Transcriptions
Standard Mandarin
- Hanyu Pinyin: Hé
- Wade–Giles: Ho^{2}
- IPA: [xɤ̌]
Yue: Cantonese
- Yale Romanization: Hòh
- Jyutping: Ho^{4}
- IPA: [hɔ˩]
Southern Min
- Hokkien POJ: Hô
Middle Chinese
- Middle Chinese: Ha
Old Chinese
- Baxter–Sagart (2014): *[g]ˤaj

Vietnamese name
- Vietnamese alphabet: Hà
- Chữ Hán: 何

Korean name
- Hangul: 하
- Hanja: 何
Transcriptions
- McCune–Reischauer: Ha

Japanese name
- Kanji: 何
- Kana: か
Transcriptions
- Revised Hepburn: Ka

He or Ho is the romanized transliteration of several Chinese surnames. According to a 2012 survey, 14 million people had Hé (何) listed as their surname, making it the 17th most common surname in Mainland China, a spot it retained in 2019. Hé was listed as the 21st most common surname in the Hundred Family Surnames. A common alternative spelling of the surname is Ho, which is the Mandarin Wade–Giles romanization and the Cantonese romanization of the Chinese family names.

In the Korean language, the equivalent surname is Ha (하). In the Vietnamese language, the equivalent surname is Hà.

Other less common family names that are romanized as He include 河 (Pinyin: Hé), 佫 (Pinyin: Hè), 赫 (Pinyin: Hè), and 和.

== History ==
The surname 何 is of diverse origins. The 2nd earliest originates from Han, the name of a kingdom during the Warring States period, and the Jiang clan of Yandi.

After the barbarian Xianbei became Han Chinese, a group of originally Heba surnamed Xianbei took the surname 何.

Numerous Boat Dwellers have the 何 surname too.

== Romanization ==
Char.		Mandarin		Cantonese	
S.	T.	Pinyin	Wade–Giles	Jyutping	HK Gov't
何		Hé	Ho^{2}	Ho4	Ho
贺	賀	Hè	Ho^{4}	Ho6	Ho
河		Hé	Ho^{2}	Ho4	Ho
佫		Hè	Ho^{4}	Hok6	
赫		Hè	Ho^{4}	Haak1 Hak1	Hak

== Notable people ==
=== Academia ===
- He Jifeng (何積豐) Chinese computer scientist
- He Zehui (何泽慧), Chinese nuclear physicist
- David Ho (何大一), Chinese American AIDS researcher
- Mae-Wan Ho (1941–2016), Hong Kong-born geneticist biophysicist
- Tin-Lun Ho (born 1951), Chinese-American theoretical physicist
- Xuhua He (何旭华, born 1979), Chinese mathematician
- He Zuoxiu Chinese physicist member of Chinese Academy of Science

=== Politics ===
- Solomon Hochoy: governor of Trinidad and Tobago
- Albert Ho (何俊仁), Hong Kong Legislative Council member with the Democratic Party
- Cyd Ho (何秀蘭), Hong Kong Legislative Council member with The Frontier
- Edmund Ho (何厚鏵), Chief Executive of the Macau Special Administrative Region of the People's Republic of China
- He Depu (何德普) dissident in the People's Republic of China
- Ho Chih-chin (何志欽), Minister of Finance of the Republic of China (2006–2008)
- Ho Chi-kung (何啟功), Deputy Minister of Health and Welfare of the Republic of China
- He Siyuan (何思源): mayor of Beijing
- Ho Feng-Shan (何鳳山), diplomat who saved a large number of Jews during World War II, known as "China's Schindler"
- Ho Mei-yueh (何美玥), Minister of the Council for Economic Planning and Development of the Republic of China (2007–2008)
- Ho Pei-shan (何佩珊), Deputy Secretary-General of the Executive Yuan of the Republic of China
- Ho Peng Kee (何炳基), Singaporean legal academic and former politician
- Hou Kok Chung (何国忠), Malaysian Deputy Minister for Higher Education

=== Finance ===
- He Qiaonü (何巧女) entrepreneur and philanthropist
- Ho Ching (何晶), executive director of Temasek Holdings and wife of senior minister Lee Hsien Loong
- Ho Kwon Ping, executive chairman of Banyan Tree Holdings
- Stanley Ho (何鴻燊), Hong Kong and Macau businessman
- Robert Hotung (何東), Hong Kong businessman and philanthropist

=== Filmography and entertainment ===
- Keishla He (何嘉裟), Puerto Rican social media personality
- He Meitian (何美钿), Hong Kong actress and former gymnast
- He Ping (何平), Chinese film director
- He Ying Ying (何盈莹), Singaporean actress
- He Yu (何宜谦), Chinese actor
- He Zhuoyan (何琢言) Chinese actress and singer
- A. Kitman Ho (何傑民) Hong Kong-born American film producer
- Daniel Ho, American musician, composer and producer specializing in Slack-key guitar, ukulele, Hawaiian music.
- Denise Ho (何韻詩), Hong Kong singer and actress
- Dennis Trillo (also known as Dennis Ho), Filipino actor
- Don Ho (何大來), Hawaiian musician and entertainer.
- Godfrey Ho, Hong Kong–based movie director best known for his Ninja films
- Hoku Ho, American musician and actress
- Josie Ho (何超儀), singer and actress from Hong Kong
- Ho Ping (何平), Taiwanese film director
- He Jiong (何炅), Chinese singer and actor
- Ho Ho Ying (何和应), Singaporean artist

=== Others ===
- Siobhán Haughey (何詩蓓) Hong Kong swimmer
- He Bingjiao (何冰娇) Chinese badminton player
- He Jin (何進) Eastern Han dynasty general
- Empress He (Han Dynasty) (何皇后) Second wife of Emperor Ling of Han, sister of He Jin
- Empress He (Tang Dynasty) (何皇后) Wife of Emperor Zhaozong of Tang
- He Jianshi (何剑士), Chinese cartoonist
- Kevin He, Chinese Canadian ice hockey player
- He Kexin (何可欣), Chinese Olympic gymnast
- He Luli (何鲁丽) Chinese doctor and politician
- Sui He (何穗) Chinese fashion model
- He Pingping (何平平), one of the world's smallest men, from Inner Mongolia
- He Qifang (何其芳), Chinese poet and essayist
- Qiu Xia He (何秋霞), Chinese pipa player
- He Xuntian (何训田), modern Chinese composer, famous for his compositions for Dadawa
- He Yanwen (何燕雯), Chinese female rower
- He Ying (何影), Chinese athlete and archer
- He Yingqin (何應欽), senior Kuomintang general
- He Yong (何勇), Chinese rock musician
- He Zhi Wen (何誌文), Chinese-born Spanish male table tennis player
- Ho Fuk Yan (何福仁), teacher, Chinese author and poet in Hong Kong
- James C. Ho, Taiwanese-born American federal judge
- Teck-Hua Ho (何德华), Singaporean academic
- Ho Yuen Hoe (何润好), Chinese humanitarian and Venerable Bhikkhuni

== See also ==
- List of common Chinese surnames
