= The True Record =

Chinese illustrated magazine (1912–1913)

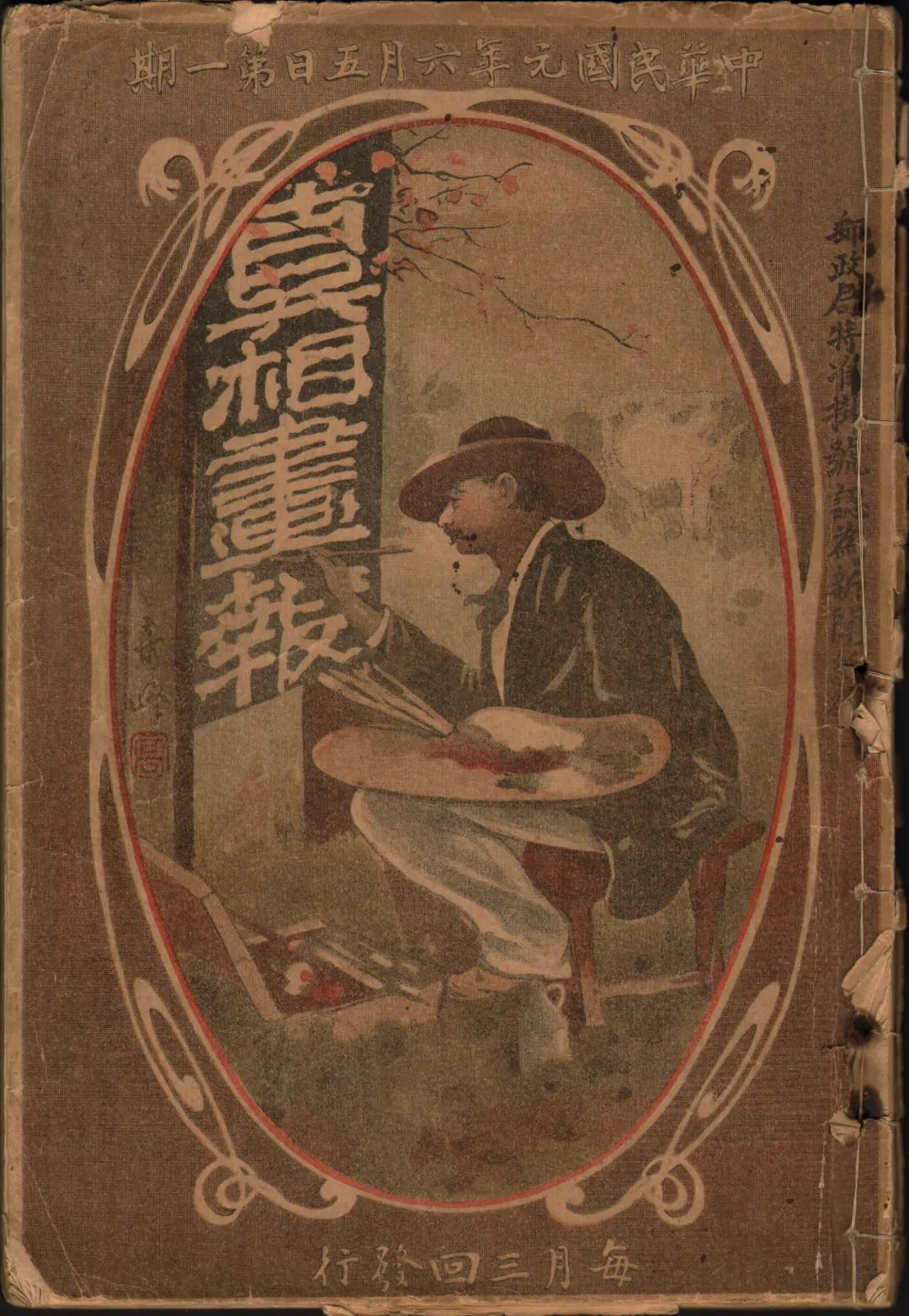
- The first issue of The True Record
- Native name
- Traditional Chinese: 真相畫報
- Simplified Chinese: 真相画报
Transcriptions
Standard Mandarin
- Hanyu Pinyin: Zhēnxiāng Huàbào
- Wade–Giles: Chen^{1}hsiang^{1} Hua^{4}pao^{4}
- Editor: Gao Qifeng
- Categories: Art, politics, current events
- Frequency: Irregular
- Publisher: Aesthetic Institute
- First issue: 5 June 1912; 114 years ago
- Final issue: March or April 1913
- Company: The True Record Press
- Country: Republic of China
- Based in: Shanghai
- Language: Vernacular written Chinese, with English captions

The True Record (traditional Chinese: 真相畫報; simplified Chinese: 真相画报; pinyin: Zhēnxiāng Huàbào) was a pictorial magazine published in Shanghai, China, between June 1912 and March or April 1913. The magazine was established by brothers Gao Qifeng and Gao Jianfu as the nascent Republic of China was seeking to develop a new culture after centuries of Qing rule. It sought to monitor the new republic, report the welfare of the people, promote socialism, and distribute world knowledge. Under the Gaos and fellow editor Huang Binhong, the magazine published seventeen issues and expanded its reach from China through Southeast Asia and to Hawaii. Fervently supportive of Sun Yat-sen and the nationalist movement, the magazine was critical of Provisional President Yuan Shikai and closed during a time when he was consolidating his power.

Produced using a combination of copperplate printing and collotype, The True Record featured colourful covers as well as numerous photographs and illustrations. Between its pages, seven types of imagery were included, from paintings and photographs to satirical manhua. Articles covered such topics as traditional and modern art, current events, technological innovations, and politics; works of creative writing were also included. Essays called for the creation of a "new national art", as well as the expansion of the national economy through industrial art and other means. Despite having been published for less than one year, The True Record has been described as one of the most important illustrated magazines of the first years of the Republic of China.

== History ==
=== Background ===
In the late 19th and early 20th centuries, the Qing dynasty – which had ruled China since the 17th century – faced growing opposition from various revolutionary groups. After a series of failed uprisings, in October 1911 an uprising broke out in Wuchang that spread through the country. Yuan Shikai, the General of the Beiyang Army, was initially tasked with ending the rebellion. Ultimately, he allied with the rebels, and negotiated the abdication of Emperor Puyi. The Republic of China was proclaimed on 1 January 1912, with Sun Yat-sen, the leader of the Tongmenghui, a major resistance group, as its provisional president. (Note: At the time, Emperor Puyi still sat on the throne. He did not formally abdicate until 12 February 1912 (Spence 2013, p. 263).)

As the nascent nation sought a new culture, the philosopher and revolutionary Cai Yuanpei advocated for using aesthetic education to cultivate awareness of its needs. Nineteen magazines began publication in this era, collectively serving to capitalize on demand for new, modern materials. Unlike earlier Chinese publications, which often produced using woodblock printing on soft paper and bound in plain paper or cloth, these new magazines used modern printing technology and illustrated covers. The True Record was one such magazine, though according to Julia F. Andrews of Ohio State University, it was characterized more by its political mission than the commercial enterprises of its contemporaries.

=== Establishment ===
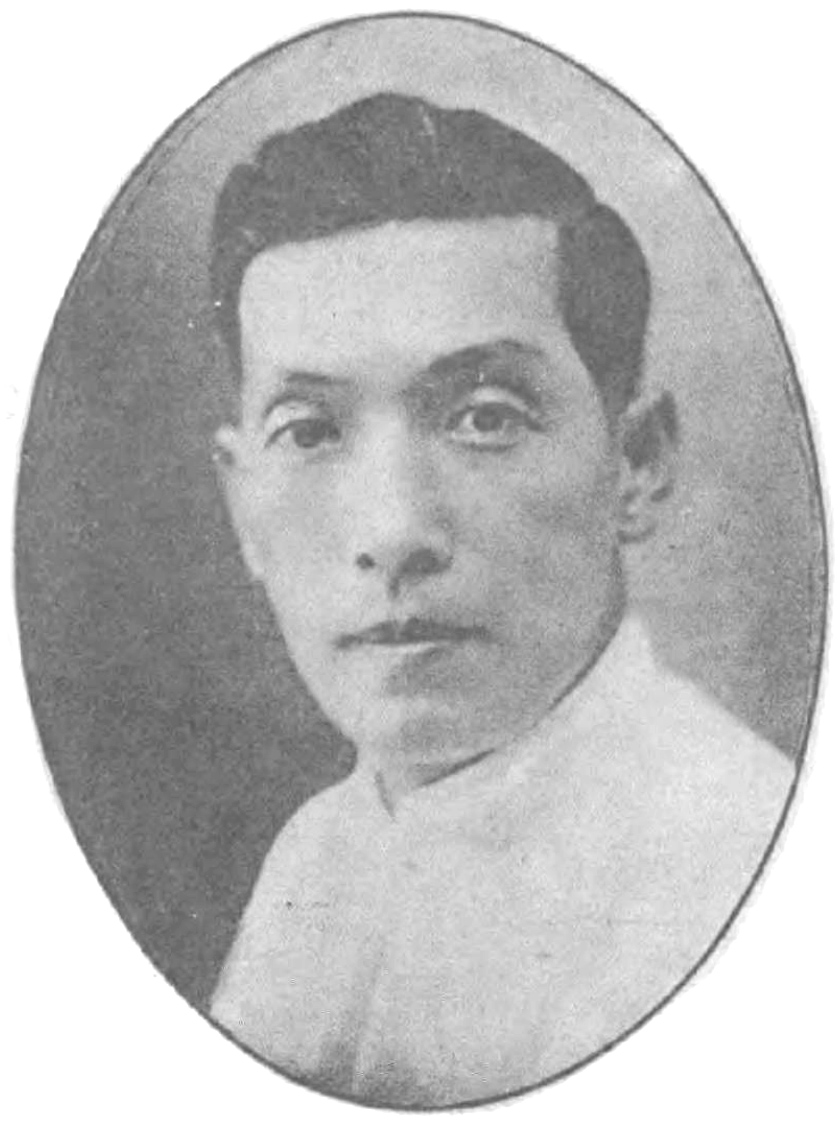
Gao Qifeng, editor-in-chief of The True Record

The True Record was established by Gao Qifeng and Gao Jianfu, artists from Guangdong who, while studying in Japan in the late 1900s, had joined the Tongmenghui. They returned to China in 1908, with Gao Jianfu leading a revolutionary cell that was responsible for several assassinations. Gao Qifeng became the editor-in-chief of the new magazine and Gao Jianfu and Huang Binhong became supporting editors. Also involved were several alumni of the Journal of Current Pictorial including He Jianshi and Zheng Leiquan (鄭磊泉), who had used their manhua (comics) to criticize the Qing dynasty. Another artist, Kwan Wai-nung, travelled from Hong Kong to contribute to the publication. Further contributions came from Chen Shuren, a colleague of the Gaos in Japan, and Xu Beihong, an employee of their bookstore.

Headquartered at No. 4 Road, Huifu Lane, Shanghai, The True Record provided the mailing address of 45 Wei Foo Lee (Foochow Road) (Note: Also known as Fuzhou Road (福州路); this street was renowned as a center of the book trade in Shanghai (Warra 1999, p. 63).) on its cover. In February 1913, operations moved to Middle Section No. 84, Chessboard Street, also in Shanghai. (Note: Shanghai, a major port, was at a crossroads of western and eastern cultures; it thus attracted young intellectuals and progressives from throughout China (Pan & Xu 2011, p. 131). By the 1910s, it had gained a reputation for modernity and cosmopolitanism (Warra 1999, p. 61).) Publication was handled by the Aesthetic Institute, a combined gallery, exhibition hall, and publishing house that also sold reproductions of Chinese and western paintings. The Commerce Culture Print Shop did the printing, using a combination of copperplate printing and collotype.

Some photography for The True Record was provided by the Guangdong-based China Photo Team (中华写真队), which had been established by Sun with the support of the provincial government to cover republican war efforts; funding for the magazine's publication has also been alleged to have come from the government. After The True Record published its second issue, the China Photo Team – headquartered at Provincial Capital Bund No. 2 Road in Guangzhou – was rebranded the Guangdong Branch of the True Record Press. Distribution of the magazine was handled by both the Shanghai and Guangdong offices.

=== Publication ===
The first edition of The True Record was published on 5 June 1912. It was prefaced by introductions from Li Huaishuang (李怀霜), Xie Yingbo (谢英伯), and Hu Hanmin, all of whom were Tongmenghui members. In his contribution, Li introduced Gao Qifeng, highlighting his revolutionary activities, and provided the magazine's mission statement: to monitor the new republic, report the welfare of the people, promote socialism, and distribute world knowledge. (Note: Such a mission was reflective of Sun Yat-sen's Three Principles of the People (Floriani 2023, p. 225).) Initially, The True Record was scheduled to publish a new issue every ten days, with a target of ten-thousand words per issue. The price was a quarter yuan (equivalent to ¥43 in 2019) per copy, or seven yuan (equivalent to ¥1,200 in 2019) for a one-year subscription – expected to be 36 issues. This schedule was ultimately not realized and publication was irregular.

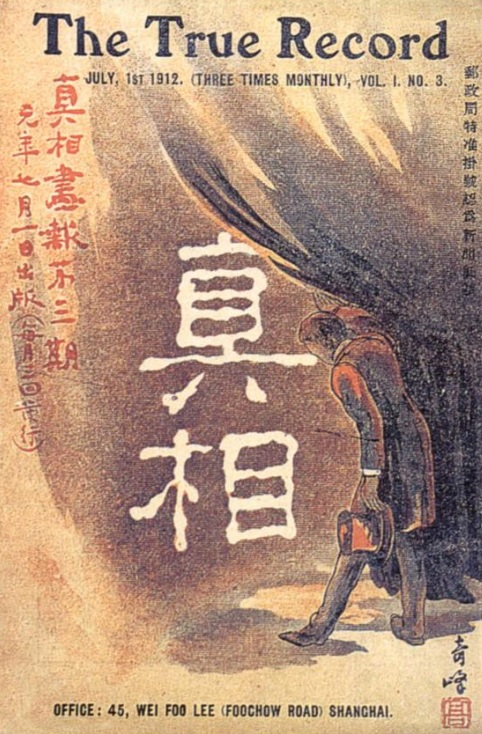
Beginning with the third issue, The True Record included its English-language title.

Over time, The True Record expanded its reach. Initially distributed throughout China via its offices in Shanghai and Guangdong, by the fourth issue a branch office had been established at the Cao Wanfeng Bookstore in Singapore, serving Southeast Asia. Distribution had reached Honolulu, Hawaii, by the seventh issue. (Note: Sun Yat-sen had spent time in Hawaii before and during his exile, with six recorded visits. He had established the Revive China Society in Honolulu in 1894, and by 1912 Hawaii still hosted numerous Chinese nationalists and revolutionaries (Lum & Lum 1999, pp. vi–vii)) As the magazine expanded its distribution networks, it sought to internationalize. With the third issue, the English-language title The True Record was provided alongside a mailing address. The subtitle "Illustrated Magazine" was included beginning with the fourth issue. Captions were provided in English and Chinese. (Note: Pan & Xu (2011, p. 133) write that this bilingual approach had several benefits: it suited the needs of Shanghai, which had a large Western population; it facilitated efforts to reach international audiences; and it allowed Chinese culture and art to be shared with non-Chinese readers.)

=== Closure ===
In February 1912, President Sun had ceded leadership of the republic to Yuan, honouring an earlier agreement. As the new provisional president consolidated his power, he began to suppress the Nationalist Party – which dominated the 1912 National Assembly election – and curtail its activities, with publications deemed too critical of his government censored. In March 1913, Song Jiaoren was assassinated at Shanghai station, with Yuan rumoured to have been involved; (Note: Yuan was widely blamed for the assassination at the time. Several of the persons implicated (such as Ying Guixin and Zhao Bingjun) were ultimately assassinated, and Yuan was consequently never officially implicated (Spence 2013, pp. 266–267; Dillon 2021, p. 164).) a nationalist leader, Song had broad popular support and had openly opposed Yuan.

The True Record closed during this period, publishing its seventeenth and final issue in March or April 1913. Sources differ as to the reason. The comics scholar Wendy Siuyi Wong writes that the magazine was banned; this is supported by Tang Hongfeng of Beijing Normal University, who suggests that its implication of Yuan and Zhao Bingjun in Song's assassination was the deciding factor. The art historian Christina Chu describes the magazine as closing after government funding was pulled; this is supported by Andrews, who notes that the magazine's lavish production values would have limited its commercial viability without subsidies, as well as the art historian Ralph Croizier, who writes that the magazine had difficulty attracting advertisers.

Many of the magazine's staff left Shanghai after its closure. Zheng fled to Hong Kong, dying there by the end of the decade. Kwan returned to Hong Kong, where he used the tiger-painting techniques he had learned from the Gaos to advertise Tiger Balm. Gao Qifeng may have undergone a self-imposed exile in Japan, where he had studied the previous decade, returning some time later. (Note: In Grove Art Online, Tian S. Liang writes that Gao returned to China in early 1914 (Liang 2022), while the author Cai Dengshan asserts that he only returned after Yuan Shikai's death in 1916 (Cai 2023). However, covering the life of Gao Qifeng for the Southern Metropolis Daily, Wang (2008) notes that this exile narrative is not universally accepted.) Such flights were common among nationalists, with Sun escaping to Japan in August 1913.

== Description and content ==
The True Record was printed in black ink on thin acid paper. Covers used higher quality paper, allowing the printing of half-tone colour illustrations. Some issues featured colour insets and many contained fold-outs that could be removed for display. (Note: For example, the first issue offered three panoramas of Wuhan, respectively depicting Hanyang and Hankou, the Han and Yangtze Rivers, and Wuchang (Roberts 2013, p. 59).) Issues were 18 by 27 centimetres (7.1 in × 10.6 in) in size, and ranged in length from fifty to eighty pages.

=== Imagery ===
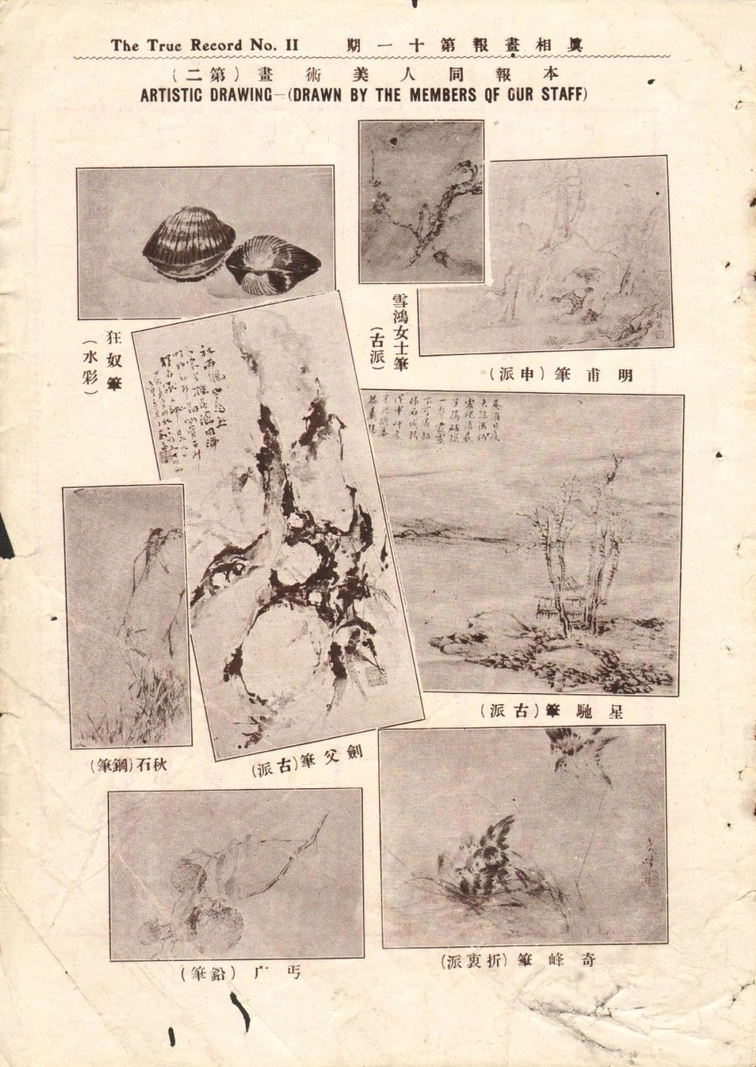
Drawings by staff members, featured in Issue 11 of The True Record

The Gao brothers believed that pictorials could best serve to educate the populace, as contemporary literacy rates were low and thus images had further reach than text. Consequently, imagery was extensively used in The True Record. In the first issue, the magazine enumerated seven types of images that it sought to publish: historical painting, art painting, photographic paintings of geology, parodic paintings, photographic paintings of current affairs, photographic paintings of scenic spots, and paintings of current affairs. (Note: Original: ｢历史画, 美术画, 地势写真画, 滑稽画, 时事写真画, 名胜写真画和时事画｣. Translation by Liang (2022).)

The use of thick paper allowed The True Record to feature extensive colour on its covers. Subjects were diverse, but often involved individuals uncovering a truth. The cover of the first edition depicted a young artist, garbed in clothing reflective of a Western bohemian, sitting on a stool and leaning toward a banner bearing the title of the magazine. The cover of the third issue, published on 1 July 1912, depicted a man in a western suit pulling a curtain back, revealing the Chinese word 真相 ("truth"). The final issue of The True Record depicted a man in Western garb, looking into a mirror and seeing the spirit of a Mandarin; Tang suggests that this was intended to criticize Yuan Shikai. Many of these covers were produced by Gao Qifeng.

The pages of The True Record contained numerous paintings by the Gaos and other artists, with two issues including sections dedicated to the staff artists. Tigers were commonly depicted, allegorically calling for boldness and bravery in the nation-building process; lions and eagles, favourites of Gao Qifeng that were understood to reflect a revolutionary spirit, also appeared. Political manhua, satirizing topics that ranged from political parties and corruption to misers and social parasites, were included in many issues. Some are signed, generally with pseudonyms, while others are uncredited. (Note: The magazine's primary political cartoonists He Jianshi, Zheng Nuquan, and Ma Xingchi (马星驰) used more than a dozen pen-names between them (Pan & Xu 2011, p. 134).)

Almost two hundred photographs (Note: Chinese has several terms for photography, including 摄影 (shèyǐng) and 照片 (zhàopiàn). The True Record used the term 寫真 (xiězhēn), which Floriani (2023, p. 225) translates as "transcription of truth".) were included in The True Record throughout its run, including thirty in the first issue alone. The political activities of Sun Yat-sen were covered extensively, with a particular focus on his interactions with the common person. Military subjects such as field exercises and the naval fleet were frequently depicted as well. International stories also featured, with three issues (Note: Issues 12, 13, and 14.) including coverage of the Balkan Wars.

=== Text ===
Art was frequently discussed in the articles of The True Record. In essays, the Gaos called for the creation of a "new national art", based on the synthesis of traditional Chinese painting with foreign art, as well as improvements in art education. Huang decried the abstraction of literati approaches to landscape painting and urged greater verisimilitude. Chen, over the course of fifteen issues, serialized his translation of a Japanese book on new painting methods derived from western traditions. Excluding certain chapters, such as discussions of watercolour, his adaptation also expanded its coverage to include references to ancient masters such as Wang Wei and Wu Daozi.

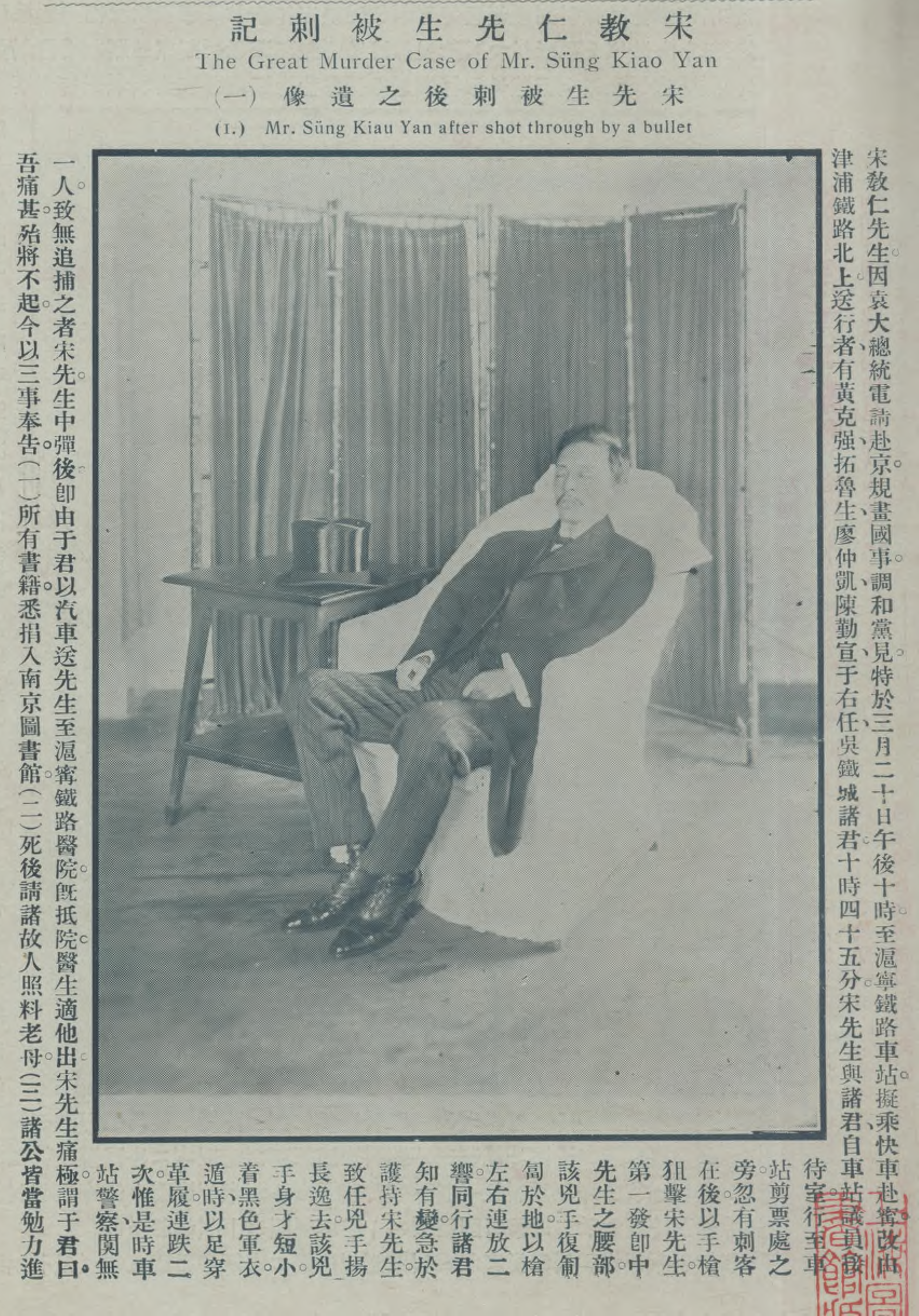
Coverage of Song Jiaoren's assassination

Other articles explored the history of art and artists. Gao Jianfu, for instance, discussed Ju Chao – a relative of his own teacher, Ju Lian – in a 1913 issue, praising his graceful brushstrokes and vibrant colours. Huang detailed the history of painting in the Song and two other dynasties over the course of more than twelve instalments. Three issues provided a comparative overview of ink and oil painting in different countries, presenting images of representative works along with introductions to their artists. (Note: One article in this series, by Chen, introduced the work of the painter of animals Edwin Landseer (Croizier 2023, p. 70).) Elsewhere, articles explored the practice of art globally, or provided insight into ceramics and pencil drawing. Several works of creative fiction, both prose and poetry, were also included.

To fulfil its social mandate, The True Record also offered news and social commentary. These generally promoted the perspectives of the nationalist movement, such that the magazine has been described as its mouthpiece. The advancement of the nation was often discussed. One article argued that technology news could promote innovation and stimulate social progress (Note: This article was translated from a Japanese source and serialized between Issue 1 and Issue 8, non-consecutively (Warra 1999, p. 69).) and indeed new technologies from waterbikes to armaments were featured. Others urged economic nationalism and the expansion of industrial art or condemned the practice of miserly living.

Sun Yat-sen featured prominently in the magazine, which drew parallels between the nationalist leader and the Hongwu Emperor, who had risen from the peasantry to lead China. He was depicted as interacting extensively with others in society, distinguishing him from the earlier Qing emperors. Several articles detailed individuals who had fought against the Qing dynasty, such as Shi Jianru, who had attempted to kill the Qing governor of Guangdong in 1900, and Bai Yukun, who had been killed in the Luanzhou Uprising. Some articles, such as "Chu Ziwen Destroys His Family to Help the Country", (Note: Original: ｢楚子文毁家纾国难｣.) extolled the virtues of persons who continued to contribute to the nationalist cause; it asked, "the country is the family. If the country does not exist, where is the family?". (Note: Original: ｢国即是家, 国之不存, 家于何有｣)

Initially, nationalist publications such as The True Record had supported Yuan and his Beiyang government. However, as it became increasingly authoritarian, the president received extensive criticism. Problems such as an ineffective government and weak bureaucracy were highlighted. This peaked in 1913, when The True Record published an article detailing Song's assassination. Two photographs of Song's corpse accompanied the article, one clothed and the other nude from the waist up, which Gu Zheng of Fudan University describes as consciously included to increase public outrage and highlight the cruelty of the killing. Yuan, meanwhile, was included in a list of persons related to the killing; his photograph depicted him not in the military uniform of the revolutionary, but adornments of one serving the Qing.

== Impact and analysis ==
Pan Yaochang and Xu Li of the Shanghai Academy of Fine Arts argue that, by turning to the international world of art, The True Record drew the vitality needed to "push the culture and art of Shanghai to a new height"; (Note: Original ｢将上海这座都市的文化艺术推向一个崭新的高｣.) at the same time, they write that its ideas contributed to the concepts of aesthetic education that marked the May Fourth Movement. Gao Qifeng, Gao Jianfu, and Chen Shuren later expanded upon their concept of "national art", developing what has become known as the Lingnan school of painting by blending Chinese, Japanese, and western techniques.

In the realm of publication, The True Record was one of the first illustrated magazines in the Republic of China, as well as its first art journal. Liang Desuo, an editor of the pictorial magazine The Young Companion, considered it to be the beginning of photography in Chinese pictorial magazines; photographs had appeared in domestic publications as early as the mid-1900s, but without photozincography their use had been limited. In her history of photography in China, Claire Roberts describes The True Record as one of the most important illustrated magazines published in the first years of the republic.

The magazine's usage of photography has drawn extensive discussion. Yi Gu of the University of Toronto writes that The True Record is among the best examples of the process through which photography was used side-by-side with other forms of imagery, including prints, manhua, and reproductions of paintings to create new understandings of "truth" in Chinese visual culture. (Note: Highlighting one article that combined a sixteen-image series depicting a moulting cicada with taxonomic discussion of the insects as well as poems that had accompanied paintings of them, Gu (2013, p. 133) notes that the magazine "accentuate[s] the positive potential of photography" while assimilating it into the narrative truth offered by pre-modern Chinese painting. This, she suggests, is reinforced by the covers of the first two editions, which respectively depicted a painter and a photographer (Gu 2013, p. 134).) Other scholars have prioritized the magazine's photographic content. Citing its coverage of revolutionaries, the communication scholar Xia Yi of Nanjing Xiaozhuang University argues that The True Record positioned photography as a more timely and objective medium. Pan and Xu note that, by employing photography, the magazine was better able to report current affairs; while earlier publications such as the 19th-century Dianshizhai Pictorial (Note: This magazine was a supplement to the newspaper Shen Bao (Pan & Xu 2011, p. 134).) had contained some news coverage, they relied on hand-drawn illustrations and thus their photography tended to place greater emphasis on everyday life.

== Works cited ==
- 【广东美术百年21大家】高奇峰 [21 Fine Arts Masters from Guangdong in the Past 100 Years: Gao Qifeng] (in Chinese). Guangdong Museum. 24 September 2017. Archived from the original on 3 December 2023.
- Andrews, Julia F. (2018). "Persuading with Pictures: Cover Art and The Ladies' Journal (1915–1931)". In Hockx, Michel; Judge, Joan; Mittler, Barbara (eds.). Women and the Periodical Press in China's Long Twentieth Century. Cambridge: Cambridge University Press. pp. 21–56. doi:10.1017/9781108304085.004. ISBN 978-1-108-30408-5.
- Andrews, Julia F.; Shen, Kuiyi (2012). The Art of Modern China. Berkeley, California: University of California Press. ISBN 978-0-520-23814-5.
- Cai Dengshan (蔡登山) (25 August 2023). 番禺高奇峰：未尽其才的"岭南三杰 [Panyu Gao Qifeng: The "Three Heroes of Lingnan" Who Did Not Use His Talents to Their Fullest]. Dute News (in Chinese). Shenzhen Media Group.
- Chu, Christina (1998). "The Lingnan School and Its Followers: Radical Innovation in Southern China". In Andrews, Julia Frances; Shen, Kuiyi (eds.). A Century in Crisis: Modernity and Tradition in the Art of Twentieth-century China. New York: Guggenheim Museum. pp. 40–79. ISBN 978-0-8109-6909-4.
- Cochran, Sherman (2006). Chinese Medicine Men: Consumer Culture in China and Southeast Asia. Cambridge, Massachusetts: Harvard University Press. ISBN 978-0-674-02161-7.
- Croizier, Ralph (2023). Art and Revolution in Modern China: The Lingnan (Cantonese) School of Painting, 1906–1951. Berkeley, California: University of California Press. ISBN 978-0-520-33696-4.
- Dai, Jianbing; Wang, Yongyan (2019). Hebei Women's Normal Education Pioneers: One Century's Fragrant Trace of Wisdom. Translated by Sumin Zhang. Newcastle upon Tyne: Cambridge Scholars. ISBN 978-1-5275-2209-1.
- Dillon, Michael (2021). China: A Modern History. London: I. B. Tauris. ISBN 978-0-7556-0188-2.
- Floriani, Giulia Pra (2023). "Photographic Portraits of Leaders of the 1911 Revolution: The Promise of Historical Rupture in the Chinese Republican Press". In Satterthwaite, Tim; Thacker, Andrew (eds.). Magazines and Modern Identities: Global Cultures of the Illustrated Press, 1880–1945. London: Bloomsbury. pp. 223–237. ISBN 978-1-350-27865-3.
- Gu, Yi (2013). "What's in a Name? Photography and the Reinvention of Visual Truth in China, 1840–1911". The Art Bulletin. 95: 120–138. doi:10.1080/00043079.2013.10786109.
- Hong Lanxin (洪岚昕) and Li Zihua (黎子华) (8 August 2022). 广东美术馆藏岭南画派文献系列（一）：《真相画报》 [Documents of the Lingnan School of Painting at the Guangdong Museum of Art, Series (I): The True Record] (in Chinese). Guangdong Museum. Archived from the original on 21 September 2024.
- Liang, Tiang S. (9 June 2022). "Zhenxiang huabao [The True Record]". Grove Art Online. doi:10.1093/oao/9781884446054.013.90000138520.
- Liu, Yiwen (2019). "Witnessing Death: The Circulation of Lu Xun's Postmortem Image". Trans-Asia Photography. 9 (2). doi:10.1215/215820251_9-2-204. hdl:2027/spo.7977573.0009.204.
- Lum, Yansheng Ma; Lum, Raymond Mun Kong (1999). Sun Yat-sen in Hawaii: Activities and Supporters. Honolulu: University of Hawaii Press. ISBN 978-0-8248-2179-1.
- McKenna, Amy (3 October 2023). "Chinese Revolution 1911–1912". Encyclopaedia Britannica. Archived from the original on 14 February 2024.
- Nishigami, Masaru (2018). 中国絵画通史の構築と「変」の概念――黄賓虹（1865－1955）著『古画微』をめぐって [Providing a General History of Chinese Painting and the Concept of "Change": On "Guhuawei" by Huang Binhong (1865–1955)] (PDF). Bulletin of the Graduate School of Social and Cultural Systems (in Japanese) (15): 1–18.
- Pan Yaochang (潘耀昌) and Xu Li (徐立) (2011). 上海早期都市文艺先锋 —《真相画报》 [Shanghai's Early Urban Art Pioneer – "The True Record"] (PDF). Journal of Shanghai University (in Chinese): 131–140. Archived from the original (PDF) on 19 September 2024.
- Roberts, Claire (2013). Photography and China. London: Reaktion Books. ISBN 978-1-78023-247-8.
- Spence, Johnathan D. (2013). The Search for Modern China (3rd ed.). New York: W.W. Norton & Company. ISBN 978-0-393-93451-9.
- Tang Honfeng (唐宏峰) (2018). Uncanny，或者'故鬼重来'——近代中国的镜像图像与视错觉 [Uncanny, or 'Old Ghosts Coming Again": Mirror Images and Visual Illusions in Modern China]. Modern China Studies (in Chinese). 25 (2): 113–140.
- Tao Xiaojun (陶小军) and Yang Xinmin (杨心珉) (2017). 从"折衷"到"现代"：抗战寓澳时期高剑父绘画思想的嬗变 [From 'Compromise' to 'Modernity': The Evolution of Gao Jianfu's Painting during the Anti-Japanese War in Macao] (PDF). Jiangsu Social Sciences (in Chinese) (5): 208–215.
- Wakeman, Frederic (2003). Spymaster: Dai Li and the Chinese Secret Service. Berkeley, California: University of California Press. ISBN 978-0-520-23407-9.
- Wang Jingjing (汪晶晶) (6 November 2008). 高奇峰 谁堪画圣之名 谁享最风光葬礼 [Gao Qifeng: Who Deserves the Title of the 'Painting Saint', Who has the Most Splendid Funeral]. Southern Metropolis Daily (in Chinese). Archived from the original on 5 January 2024. (via Guangzhou Digital Library)
- Warra, Carrie (1999). "Invention, Industry, Art: The Commercialization of Culture in Republican Art Magazines". In Cochran, Sherman (ed.). Inventing Nanjing Road: Commercial Culture in Shanghai, 1900–1945. Ithaca, New York: Cornell East Asia Program. pp. 61–90. ISBN 978-1-885445-63-6.
- Wong, Wendy Siuyi (2002). Hong Kong Comics. New York: Princeton Architectural Press. ISBN 978-1-56898-269-4.
- Xia Yi (夏羿) (2017). 清末民初国人对摄影媒介的认知 [The Chinese People's Understanding of the Medium of Photography in the Late Qing Dynasty and Early Republic of China] (PDF). Jiangsu Social Sciences (in Chinese) (1): 200–204.
- Zhu Wanzhang (朱万章) (31 July 2017). 高奇峰《松猿图》：画海横舟 劈波至勇 [Gao Qifeng's "Pine and Monkey": Painting a Boat Crossing the Sea and Bravely Cutting through the Waves]. rmzxb.com.cn (in Chinese). Chinese People's Political Consultative Conference. Archived from the original on 16 March 2021.
