= Paseo del Jaguar =

Paseo del Jaguar (Spanish: "Path of the Jaguar") is a proposed interconnected system of refuges and conservation corridors running from the United States through Mexico and Central America into South America. The purpose of the Path, proposed by jaguar expert Alan Rabinowitz, is to allow jaguars to travel and inter-breed throughout their historical areas. The Panthera organization actively develops these corridors through their Jaguar Corridor Initiative.

== Description ==
The corridors created by this program allow for the natural roaming behavior of the jaguar and safeguard them from ranchers and farmers by giving jaguars natural cover, letting them avoid human activities as much as possible. These corridors in some cases are as small as a line of trees along a fence; they do not have to be something large, they simply have to be enough to link habitats together in continuous ground cover. A key component of the Path of the Jaguar is the creation of small preserves spaced along the corridor at key points. These preserves are just large enough for a jaguar to stay and hunt in for a day or two, offering an alternative to the risky endeavor of hunting livestock.

=== Potential connections ===
There are many potential connections between current jaguar habitats. A 2010 study by Rabinowitz suggested 182 of them, 44 of which are in danger of being eliminated by human use.

== See also ==
- Amphibian and reptile tunnel
- Habitat corridor
- North American jaguar
- South American jaguar
