= Pan Dawei =

Chinese artist

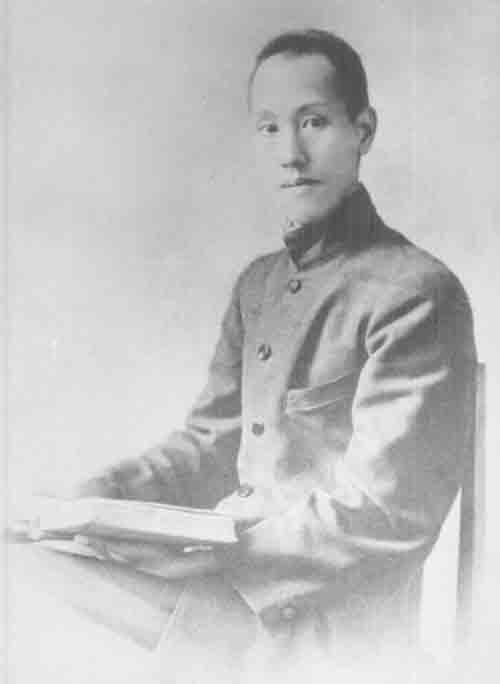
Pan Dawei

Pan Dawei (Chinese: 潘达微; 1881–1929) was a Chinese artist and political radical.

As a journalist, Pan was one of the first political cartoonists in China and a member of the Tongmenghui. He worked with He Jianshi and others to create Journal of Current Pictorial, which published these cartoons. They showed support for the 1911 Revolution against the Qing dynasty.

As an artist, he worked with Huang Banruo and Deng Erya to found the Hong Kong branch of the Guangdong Association for the Study of Chinese Paintings. He worked in the art department of the Nanyang Brothers Tobacco Company, creating calendar advertisement posters. He associated with several other poster artists, including Zhou Bosheng, Zheng Mantuo, Li Mubai, and Xie Zhiguang.

== 72 Martyrs ==
During the Second Guangzhou Uprising on 27 April 1911, Pan buried the 72 martyrs of the uprising on Red Flower Ridge (later renamed Yellow Flower Ridge). He is buried in the Huanghuagang 72 Martyrs Cemetery in Guangzhou.
