= Alan Rabinowitz =

American zoologist

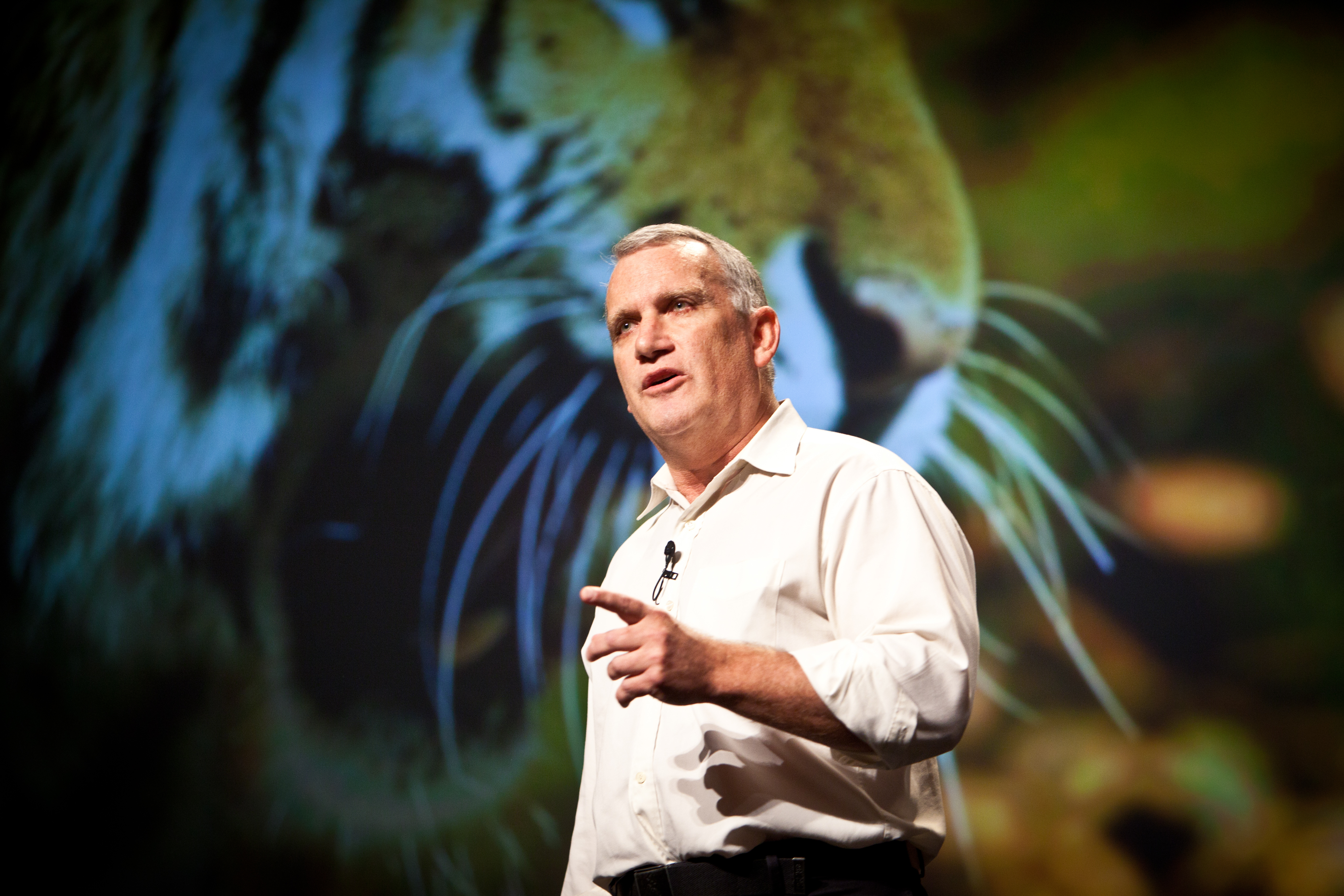
- Rabinowitz at the PopTech 2010
- Born: Alan Robert Rabinowitz; December 31, 1953; Brooklyn, New York City, New York, U.S.
- Died: August 5, 2018 (aged 64); Manhattan, New York City, New York, U.S.
- Education: Western Maryland College; University of Tennessee
- Known for: Wildlife conservation Jaguar Corridor concept
- Awards: International Wildlife Film Festival Lifetime Achievement Award (2008)
- Scientific career
- Workplaces: Bronx Zoo; Panthera Corporation

Alan Robert Rabinowitz (December 31, 1953 – August 5, 2018) was an American zoologist who served as the president, CEO, and chief scientist at Panthera Corporation, a nonprofit conservation organization devoted to protecting the world's 40 wild cat species. Called the "Indiana Jones of Wildlife Protection" by Time, he studied jaguars, clouded leopards, Asiatic leopards, tigers, Sumatran rhinos, bears, leopard cats, raccoons, cervidae, and civets.

== Early life ==
Alan Rabinowitz was born to Shirley and Frank Rabinowitz in Brooklyn, New York, but moved to Queens, New York, soon afterward. In grade school, he had a severe stutter. Unable to communicate with his peers and teachers, Rabinowitz became interested in wildlife, with which he could communicate.

Later, Rabinowitz regularly recalled how in childhood he became interested in wildlife conservation. In 2008, the video of Rabinowitz telling this story on The Colbert Report went viral. He served as a spokesperson for the Stuttering Foundation (SFA).

In 1974, Rabinowitz received his bachelor's degree in biology and chemistry from Western Maryland College (now McDaniel College) in Westminster, Maryland. He then received his M.S. (1978) and Ph.D. (1981) in ecology from the University of Tennessee.

== Career ==
Prior to co-founding the Panthera Corporation with the organization's chairman, Thomas Kaplan, in 2006, he served as the executive director of the Science and Exploration Division for the Wildlife Conservation Society, where he worked for nearly 30 years.

While working in Myanmar's Hukaung Valley in 1997, he discovered four new species of mammals, including the most primitive deer species in the world, Muntiacus putaoensis, or the leaf deer. His work in Myanmar led to the creation of five new protected areas, including the country's first marine park, Lampi Island Marine National Park; Myanmar's first and largest Himalayan national park, Hkakaborazi National Park; the country's largest wildlife sanctuary, Hukaung Valley Wildlife Sanctuary; the world's largest tiger reserve and one of the largest protected areas in the world; and Hponkanrazi Wildlife Sanctuary, an area which connects Hukaung Valley and Hkakaborazi National Park for a contiguous protected area of more than 5,000 square miles called the Northern Forest Complex.

Rabinowitz also established the world's first jaguar sanctuary – the Cockscomb Basin Wildlife Sanctuary – in Belize and the Tawu Mountain Nature Reserve, Taiwan's largest protected area and last piece of intact lowland forest. In Thailand, he conducted the first field research on Indochinese tigers, Indochinese leopards, and Asian leopard cats, leading to the designation of the Huai Kha Khaeng Wildlife Sanctuary as a UNESCO world biosphere reserve.

One of his achievements was the conceptualization and implementation of the Jaguar Corridor, a series of biological and genetic corridors for jaguars across their entire range from Mexico to Argentina. Rabinowitz also initiated Panthera's Tiger Corridor Initiative, an effort to identify and protect the world's last remaining large interconnected tiger landscapes, with a primary focus on the remote and rugged Indo-Himalayan region of Asia.

His project to establish a chain of protected tiger habitat across the southern Himalaya was the focus of the BBC Natural History Unit's documentary series Lost Land of the Tiger (2010). An expedition team spent a month investigating the status of big cats in Bhutan, leading to the rediscovery of tigers living at much higher altitudes than previously realized.

In November 2017, Rabinowitz stepped down as president and CEO to serve as the chief scientist of Panthera, where he oversaw the organization's range-wide conservation programs focused on tigers, lions, jaguars, and snow leopards and additional projects devoted to the protection of cougars, cheetahs, and leopards.

== Death ==
Rabinowitz was diagnosed with Chronic lymphocytic leukemia in 2001. He died on August 5, 2018, from the progression of his cancer. Conservation magazine Conjour said he left behind a "legacy of inspirational big cat conservation".

== Awards ==
- 2004: Our Time Theatre Company Award
- 2004: Lowell Thomas Award – New York Explorer's Club
- 2005: George Rabb Conservation Award – Chicago Zoological Society
- 2005: Flying Elephant Foundation Award
- 2006: Kaplan Big Cat Lifetime Achievement Award
- 2008: International Wildlife Film Festival Lifetime Achievement Award
- 2010: Cincinnati Zoo Wildlife Conservation Award
- 2011: Jackson Hole Lifetime Achievement Award in Conservation
- 2016: Roy Chapman Andrews Society Distinguished Explorer Award

== Books ==
Year	Title
1986/2000	Jaguar: One Man’s Struggle to Establish the First Jaguar Preserve.
1991/2002	Chasing the Dragon’s Tail: The Struggle to Save Thailand’s Wild Cats.
2001	Beyond the Last Village: A Journey of Discovery in Asia’s Forbidden Wilderness.
2005	People and Wildlife: Conflict or Coexistence?
2008	Life in the Valley of Death: The Fight to Save Tigers in a Land of Guns, Gold, and Greed.
2014	An Indomitable Beast: The Remarkable Journey of the Jaguar.
2014	A Boy and a Jaguar.
