= He Qiaonü =

Chinese businesswoman (born 1966)

- 何巧女
- Born: 29 January 1966 (age 60); Jinhua, Zhejiang, China
- Education: Beijing Forestry University
- Occupations: Founder and Executive Chairman of Beijing Orient Landscape & Environment Co Ltd

He Qiaonü (Chinese: 何巧女; born 1966) is a Chinese businesswoman and founder of Beijing Orient Landscape & Environment Co Ltd, one of Asia's largest landscape architecture companies. She has been regularly recognized as the top philanthropist in China by the China Philanthropy Research Institute of Beijing Normal University.

== Life ==
She was born in 1966 in the Zhejiang province of east China. She earned a bachelor's degree from Beijing Forestry University in 1988.

Her net worth is estimated at US$1.97 billion by Forbes magazine. In 2011, she was ranked 7th among female Chinese billionaires.

== Philanthropy ==
She donated 2.9 billion yuan of corporate stock to charity in 2016 and became the first woman to rank as the top philanthropist in mainland China according to an annual report by the China Philanthropy Research Institute of Beijing Normal University.

In 2015, she established the China Global Philanthropy Institute with Bill Gates and Ray Dalio in Shenzhen, Guangdong Province.

In 2017, she announced a ten-year commitment, to Panthera and WildCRU, supporting wildlife conservation.
