= Biolink zones =

Australian land use category

Biolink zones are a land use category developed for biodiversity conservation and landscape adaptation under changing climates. Biolink zone was first coined in 1992 to encapsulate a potential new land-use resulting from research on vertebrate fauna of se Australia and their prospective responses to climate change (Bennett et al. 1992, Brereton et al.1995). Biolink zones are identified parts of the landscape where the functional ecological connectivity for biodiversity is enhanced and / or restored to provide space for species (and consequently ecological communities) to self adapt their distributions and abundances under changing climates through natural processes including: dispersal; re-colonisation; regeneration and restoration of ecological function (Mansergh and Cheal 2007).

Bennett et al. (1992) was among the first attempts to unify the themes of the Earth Summit (1992) - both biodiversity and climate change - into an adaptation response for land-use change at the regional and sub-continental level. The abbreviated "biolinks” has become a generic term in common use and in literature (Wilson 2009) reflecting a broad resonance of the original intent of the new land-use type within various communities (land-use planners, ecologists, community groups). In concept, biolink zones are equivalent to the "bold connectivity zones" later proposed by Opdam and Wascher (2004) for adaptation to climate change and are consistent with restoration of habitat connectivity to alleviate past and current fragmentation in Australia (Soule et al. 2004). Hilty et al. (2006) in a global review of wildlife corridors, suggests continental scale re-connectivity (biolinks) as the only realistic alternative for resolution of the global conservation issues of fragmentation and climate change. In fragmented, agricultural landscapes of Australia, biolink zones have been proposed between large areas of remaining native vegetation and potential climatic refugia with future landscapes supporting 30% > 50% of quality native vegetation and habitats, representing new bio-cultural landscapes more resilient under future climates (Mansergh et al. 2008 a, b). In more ecological intact landscapes, biolink zones become a purposeful aim of management (agencies) for explicit adaptation to climate change. Biolink zones can be viewed at scales from regional to continental. Establishment is compatible with carbon sequestration (soils and vegetation), improved landscape resilience and as part of a more holistic adaptation response of land-use to climate change (Mansergh 2009). In terms of policy development, defined biolink zones are a key policy direction for land-use change to increase the resilience of biodiversity in adapting future climates in Victoria (Department of Sustainability and Environment, Victoria 2009). In the US, the Natural Resources Climate Adaptation Act of 2009 (S. 1933) has been introduced to the Senate which would require federal agencies to produce a national strategy “to maximize the resilience of landscapes and to minimize adverse climate change impacts.”

== Sources ==
- Bennett, S., Brereton, R. & Mansergh, I., 1992. Enhanced Greenhouse and the wildlife of south eastern Australia. Arthur Rylah Res. Instit. Tech Rep. 127.
- Brereton R, Bennett S.& Mansergh I., 1995. Enhanced greenhouse climate change and its potential effect on selected fauna of south-eastern Australia: a trend analysis. Biological Conservation 72: 339-354.
- Department of Sustainability and Environment (Victoria) (2009). Securing Our Natural Future. (author, Melbourne). https://web.archive.org/web/20110309005841/http://www.dse.vic.gov.au/DSE/nrence.nsf/LinkView/9DB1809566C926A1CA25767E001128C7A87712F40FADECFFCA25767300162346
- Hilty JA, Lidicker WZ & Merenlender AM (2006). Corridor Ecology: The science and practice of linking landscapes for biodiversity conservation (Island Press, Washington): 323.
- Mansergh I & Cheal D (2007). Protected area planning and management for eastern Australian temperate forests and woodland ecosystems under climate change – a landscape approach, Chapter 8 in Taylor M & Figgis P {eds] Protected areas: buffering against climate change : Proceedings of a WWF and IUCN World Commission on Protected Areas symposium: 18–19 June 2007, Canberra. (WWF Australia, Sydney).
- Mansergh I, Cheal D & Fitzsimons J (2008). Future landscapes in south-eastern Australia: the role of protected areas and biolinks in adaptation to climate change. Biodiversity 9 3& 4: 59-70. http://nstl1.nstl.gov.cn/pages/2008/173/00/9(3-4).pdf
- Mansergh, I, Lau A. & Anderson, R. 2008. Geographic landscape visualisation in planning adaptation to climate change in Victoria, Australia, In Pettit C, William Cartwright W, Bishop I, Lowell K, Pullar D, Duncan D [eds] (2008). Landscape Analysis and Visualisation. Lecturer Notes in Geoinformation and Cartography Series (Springer, Berlin): Chapter 23.
- Mez Biolink
- Opdam P & Wascher P (2004). Climate change meets habitat fragmentation: linking landscape and biogeographical scale levels in research and conservation. Biological Conservation 117: 285–97.
- Wilson K (2009). Gondwanalink meets decision theory. Decision Point 25: 10-12. https://web.archive.org/web/20090913153418/http://www.aeda.edu.au/docs/Newsletters/DPoint_25.pdf
