= Kwan Wai-nung =

Chinese artist

Kwan Wai-nung (Chinese: 關蕙農; pinyin: Guān Huìnóng; 1878–1956) was a Chinese artist. A descendant of Lam Qua, Kwan was born in Guangdong and studied Chinese painting under Ju Lian. He fused this with a more Western style learnt from his brother, Kwan Kin-hing.

Kwan migrated to Hong Kong at the beginning of the 20th century. He became art director for the South China Morning Post in 1911, before leaving in 1915 to set up his own lithographic business, the Asiatic Lithographic Printing Press in Sai Ying Pun. During the 1920s and 1930s Kwan personally designed calendars and posters for various companies in the city. Calendars acted as branded merchandise and artists were often hired to make the product seem more appealing. Kwan understood the impact advertising had on businesses and positioned his art, many of which featured modestly dressed pin-up girls, as a means of relaying brands to customers. Among his designs are 'Two Girls' (1931) for Kwong Sang Hong and posters for Tiger Balm.

His company imported modern printing technology from Britain and Germany and opened branches in Singapore, Guangzhou and Shanghai. Effectively cornering the market in Hong Kong at the time, his success led to him being named 'King of the Calendar Poster'. After the Second World War, Kwan handed control over his company to his sons.

== See also ==
- Gao Jianfu
