= He Jianshi =

Chinese cartoonist and songwriter

- 何劍士
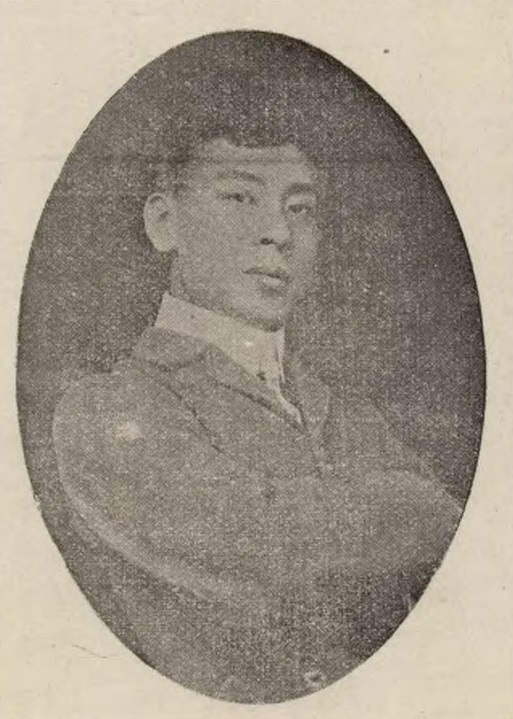
- Born: He Bing (何昺); 1877; Nanhai, Guangdong, Qing China
- Died: 25 August 1915 (aged 37–38); Guangzhou, Guangdong, Republic of China

Chinese name
- Traditional Chinese: 何劍士
- Simplified Chinese: 何剑士
Transcriptions
Standard Mandarin
- Hanyu Pinyin: Hé Jiànshì
- Wade–Giles: Ho^{2} Chien^{4}-shih^{4}
- IPA: [xɤ̌ tɕjɛ̂n.ʂî]
Yue: Cantonese
- Jyutping: ho4 gim3 si6

He Jianshi (Chinese: 何劍士, 1877 – 1915) was a Chinese cartoonist, painter, and songwriter. The son of He Kunshan, a wealthy businessman, He learned the arts in his youth, as well as sword fighting from a monk in Sichuan. In 1905, He began producing cartoons for the Journal of Current Pictorial, using among numerous others the pen name Jianshi ("Swordsman"), and continued producing manhua for The True Record when that magazine was established in 1911. A member of the Tongmenghui, an anti-Qing movement, he promoted the use of Chinese opera to spread revolutionary ideas. Analysis of He's work has emphasized his flamboyant style, drawing from the literati tradition while blending realism and exaggeration.

== Biography ==
=== Early life ===
He Jianshi was born He Bing (何昺) in Nanhai, Guangdong, in 1877. The son of He Kunshan, a wealthy businessman, (Note: He Kunshan had studied in Germany and taken a German woman as a second wife. He Jianshi had two half-siblings from the union (Southern Metropolis Daily 2019).) He gained a familiarity with the arts – including music, painting, and poetry – from a young age. Other pursuits included equestrianism and hunting. He developed a fondness for alcohol and a reputation as a womanizer.

In his youth, He wandered China. While in Sichuan, he trained under a monk, thereby becoming a proficient sword fighter. He thus took Jianshi ("Swordsman") as his most commonly used art name, though was also known by the courtesy name Zhonghua (仲華) and numerous pen names. (Note: The Guangdong Department of Arts and Culture (Jiang 2019) records the following: Anjian (按剑), Yunzhong (允中), Ga Gasheng (嗄嗄生), Yapai (亚派), Jianlang (剑郎, "Sword Master"), Jianshilang (剑士郎, "Swordsman"), Mojian Shaonian (磨剑少年, "Sword-Grinder"), Nanxia Yajian (南侠亚剑), and Nanhai Jiansanlang (南海剑三郎).) His family lost its fortune in the early 20th century, and He lived in isolation.

=== Cartoonist ===
He returned to Guangdong, where he joined the Tongmenghui, a group opposed to the Qing dynasty, and began producing manhua (cartoons) decrying them. (Note: At the time, the term manhua had yet to be adopted. He would have known these works as "funny pictures" (谐画; 滑稽画) or "satire pictures" (讽刺画) (Southern Metropolis Daily 2019).) When the Journal of Current Pictorial was established under Pan Dawei in September 1905, He joined as a cartoonist, producing numerous manhua for the magazine – eight to ten per issue. For the magazine's inaugural issue, he prepared a short poem espousing its purpose:

Cantonese

時事駛乜你報
有畫就唔同
任你舌敝唇焦唔講得佢咁切痛
任你手拳指畫亦唔顯得佢咁玲瓏
呢個畫報主人心血熱湧
欲把國民喚醒在夢中

English

Current events found in your newspaper
Oh so different with pictures
You can't speak with burnt tongue and lips, too great the pain
No matter how you draw with your fists, it won't look the same
The owner of this pictorial brims with passion
Seeking to wake the people from their dreams.

At the time, the treatment of Chinese workers in the United States was the subject of heated discourse. When American delegates – including Secretary of War William Howard Taft – visited Guangzhou in 1905, the Journal of Current Pictorial published several anti-American articles. He painted several pieces of street art expressing similar sentiments. One, depicting a turtle carrying a beautiful woman, urged locals to refuse to carry sedan chairs for the visiting Americans. Ultimately, the Journal of Current Pictorial was banned by the Qing dynasty in 1907, and He and its staff left for Hong Kong to continue publication. After continued pressure from the Qing government, in 1908 the British government of Hong Kong also banned the publication.

=== Later years and death ===
During the Xinhai Revolution in 1911, He penned several songs, including "Farewell" (送别), "Flower Burial" (葬花), and "Yanzi Tower" (燕子楼). He believed that the Chinese opera could be used to cultivate support for the revolutionaries, and in 1906 he had – together with Pan Dawei, Lai Yitao, and Liang Juexian – established the Youshijie Drama Society in Guangzhou for that purpose. He was manager of the group. In 1912, with the establishment of The True Record, He was one of the inaugural staff. Before it closed in 1913, the magazine published dozens of comics; attribution is difficult, as He and fellow cartoonists Zheng Nuquan and Ma Xingchi used more than a dozen pen names between them.

Often working through the night, He became sickly and was later diagnosed with tuberculosis. He died in Guangdong on 16 July 1915, shortly after painting a picture of swarming insects. The comics writer Zheng Jiazhen writes that, shortly before he died, He fell into a stupor. Upon awakening, he found that his hair had greyed, and realized that he would soon die.

== Analysis ==
According to Guo Shan of Nanfeng News, He had a flamboyant style. He's early works drew from the realism that marked cartoons in the Dianshizhai Pictorial, an illustrated magazine published as a supplement to the Shen Bao. Over time, however, these works became increasingly exaggerated and imaginative. The manhua scholar Huang Dade described his work as an awakening, showing that while it is necessary to grasp the essence of realism, an exaggerated or even sloppy presentation can be effective. Zheng writes that he greatly influenced the development of Hong Kong manhua.

In painting, He drew from the literati tradition. Hu Shan of the Hong Kong Asia Pacific Artists Association notes a combination of traditional styles and brushwork with Western concepts of sketching and shading. Hu writes that He's skills cannot be described as profound, which he attributes to the breadth of the artist's interests.

== Gallery ==
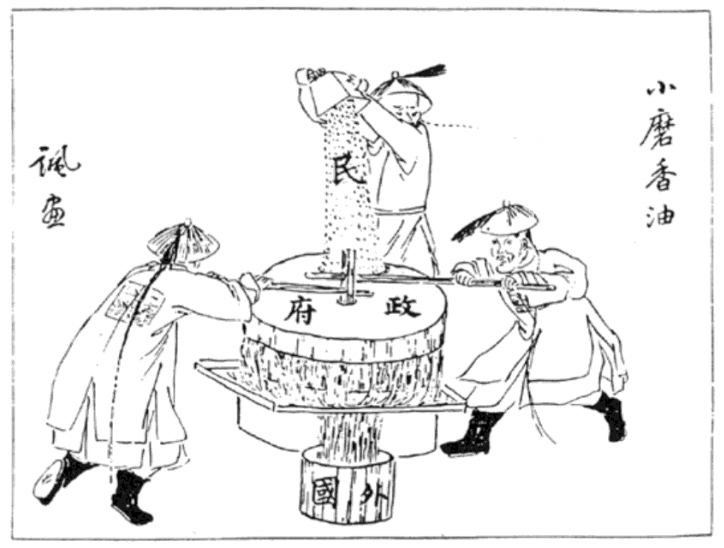
Grinding Sesame Oil

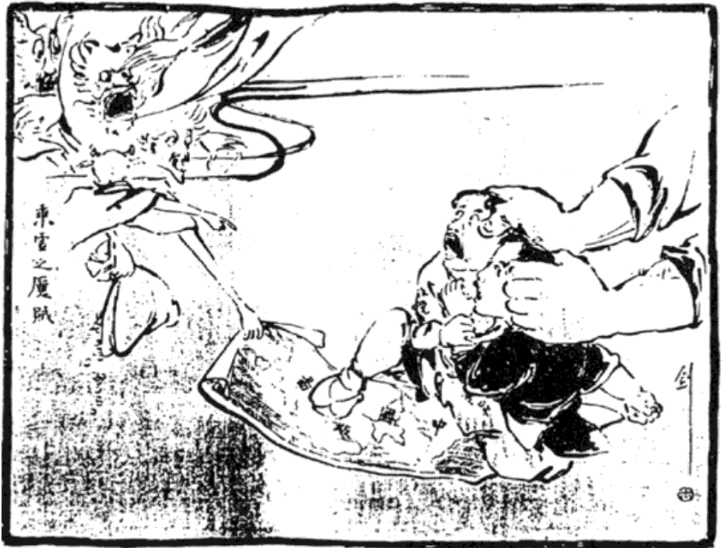
Seizing the Opportunity

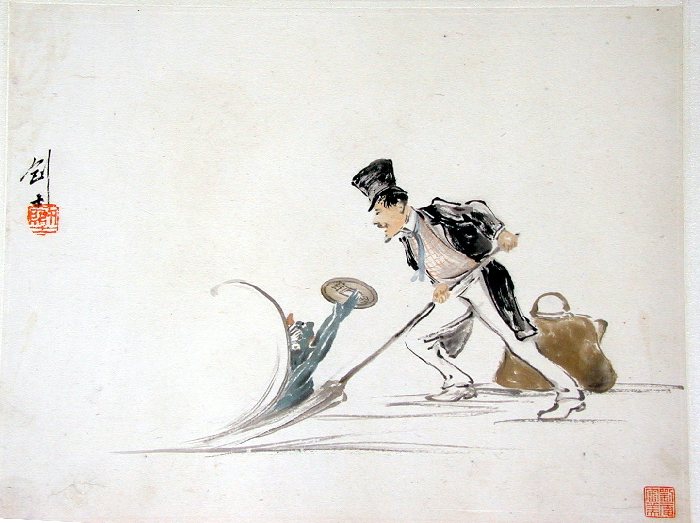
Character Album

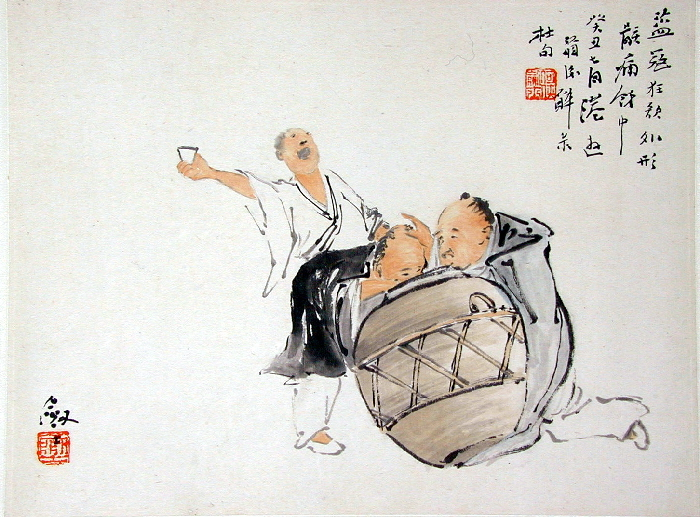
The Bandit's Song (1913)

== Works cited ==
- [广州画卷] 何剑士：辣笔妙画风流倜傥 讥刺怒骂快意恩仇 [[Guangzhou Scroll] He Jianshi: The Sharp and Wonderful Painting of a Romantic and Suave Man, Satirizing and Scolding, and Taking Pleasure in Gratitude and Revenge]. Southern Metropolis Daily (in Chinese). 26 May 2009. Archived from the original on 18 January 2024 – via Guangzhou Library.
- Chen Xianqing (陈贤庆) (21 February 2010). 孙中山与粤剧及粤剧艺人 [Sun Yat-sen, the Cantonese Opera, and Cantonese Opera Artists]. Zhongshan Daily (in Chinese). Archived from the original on 10 August 2016.
- Guo Shan (蔡登山) (28 August 2014). 潘达微与何剑士：寓褒贬于毫端诛奸邪于纸上 [Pan Dawei and He Jianshi: Putting Praise and Blame to Paper and Punishing Evil on Paper]. Nanfeng News (in Chinese). Archived from the original on 4 October 2024 – via Sina.com.
- 何剑士 [He Jianshi]. Foshan Museum.
- Jiang Peiyang (江沛扬) (6 May 2019). 广东——中国现代漫画的策源地 [Guangdong – The Origin of Modern Chinese Comics] (in Chinese). Guangdong Department of Arts and Culture. Archived from the original on 21 July 2020.
- Lent, John A.; Ying, Xu (2017). "Cradle of Chinese Cartooning". In Lent, John A.; Ying, Xu (eds.). Comics Art in China. Univ. Press of Mississippi. doi:10.14325/mississippi/9781496811745.003.0001. ISBN 978-1-4968-1175-2.
- Pan Yaochang (潘耀昌) Xu Li (徐立) (2011). 上海早期都市文艺先锋《真相画报》 [Shanghai's Early Urban Art Pioneer - "The True Record"] (PDF). Journal of Shanghai University (in Chinese): 131–140.
- Wong, Wendy Siuyi (2002). Hong Kong Comics. New York: Princeton Architectural Press. ISBN 978-1-56898-269-4.
- Zheng Jiazhen (鄭家鎮) (2018). 香港漫畫春秋 [Hong Kong Comics: Spring and Autumn] (in Chinese). Sanlian Bookstore. ISBN 978-962-04-4165-3.
- 广东是中国现代漫画的发源地 [Guangdong is the Birthplace of Modern Chinese Comics]. ifeng.com (in Chinese). Phoenix Television. 15 November 2015. Archived from the original on 9 November 2024.
