= Panthera Corporation =

American charitable organization

Panthera
- Founded: 2006
- Founders: Thomas S. Kaplan; Alan Rabinowitz
- Type: Non-profit organization
- Tax ID no.: 20-4668756
- Purpose: Develops, implements, and oversees range-wide species conservation strategies
- Headquarters: New York City
- Region served: World-wide
- CEO: Frederic Launay, Ph.D
- Website: https://www.panthera.org

Panthera Corporation is a charitable organization devoted to preserving wild cats and their ecosystems around the globe. Founded in 2006, Panthera is devoted to the conservation of the world's 40 species of wild cats and the vast ecosystems they inhabit. Their team of biologists, data scientists, law enforcement experts and wild cat advocates studies and protects the seven species of big cats: cheetahs, jaguars, leopards, lions, pumas, snow leopards and tigers. Panthera also creates targeted conservation strategies for the world's most threatened and overlooked small cats, such as fishing cats, ocelots and Andean cats. The organization has offices in New York City and Europe, as well as offices in Mesoamerica, South America, Africa, UAE and Asia.

== Programs and grants ==
Panthera works in partnership with local and international NGOs, scientific institutions, corporate partner and government agencies to develop and implement range-wide species conservation strategies. It has funded the Wildlife Conservation Research Unit at Oxford University, with a diploma program in international wildlife practice. The organization also awards a number of grants to support promising field conservationists. These grant programs include the Kaplan Graduate Awards, the Research and Conservation Grants, the Small Cat Action Fund, the Sabin Snow Leopard Grant Program and the Winston Cobb Memorial Fellowships.

== Founders and leadership ==
Frederic Launay is Chief Executive Officer (CEO) and President of Panthera.

Panthera was co-founded in 2006 by American scientist Alan Rabinowitz and American entrepreneur Thomas S. Kaplan.

Kaplan was Chairman of Panthera's Board of Trustees, succeeded in 2021 by Jonathan Ayers. Kaplan is Chairman of The Global Alliance for Wild Cats. Rabinowitz was the first President and CEO from 2001 until 2017 when he was succeeded by French scientist Fred Launay. Rabinowitz helped establish the world's first jaguar preserve in 1986, in Belize, and was the main driving force behind the Jaguar Corridor that connects jaguar populations across its range, from Mexico to Argentina.

In 2014 Kaplan and his wife Daphne Recanati Kaplan pledged $20 million over 10 years to fund the organization. The couple were joined by H.H. Sheikh Mohamed bin Zayed Al Nahyan, Jho Low and Hemendra Kothari each who each pledged the same amount to support the organization.

=== Board members ===
- Jonathan Ayers, board chair and former chairman and CEO of IDEXX Laboratories
- Frederic Launay, Ph.D., President and CEO of Panthera and former presidential advisor of IUCN
- Thomas S. Kaplan, Ph.D., founder and Global Alliance chair
- Ross J. Beaty, C.M., benefactor of the Beaty Biodiversity Museum
- Lieutenant General Sir Graeme Lamb, KBE, CMG, DSO
- Duncan McFarland, director of New Profit Inc.
- Hon. Claudia A. McMurray
- H.E. Razan Khalifa Al Mubarak
- HH Prince Badr bin Abdullah Al-Saud
- Robert Quartermain
- Eira Thomas

== Projects ==
=== South and Central America projects ===
In South America, Mesoamerica and Mexico, Panthera is developing a transnational corridor to help protect the jaguar. Jaguar survival and health depends on a network of corridors that span the continent, while past efforts focused on developing distinct sanctuaries. It is the jaguar's ability to travel long distances that prevents inbreeding and consequent extinction.

In August 2010, in Belize, Panthera worked with the government to create the Labouring Creek Jaguar Corridor Wildlife Sanctuary, with more than 7,000 acres (28 km^{2}) of land. The project is part of the Panthera Jaguar Corridor Initiative. In Costa Rica, it is researching the routes that jaguars travel, and encouraging politicians and developers to respect those routes. They are also sponsoring community outreach programs to alleviate "jaguar conflict issues". In Mesoamerica and North America, Panthera also supports partners in Mexico, Guatemala, Honduras and Nicaragua, in addition to its ongoing work in Belize and Costa Rica.

In early 2010, Panthera signed a deal with the Colombian government to protect and develop the area where the Central and South American jaguar corridors converge in Colombia. In Brazil, Panthera manages Fazenda Jofre Velho, one of the most important research bases in the Pantanal. They are working with local ranchers to find benign ways to protect their cattle, rather than the typical approach of shooting the jaguars.

Panthera's South American puma initiatives are focused in Chile. Working with their partner, the Fundación Cerro Guido Conservación, they are exploring various methods to enhance the peaceful coexistence between pumas and sheep, including protective Maremma and Pirineos sheepdogs, Foxlights and supporting puma ecotourism.

=== United States projects ===
Panthera also works to protect pumas and small cats across the Americas. In the Northwest, their Olympic Cougar Project represents an important partnership between Panthera and six indigenous tribes, led by the Lower Elwha Klallam Tribe, to study and protect pumas in the dense coniferous forests, glacier-clad mountains and rugged coastlines of Washington’s Olympic Peninsula. Previously, Panthera's puma initiatives in the United States were focused in Wyoming.

=== Asia and Middle East projects ===
In Asia, Panthera's Tigers Forever project is planning a 5,000-mile (8,000 km) long corridor from Bhutan to Myanmar for wild tiger populations. The corridor would also include land in northeast India, Thailand, and Malaysia, and possibly Laos, Cambodia, and Vietnam.

Panthera works in India, and has increased tiger numbers in Manas National Park. Additionally, further east, in August 2010, the government of Myanmar announced the expansion, by 4,248 square miles (11,000 km²), of the Hukawng Valley Tiger Reserve, the world's largest tiger preserve. Panthera CEO Alan Rabinowitz helped bring together representatives from the Kachin Independence Army and the Myanmar government to make the expansion possible.

In Johor State, Malaysia, Panthera is working with the state government and the Wildlife Conservation Society to increase tiger numbers by 50% over a ten-year period. As part of that project, in early 2010 Panthera cameras captured an image of a rare spotted leopard in Taman Negara National Park and Endau-Rompin National Park, where only black leopards were believed to exist.

Panthera also works in Thailand to protect wild cats, including tigers and fishing cats, and in Malaysian Borneo to study the five species of small cats that inhabit Sabah.

In August 2010, the government of Burma announced the expansion, by 4,248 square miles (11,000 km^{2}), of the Hukawng Valley Tiger Reserve, the world's largest tiger preserve. The late Alan Rabinowitz helped bring together representatives from the Kachin Independence Army and the Burma government to make the expansion possible.

In Johor State, Malaysia, Panthera is working with the state government and the Wildlife Conservation Society to increase tiger numbers by 50% over a ten-year period. As part of that project, in early 2010 Panthera cameras captured an image of a rare spotted leopard in Taman Negara National Park and Endau-Rompin National Park, where only black leopards were believed to exist.

Panthera's Snow Leopard Program is studying the species in Mongolia, and surveying new regions where the animals are likely to live, but have not yet been discovered. They work with local animal herders to train them in new approaches that will reduce livestock lost to the leopards. They are also working at protection for the estimated 3,500 to 7,000 snow leopards in Central Asia. Programs include giving a bonus to Mongolian herding communities that have gone one year without killing a snow leopard, and livestock vaccinations in Pakistan, where loss to disease is greater than leopard depredation.

Panthera's Snow Leopard Program has studied the species in Mongolia, and surveyed new regions where the animals are likely to live, but have not yet been discovered. They are also working to protect snow leopards in Central Asia, including in Kyrgyzstan and Tajikistan.

Panthera's work in the Middle East focuses on the Arabian Peninsula. With the support provided by the Royal Commission for AlUla (RCU), there is a strong focus on leopards, and specifically on restoring and conserving leopards in Saudi Arabia.

=== Africa projects ===
Panthera works across the African continent. In South Africa, the Sabi Sands protected area, bordering the Kruger National Park, is a long-term leopard research site and one of Panthera's flagship projects. The knowledge generated from this work is critical to informing local wildlife management and broader conservation policy across the leopard range.

Within Zambia, Panthera project sites are focused in the Greater Kafue Ecosystem (GKE). They currently support 17 anti-poaching teams, two dedicated lion monitoring and protection teams and one leopard monitoring team across Kafue National Park and surrounding Game Management Areas. Panthera's Cheetah Program has also GPS collared cheetahs in the park. Panthera also has project sites elsewhere across southern Africa, including in Zimbabwe and Angola.

Since 2010, Panthera has collaborated with Agence Nationale des Parcs Nationaux (ANPN), Gabon's National Park Agency, to monitor wildlife in Plateaux Batéké National Park, where a lone male lion was spotted on a camera trap. Panthera Gabon is currently working on a countrywide leopard survey and helping the Gabonese government and ANPN identify gazelle wildlife movement corridors in order to secure and connect populations.

Over the past decade, Panthera has built a strong working relationship with the government of Senegal, formalized through a long-term agreement with the Department of National Parks to strengthen park management and security in Niokolo-Koba National Park. They provide direct support to ranger teams for effective large-scale patrols, the rebuilding and expansion of the park's infrastructure and intensive ecological monitoring, including monitoring of lions using GPS-satellite collars.

Panthera also works on initiatives in southern Africa that provide synthetic wild cat furs to communities in place of traditional garb. They work with the Barotse Royal Establishment of the Lozi People in Zambia (Saving Spots Initiative) and the Nazareth Baptist Church eBuhleni (known as the Shembe Church) in South Africa (Furs for Life Initiative) in this capacity. More than 18,500 synthetic capes have already been distributed to the Shembe Church, and synthetic garb was provided to the Lozi people during the traditional Kuomboka Festival in 2022.

== See also ==
- Rewilding (conservation biology)
- Conservation science (biology)
- Conservation status
- GPS animal tracking
