= Shi Jianru =

Chinese revolutionist (late Qing Dynasty)

- 史坚如 史堅如
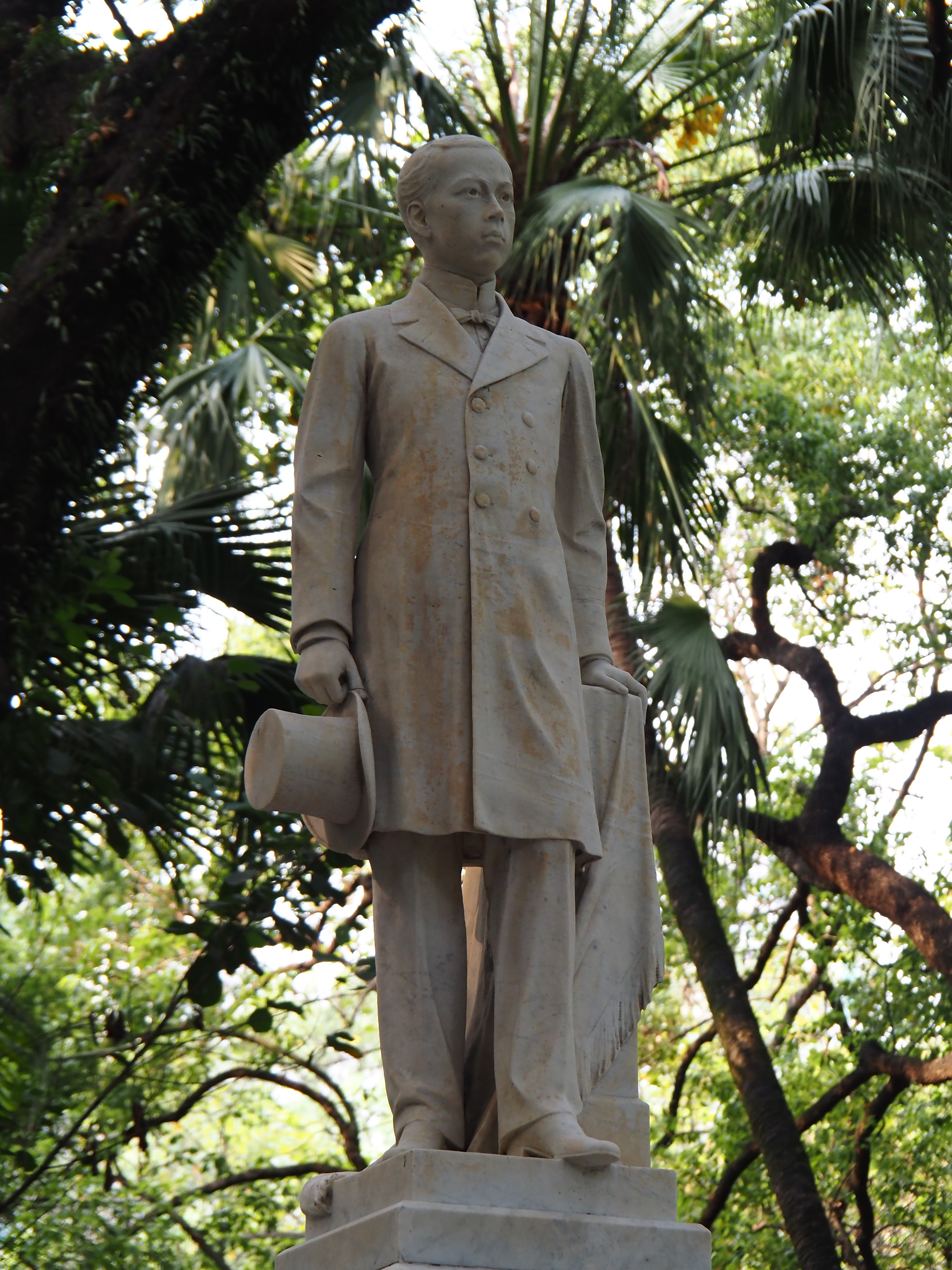
- Statue at the grave of Shi Jianru in Guangzhou
- Born: Shi Jiuwei 史久緯; June 24, 1879; Panyu, Guangdong, China (Qing Empire)
- Died: November 9, 1900 (aged 21)(executed); Guangzhou, Guangdong, China (Qing Empire)
- Other names: Shi Jingru 史經如
- Education: Gezhi Academy
- Occupation: Revolutionary
- Known for: Attempted to bomb the Guangdong Viceroy and Acting Governor-General of Liangguang, De Shou.
- Political party: Revive China Society
- Relatives: 1 brother, 1 sister

Shi Jianru (Simplified Chinese: 史坚如, Traditional Chinese: 史堅如, June 24, 1879 – November 9, 1900), originally named Shi Jiuwei (史久緯), styled Jingru (經如), later changed to Jianru, was a Christian from Panyu, Guangdong, China (Qing Dynasty). He was a martyr against the late Qing dynasty, also a descendant of the Ming dynasty general Shi Kefa. In October 1900, he made an unsuccessful attempt to bomb the highest-ranking official of Guangdong, for which he was arrested and executed by Qing authorities.

== Life ==
Shi was born into a wealthy bureaucratic family, with ancestors from Shanyin, Zhejiang. He had one brother and one sister. Despite being frail in his youth, he was intelligent and fond of learning, enjoying reading books. In 1898, he enrolled in the Christian Gezhi Academy, where he received a Western-style education. In 1899, he joined the Revive China Society through the introduction of a Professor from Gezhi Academy and met Sun Yat-sen in Yokohama, Japan. Upon returning to China, he started to organize revolutionary activities in the Hunan region and planned an uprising.

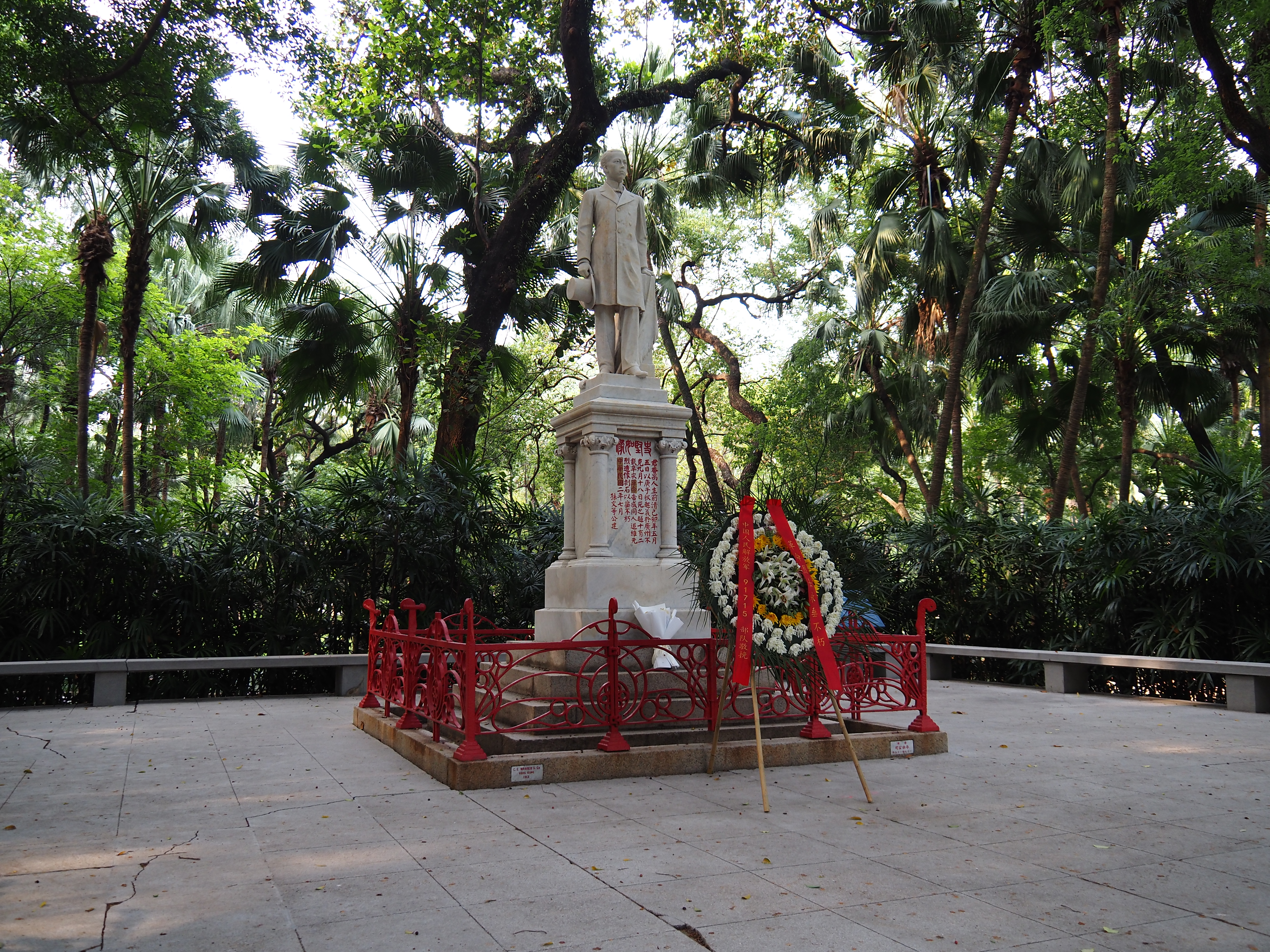
Shi's statue in his graveyard

In 1900, the Boxer Rebellion erupted in northern China which led to the invasion of the Eight-Nation Alliance. Revolutionary forces, under the leadership of Sun Yat-sen, seized the opportunity presented by the chaos to launch uprisings. Zheng Shiliang initiated the Huizhou Uprising, while Shi Jianru raised funds in Guangzhou by mortgaging his own land to support the revolution. However, due to a lack of funds, the revolutionary forces in Guangzhou, led by Shi, were weak, prompting him to devise a big plan to gain influence. He considered assassinating the local Governor-General, De Shou, to support the Huizhou Uprising. Initially, he purchased 25 boxes of explosives, but they were seized by authorities. Later, he acquired 200 pounds of explosives. Under the name of his friend Song Shaodong, Shi rented a mansion behind De Shou's residence and dug a tunnel there to store the explosives. On the night of October 26, 1900, Shi attempted to detonate the explosives. Due to a faulty fuse, they failed to explode. Then, in the early hours of October 30, he successfully detonated the explosives, causing several civilian casualties and damaging nearby buildings. However, the explosion didn't harm De Shou physically; it simply startled him awake by pushing him out of bed. This event astonished the public as well.

Local authorities swiftly launched an investigation and obtained information about Shi's whereabouts from one of his relatives, who feared being implicated in the case. Despite the risk, instead of fleeing, Shi returned to the site of the explosion to figure out why De Shou survived the attack. He was captured on his way to Hong Kong at the provincial dock in Guangzhou on October 31 and taken into custody. During interrogation, he endured severe torture, causing him to lose consciousness several times, yet he steadfastly refused to divulge information about his accomplices.

On November 8, 1900, De Shou issued the order for Shi's execution. The next day, November 9, Shi was escorted to the execution ground near Tianzi Wharf in Guangzhou, where he was beheaded at the young age of 21. As a warning to the public, his head was displayed at the site of the explosion. De Shou reported the incident to the imperial court and later received approval for his actions.

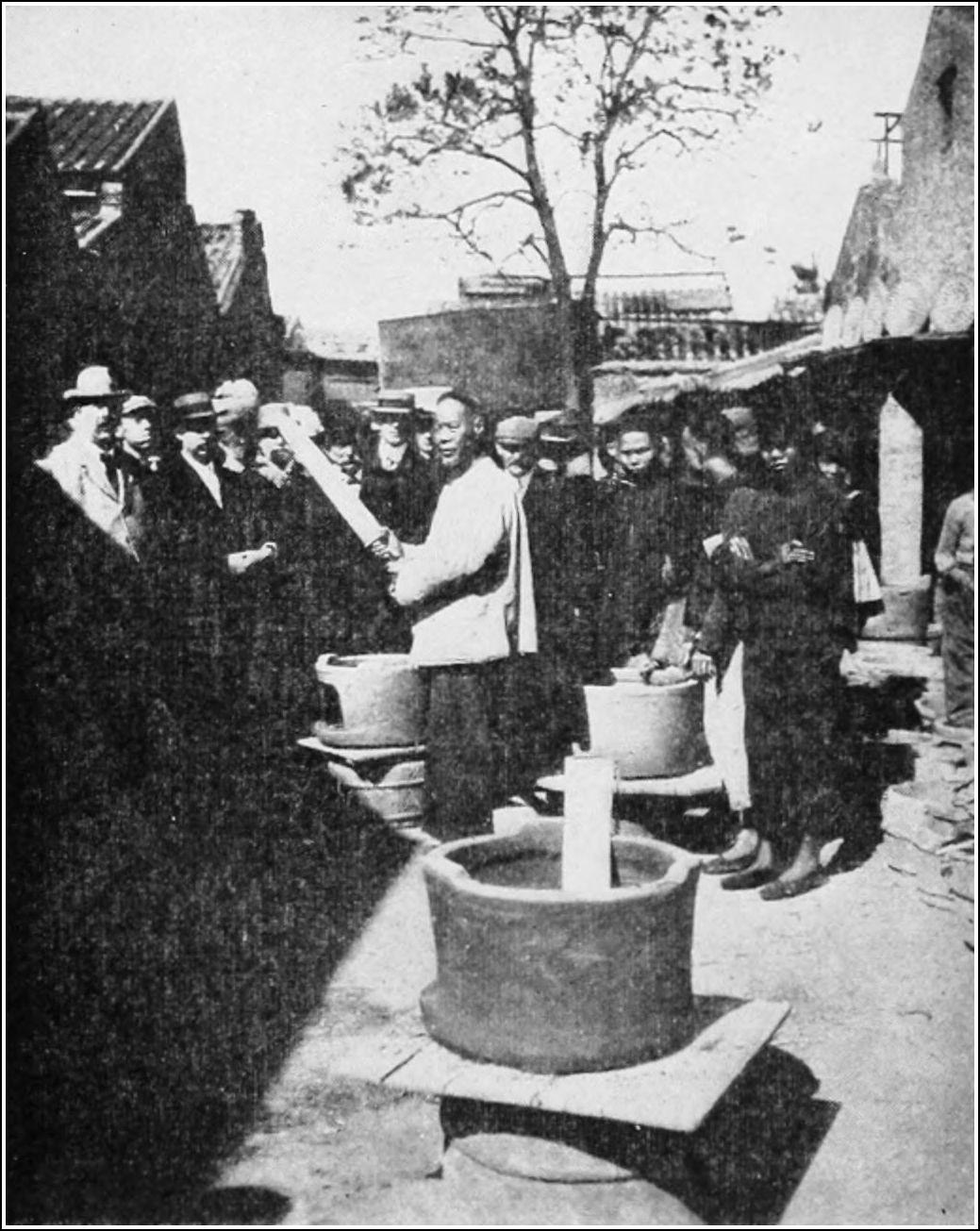
The execution ground of Guangzhou (then Canton) where Shi Jianru was beheaded in Nov 1900 (not photographed during Shi's execution). In the ground stood an executioner holding his sword with foreign visitors around as this is also a hot spot for touring. Local authorities carried out capital punishment here every year in the Qing era.

== Afterwards ==
After Shi's execution, the authorities discarded his body in a desolate hill east of the city, where executed prisoners were laid to rest together. Witnessing this, the compassionate abbot of a nearby temple secretly buried Shi's remains in a crypt beneath the Buddha altar within the temple.

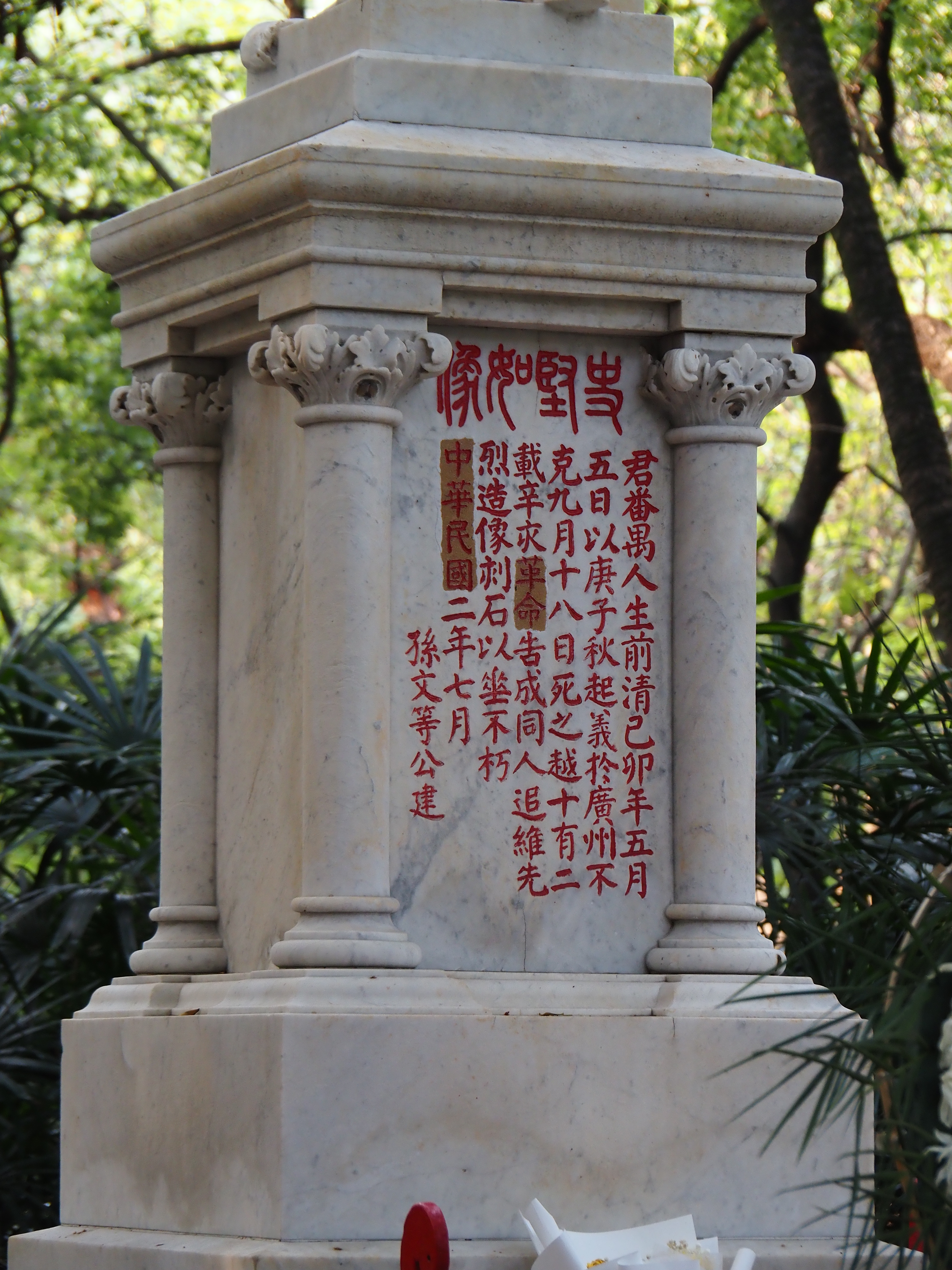
The inscription written by Sun Yat-sen and his companions for the statue of Shi Jianru (Chinese).

Following the fall of the Qing dynasty, Shi's story was revisited. In late 1911, voices emerged advocating for the casting of a bronze statue in his honor. On April 28, 1912, Sun Yat-sen convened a memorial ceremony for Shi Jianru in Guangzhou, attended by around six to seven thousand people from all walks of life. Sun praised him as a “model of righteousness and heroism".

In early 1913, the still-living abbot of the temple informed Hu Hanmin, then governor of Guangzhou and a close friend of Shi Jianru, about the burial. The monks donated the temple's land, which Hu Hanmin turned into a shrine for Shi, managed by his relatives. Shi's remains were reinterred in a golden pagoda on the site. Upon learning of this, Sun Yat-sen immediately wrote an inscription for Shi Jianru's memorial. In 1917, the Yunnan-Guangdong Army produced a bronze statue of Shi Jianru.

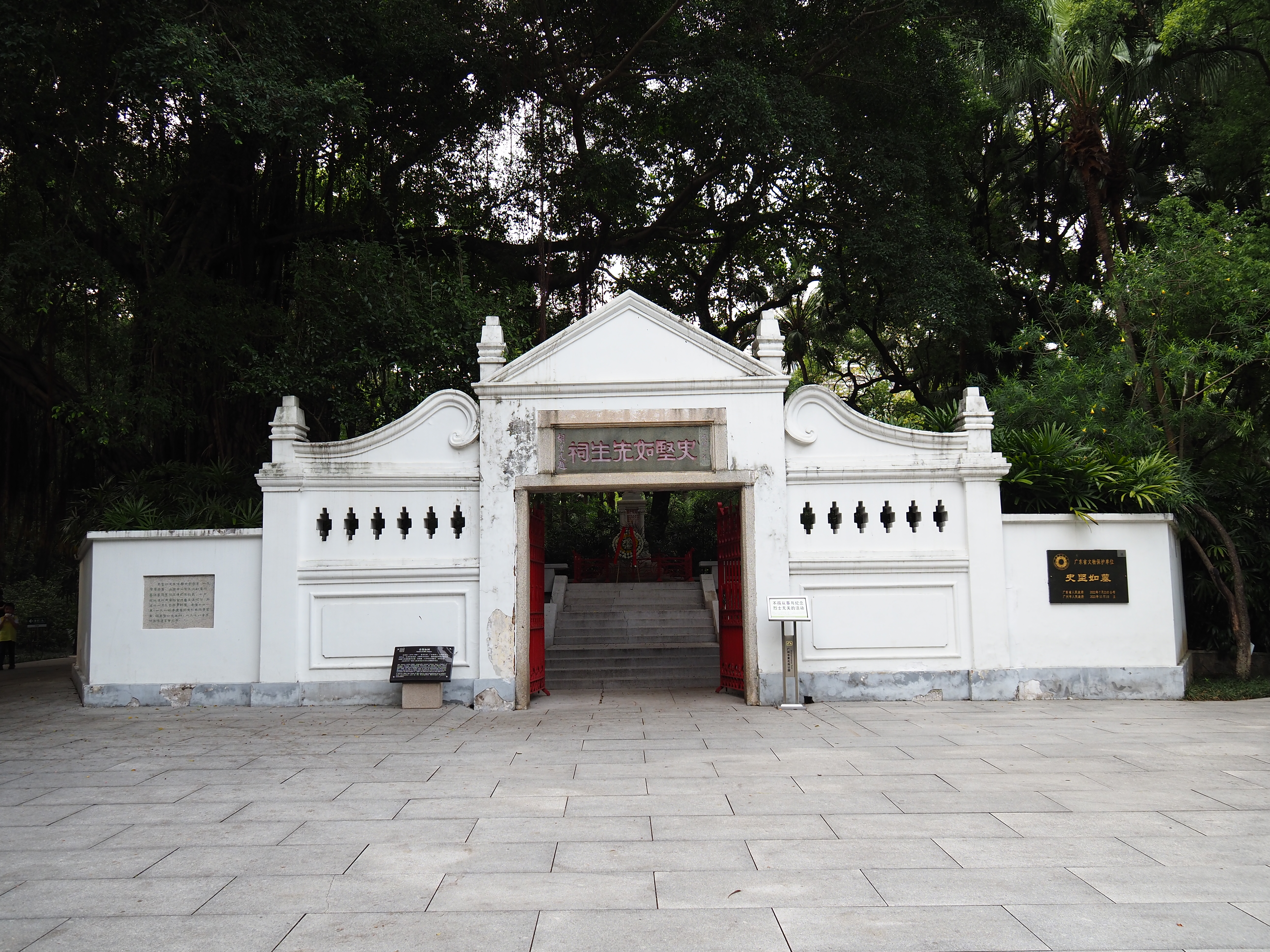
The shrine of Shi Jianru’s tomb is located within the Huanghuagang Martyrs’ Cemetery in Guangzhou, with the plaque above the entrance inscribed by Hu Hanmin.

In 1924, the Kuomintang erected a white marble statue of Shi at Lingnan School, his alma mater, which was unveiled on May 20 and later moved to his shrine. In December of the same year, Hu Hanmin erected a monument in the First Park (now Guangzhou People's Park) in honor of Shi. In 1928, Shi Jianru's nominal son, Shi Xuji, entrusted the shrine to the government.

In 1978, the Guangzhou Cultural Relics Department relocated Shi's golden pagoda to the Huanghuagang Martyrs’ Cemetery and established a shrine for him there, along with his stone statue and Hu Hanmin's inscribed plaque.

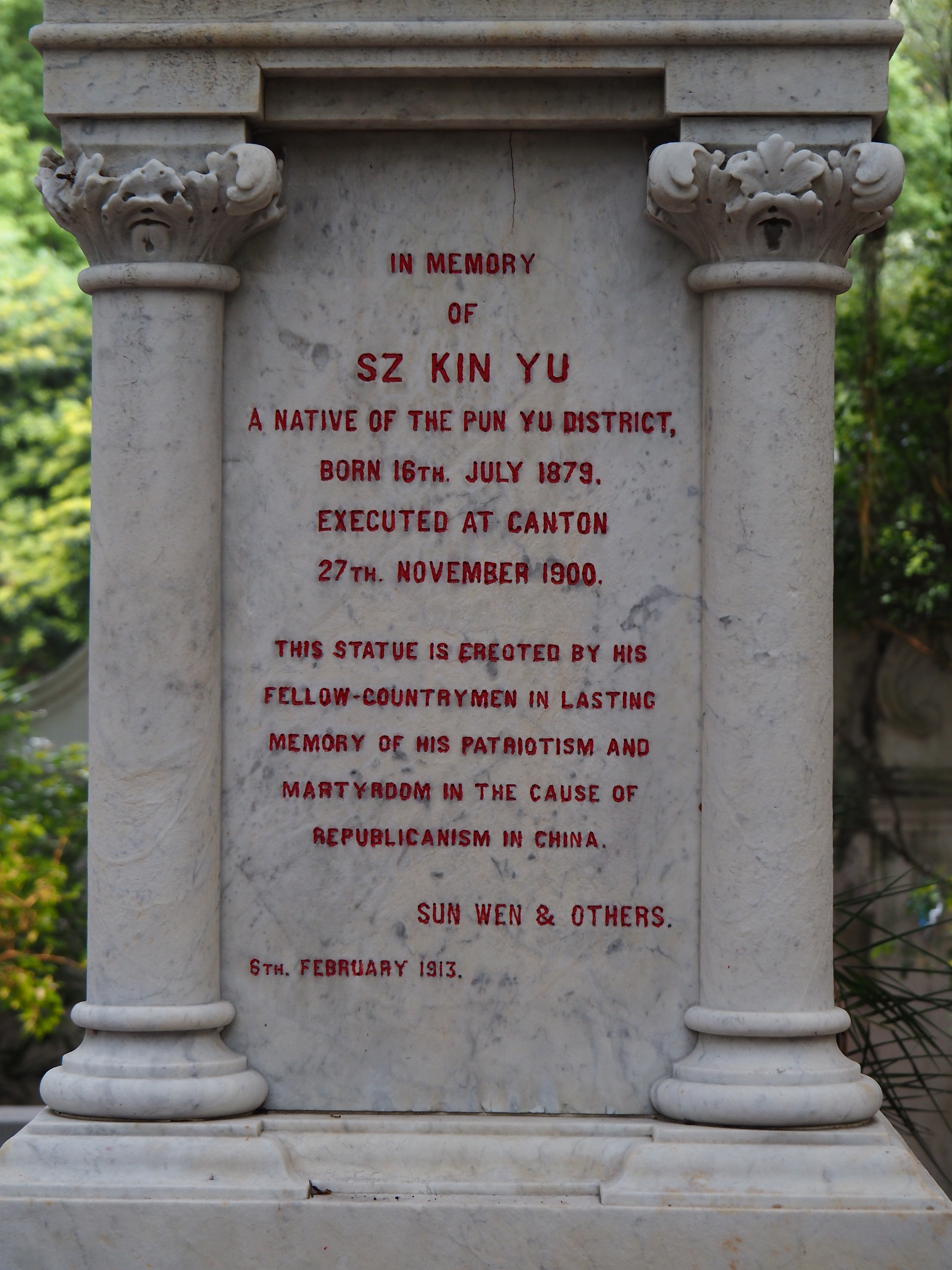
The epitaph written in English by Sun Yat-sen and others for the statue of Shi Jianru. It contains inaccuracies in his birth and death dates.

In Sun Yat-sen University (formerly Lingnan University), there is a memorial pavilion called “Xingting,” donated and built by Xing Society students in 1928, to commemorate Shi Jianru, Qu Lizhou, and Xu Yaozhang, three faculty members.

== Family members ==
- Older Brother: Shi Guyu (史古愚, ?-1914), a revolutionary, also known as Zhang Xiaoran. He sold family property to participate in Sun Yat-sen’s revolution.
- Younger Sister: Shi Jingran (史憬然, 1881-1902), was a progressive young woman who majored in Chinese medicine and was active in revolution activities like his older brother. She was also a member of the Xingzhonghui, in which she was the only female. She died due to illness caused by cold raw food in 1902.
- Nominal Son: Shi Xuji (史勖濟), born in 1904, was the son of Shi Guyu. He became the nominal son of Shi Jianru in his father's wish. He once taught at the 25th Middle School of Guangzhou.
