= Keishla He =

Puerto Rican social media personality

Keishla He (Chinese: 何嘉裟; born c. 2002) is a Puerto Rican social media personality who posts about her identity as a person of Asian descent in Puerto Rico. She also speaks out against xenophobia and racism related to the COVID-19 pandemic.

== Biography ==
He was raised in Puerto Rico. Her parents immigrated from China and opened a restaurant. Though Spanish was her primary language, she spoke Cantonese with her family, and learned English in school. She was the only Asian student at her Puerto Rican high school.

In 2020, she started posting Spanish-language videos on TikTok. She was inspired to speak out against the xenophobia and racism related to the COVID-19 pandemic. Her posts garnered additional views, in part, due to viewers' being surprised by her Spanish fluency. She began focusing her content on her identity as a person of Asian descent in Puerto Rico. By August 2020, she had 52.7 thousand followers on TikTok. This increased to 1.8 million by May 2022.
