= Wildlife corridor =

Connecting wild territories for animals

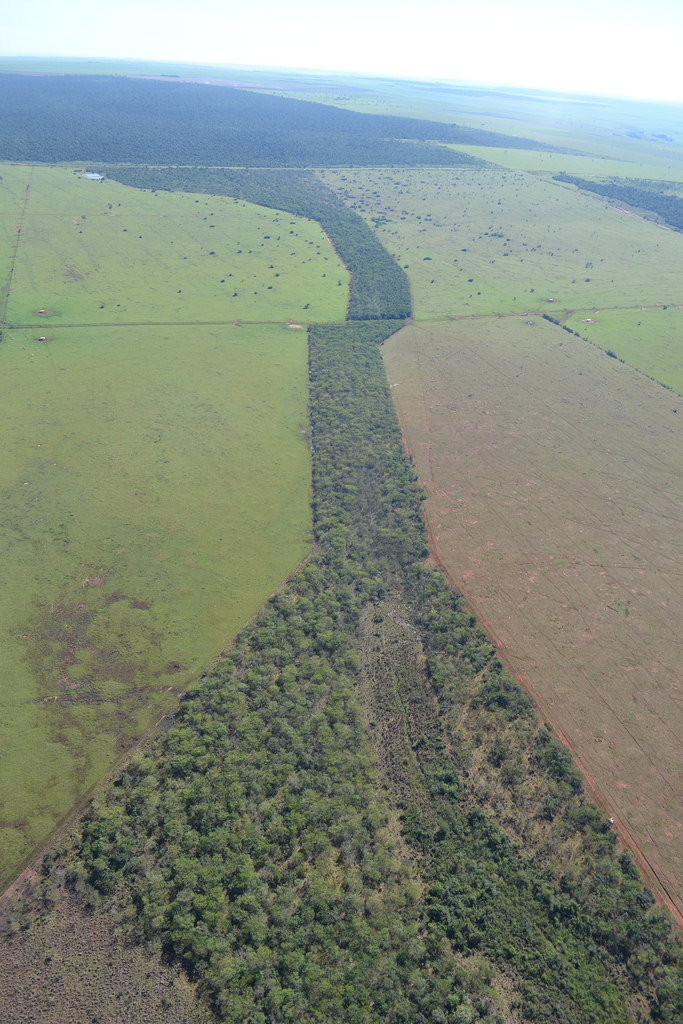
A wildlife corridor in Brazil.

A wildlife corridor, also known as a habitat corridor or green corridor, is an area that connects wildlife populations that have been separated by human activities or structures such as industrialization, expansion of agriculture, urbanization, road infrastructure, land clearings, and other development. Corridors mitigate the impacts of habitat fragmentation, meaning the division of habitat areas and restriction of movement, which has been caused by rapid urbanization and transport network expansion.

Habitat fragmentation from human development poses a significant threat to biodiversity, and wildlife corridors help to reduce the harmful effects of fragmentation and habitat degradation. By enabling the movement of individuals and populations, wildlife corridors help to prevent the negative effects of inbreeding and reduced genetic diversity that occur in isolated populations. Wildlife corridors also have effects on plant populations by increasing pollen and seed dispersal through animal movement between isolated habitat patches.

Additionally, corridors can support wildlife population resilience in the context of climate change adaptation, by connecting areas of warmer habitat to cooler habitat. Human settlements by corridors can allow for human-wildlife conflicts to increase, which requires mitigation measures.

== Purpose ==
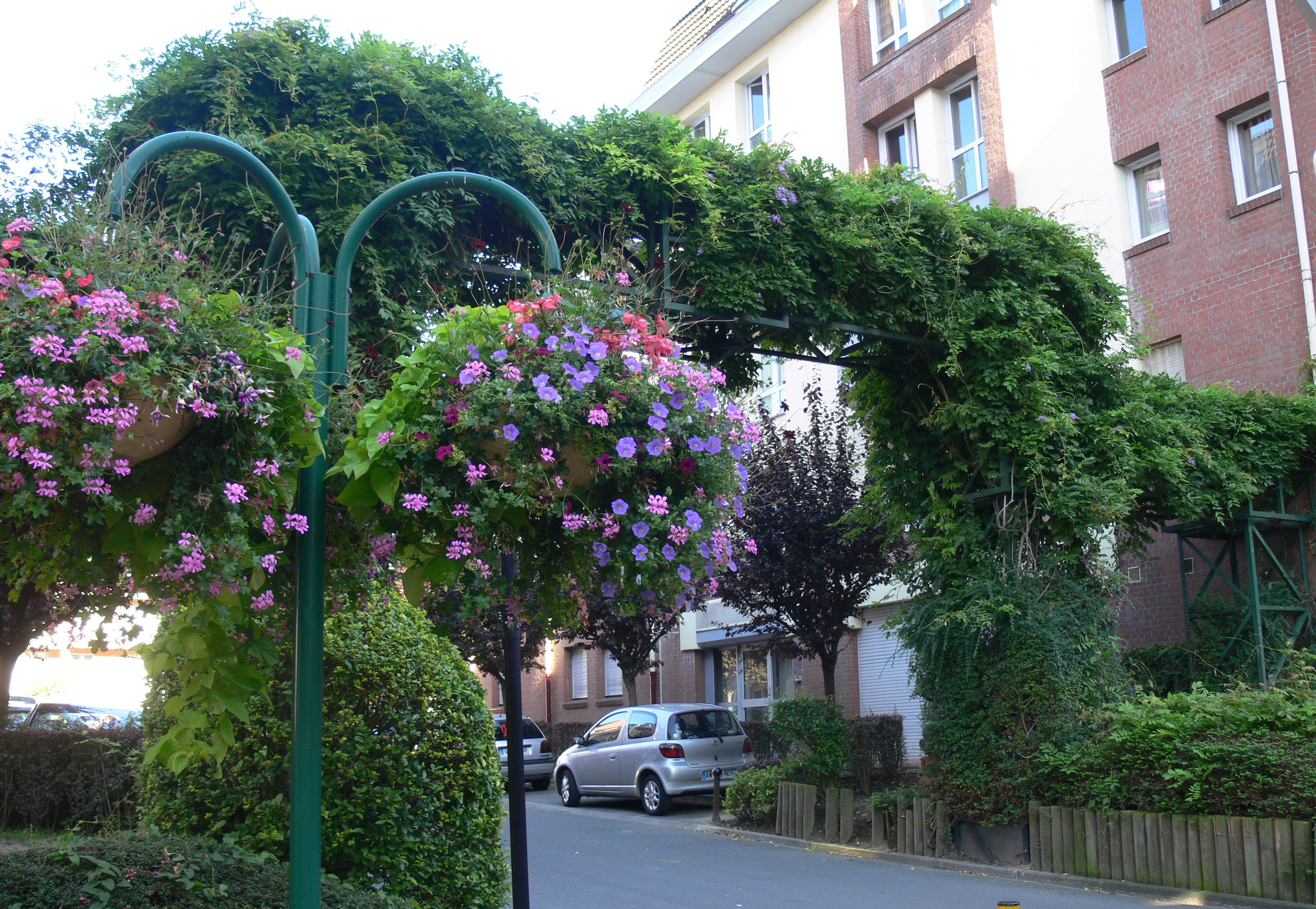
An urban green corridor in Lille.

Habitat corridors can be considered a management tool in areas where the destruction of natural habitats has impacted biodiversity. When land is fragmented, wildlife populations can become unstable or become isolated from larger populations. Habitat corridors as a management tool can be implemented by local communities and citizen's groups, ecologists, biologists, Indigenous groups, land managers, urban planners, and other stakeholders.

With climate change, corridors can also serve the purpose of connecting cooler areas of habitat with warmer areas of habitat, helping individuals and populations by facilitating movement as specie ranges shift with climate change. Corridors should be large enough to support minimum critical populations, reduce migration barriers, and maximize connectivity between populations.

Corridors help reconnect and stabilize fragmented populations by supporting key processes for biodiversity:

- Colonization: Animals can move and occupy new areas when food sources or other natural resources are scarce in their primary habitat.
- Migration: Species that relocate seasonally can do so more safely and effectively without interference from human development barriers.
- Interbreeding: Animals can find new mates in neighbouring regions, increasing genetic diversity.

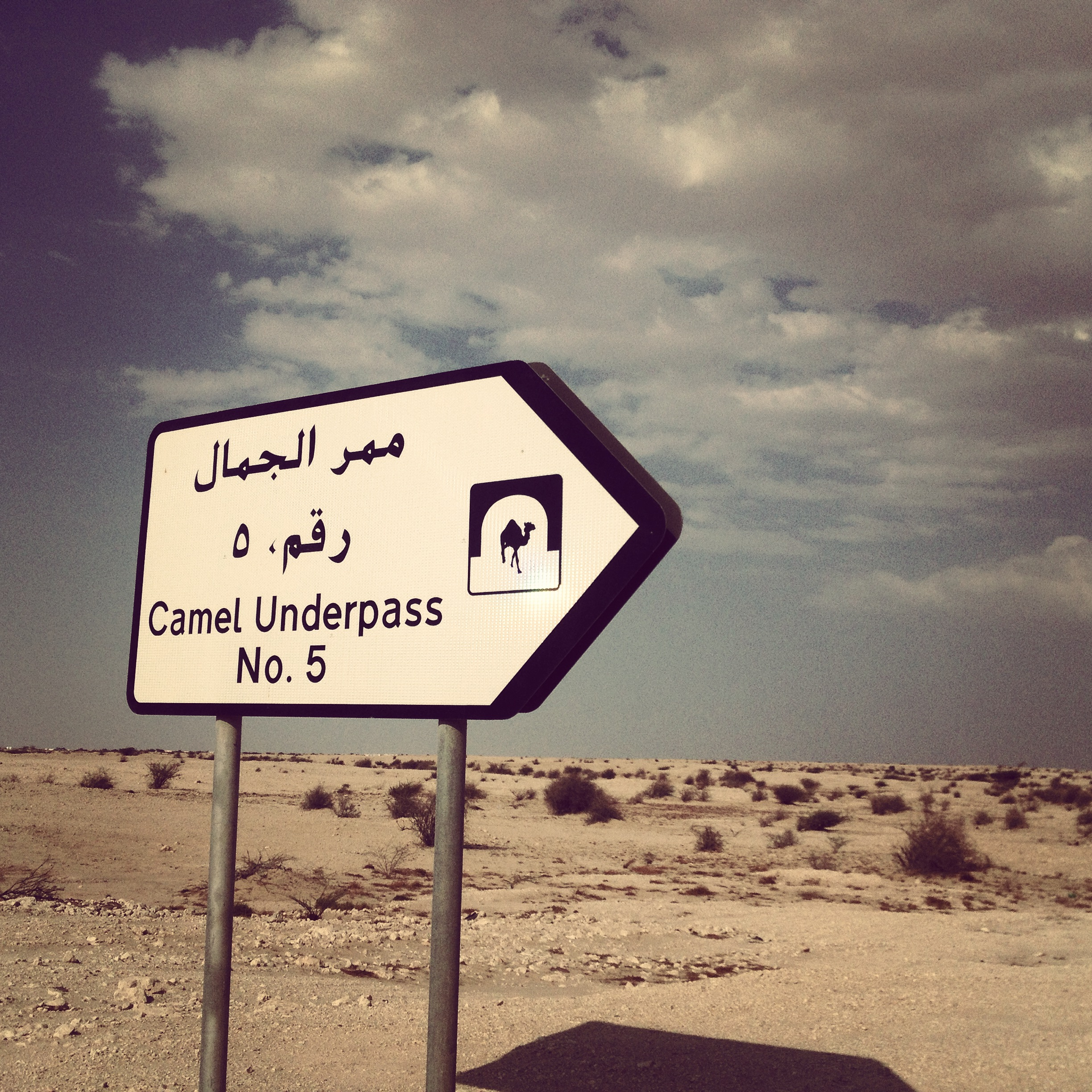
Sign on a highway in Qatar, indicating an underpass that allows camels to safely cross.

=== Definitions ===
Wildlife corridors have multiple definitions. They can be defined as any space that facilitates the movement of populations, individuals, and genetic exchange, as well as allow for the reproduction of plants. Other definitions include a linear landscape element (meaning an uninterrupted stretch of connected habitat); a pathway that animals with wide ranges can use to travel between different habitats, habitat where plants can propagate, or grow, and where genetic exchange can occur, where populations can move because of changes in their environment (i.e. due to wildfires, flooding, climate change), and where vulnerable species can have their populations be increased from other patches of habitat.

Wildlife corridors improve habitat connectivity, which can be defined as the extent to which flora and fauna, or plants and animals, can move between patches of habitat.

== Types of corridors ==
=== Size and continuity ===
Habitat corridors can be categorized based on their width, with wider corridors generally supporting greater wildlife use. However, the overall effectiveness of a corridor depends on its design as well as its width.

Habitat corridors can also be classified based on their continuity. Continuous corridors are uninterrupted strips of habitat, while "stepping stone" corridors consist of small, separate patches of suitable habitat.

=== Aquatic corridors ===
Wildlife corridors also include aquatic habitats, or riparian zones. Zones along rivers can act as wildlife corridors, facilitating movement of populations on land and in water. Removing in-stream barriers from aquatic habitat is a means of restoring aquatic connectivity within a river system, thereby increasing habitat extent for species.

=== Wildlife crossings ===
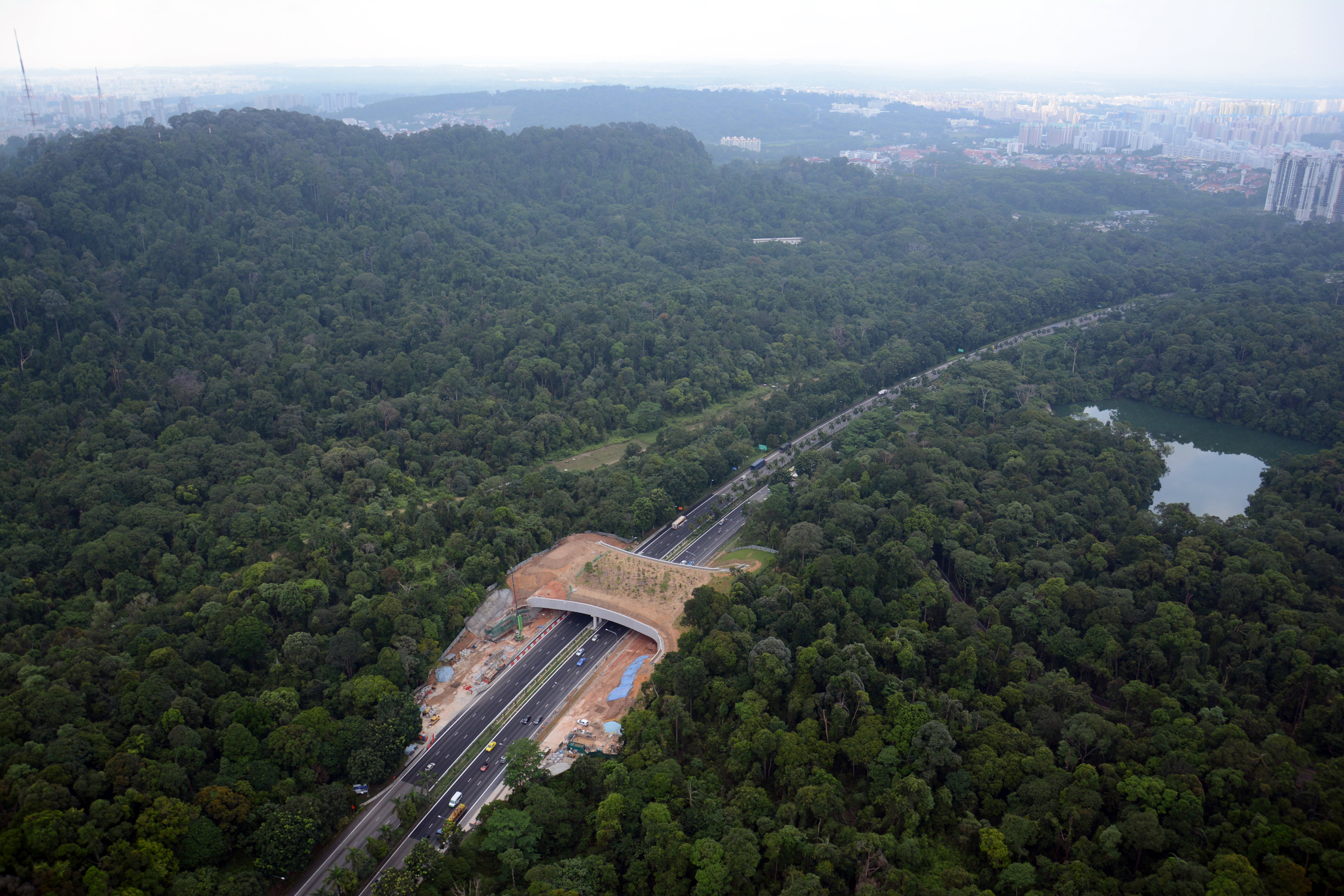
Wildlife crossing overpass in Singapore

Corridors can include wildlife crossings, such an underpasses or overpasses. These structures allow animals to cross human infrastructure (i.e. a highway, canal) which helps to reduce road mortality. Certain animals prefer the cover of an underpass, while others prefer an overpass.

Wildlife overpasses and underpasses are able to facilitate the movement of different kinds of species, because species exhibit preferences for different types of wildlife crossing infrastructure. For example, in Banff National Park, black bears and mountain lions have been observed to prefer wildlife underpasses, which provide a darker, visually protected way to cross the Trans-Canada Highway. Grizzly bears and large ungulates, such as elk, have been observed to prefer wildlife overpasses. Large ungulates and other carnivores exhibit stable, consistent use of the underpasses as well, while small ungulates were observed to have lower numbers in the underpasses between 2008-2018. Research in Banff National Park has shown that it may take a few years for wildlife to become habituated to using infrastructure such as overpasses and underpasses, but they do often become habituated.

=== Single small versus several large areas ===
Wildlife corridors can take multiple forms, including as an uninterrupted stretch of habitat or as a series of smaller patches of habitat. In conservation ecology, the SLOSS dilemma (whether to preserve single large [SL] areas of habitat or several small [SS] areas of habitat) has been discussed for decades. Large, contiguous areas of habitat, such as national parks, have often been the focus of conservation planning. However, in terms of the number of species preserved, numerous studies have found either that there is no difference between the two, or that providing linkages between many smaller areas of habitat, especially when connected to a large area of habitat, produces better conservation outcomes (i.e. supports more species).

In a wildlife corridor, preserving and connecting several small areas of habitat, otherwise known as 'stepping stones', can be beneficial for mitigating biodiversity loss and habitat fragmentation. As well, preserving and connecting many smaller patches of habitat can help with climate adaptation and genetic diversity. In forested areas, fragmentation can be mitigated by connecting good-quality 'stepping stone' habitats. To identify suitable small areas of habitat for a wildlife corridor, it is important to consider the distance to protected areas; existing habitat corridors in the area; determining which areas have many species; and which habitats are key biodiversity areas.

=== Urban wildlife corridors ===
Wildlife corridors can also be created in urban areas, such as cities and towns. Urban areas often coincide with areas of high biodiversity, and urbanization can impact biodiversity in numerous ways, including by changing wildlife behaviour, species richness, functional diversity, as well as genetic diversity. Urban areas generally have depleted biodiversity; however, many urban areas have high numbers of vascular plants. Corridors, whether they are linear, uninterrupted stretches of habitat, or whether they are 'stepping stones', can help to improve biodiversity in urban areas.

== Wildlife corridor usage ==
=== Corridor users ===
Most species can be categorized into one of two groups: passage users and corridor dwellers.

Passage users occupy corridors for brief periods, meaning they can cross the corridor over a few hours. Passage user use corridors for such events as seasonal migration, juvenile dispersal or moving between different parts of a large home range. Large herbivores, medium to large carnivores, and migratory species are typical passage users.

Corridor dwellers, on the other hand, can occupy a corridor for several years. Species such as plants, reptiles, amphibians, birds, insects, and small mammals may spend their entire lives in linear habitats. In such cases, the corridor must provide enough resources to support such species.

=== Monitoring wildlife use ===
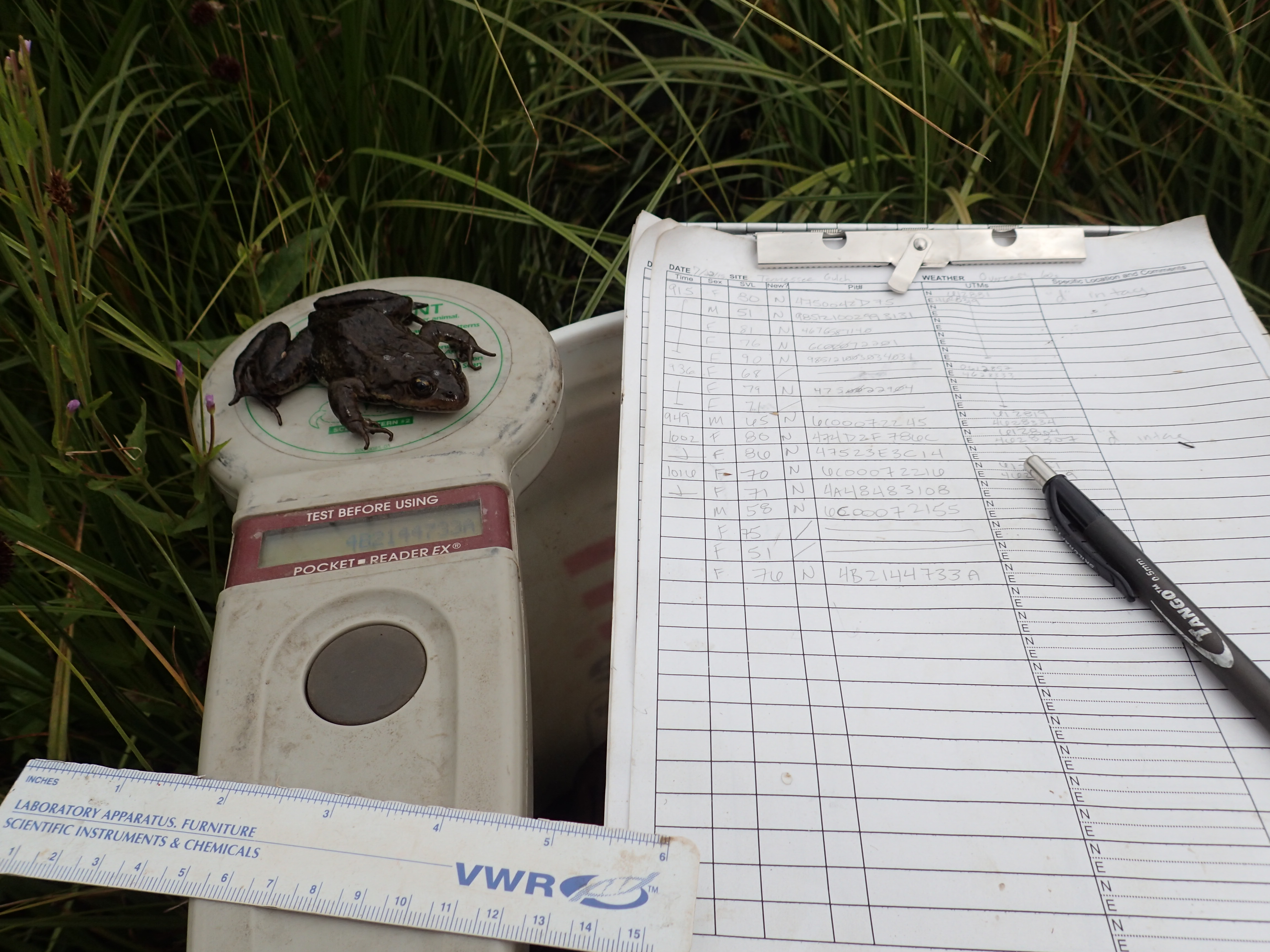
An example of a mark-recapture survey on an amphibian. Data on each collected individual is marked and the organism is late released back into the rest of the population.

In wildlife corridors, researchers can use mark-recapture techniques and hair snares to assess genetic flow and observe how wildlife utilizes corridors. Marking and recapturing animals helps track individual movement.

Researchers can also use genetic testing to evaluate migration and mating patterns. By analyzing gene flow within a population, researchers can better understand the long-term role of wildlife corridors in migration and genetic diversity.

Monitoring animal use of wildlife corridors can also be done using technologies that are accessible for citizen science. For monitoring bird populations, for example, using a combination of the applications eBird and i-Tree can be useful.

As well, monitoring animal use can be done by evaluating data provided by camera traps.

== Corridor planning ==
=== Corridor design ===
Wildlife corridors are effective when designed with consideration of ecology, including factors such as seasonal movement, avoidance behaviour, dispersal patterns, and specific habitat requirements.

Corridor design may improve biodiversity when it includes some degree of randomness or asymmetry and is oriented perpendicular to habitat patches. However, this design may lead to edge effects, where habitat quality along the edge of a habitat fragment is often lower than in core habitat areas.

Fencing is something to be considered in the design of wildlife corridor infrastructure, as a tool that often complements overpasses and underpasses along road corridors, thereby reducing road mortality. Since fencing along a whole road is currently not always doable, it is important to add fencing to areas where there is high road mortality of animals. In wildlife fencing design, there are discussions on whether it is better to have many short or a few long fences. It may be less effective to have many short fences along a road corridor, as animals are able to move around the barriers more easily, thus increasing their chance of mortality.

=== Corridor implementation ===
Wildlife corridors can be developed in tandem with numerous and diverse stakeholders, such as the public, local communities, water districts, recreation departments, non-governmental organizations, public agencies, landowners, etc. In order to successfully implement wildlife corridors, a shared goal and vision between these stakeholders and partners is important. A clear set of rules and regulations governing the wildlife corridor, incentive programs for encouraging the private sector to support the corridor, in addition to research that outlines priority areas for corridors (including areas of high-quality habitat and areas near other corridors) is important for habitat connectivity implementation.

== Indigenous knowledge ==
The expansion of development into natural areas impacts human and non-humans life. Attempts to restore habitat over time require support from the local communities that surround the habitat that a restoration project is being completed in, including Indigenous communities.

Widespread efforts that actively involve the input of a variety of groups are not always used in ecological restoration efforts. Indigenous knowledge of the natural world is often substituted with settler ideas of landscape ecology when developing wildlife corridor plans, including in large-scale landscape conservation. This can lead to differences in determining where wildlife populations are found, species composition, as well as seasonal patterns and changes. Indigenous ideas of mobility hold that being able to make decisions around movement helps produce Indigenous relationality. Indigenous ideas of relationality, or "expansive Indigenous modes of relationship", can offer insight for future developments in large-scale landscape conservation and connectivity. For example, rhetoric around the Yellowstone to Yukon Conservation Initiative has described the initiative as a new paradigm, when large-scale landscape conservation is already practiced by Indigenous people (i.e. the Flathead Nation's stewardship of bison across wide ranges, cultivating "expansive relationality"). Concerns over connectivity rhetoric being settler-oriented are a feature of the Land Back movement.

Managing terrestrial and aquatic lands can have a positive impact on Indigenous groups that rely on wildlife populations for cultural practices, such as fishing and hunting. Many Indigenous groups manage wildlife populations, yet can have limited finances to manage large swathes of habitat. In Canada, in 2025, the national parks organization, Parks Canada, and the province of British Columbia, announced $8 million in funding for wildlife corridors and Indigenous stewardship. Also in Canada, a Mi'kmaw organization in Nova Scotia received $491,000 from Parks Canada's National Program for Ecological Corridors, in order to steward wildlife corridors on the landscape.

== Human-wildlife conflict ==
Corridors can coincide with areas of human settlements, which can produce conflict between wildlife and people. Human-wildlife conflict, caused by the degradation of wildlife habitat and resource competition, can take the form of road mortality, crop raiding, livestock predation, as well as human injury and death. In India, for example, many corridors connecting larger patches of habitat also overlap with human settlements, including rural communities. Local citizens respond to this conflict in numerous ways, including through poisoning animals, trapping them, or otherwise killing or harming them. This behaviour can undermine conservation gains.

Different strategies have been introduced to mitigate human-wildlife conflict. For example, in India, fencing off areas, translocating animals, and sterilizing wildlife has been attempted. These practices are often expensive and physically demanding.

Incentives for improving attitudes towards wildlife corridors are another means of mitigating human-wildlife conflict. These include direct payments for ecosystem services (PES), which is a financial incentive that encourages landholders, farmers, etc. to adopt practices that reduce human-wildlife conflict.

Other techniques for minimizing human-wildlife conflict include exist. In parts of Africa and Asia, strategic communal guarding systems, whereby farmers make teams and alert one another to the presence of an animal, i.e. an elephant, allows community members to make noise to encourage the animal to leave the area. This systemic approach can help to decrease crop damage.

== Examples ==
The network of wildlife overpasses and underpasses in Banff National Park in Alberta, Canada, was launched in the 1980s to minimize wildlife collisions along the Trans-Canada Highway. The network includes six overpasses and 38 underpasses. Created by Parks Canada, the project spans over 180 kilometres along the Trans-Canada Highway, and has reduced wildlife collisions by 80%. The overpasses and underpasses have been observed to be used more than 200,000 times by a wide variety of species, including the red fox, hoary marmot, snakes, and boreal toads. Road mortality in large carnivores is between 50-100% lower than before the creating of the corridor infrastructure, and the road mortality rate for ungulates such as elk are close to 0%. The overpasses are planted with trees and native grasses, with fences on either side to help guide animals and prevent them from crossing the highway itself.

In 2001, a wolf corridor was restored through a golf course in Jasper National Park, Alberta, which showed frequent use by the wolf population.

The wildlife corridor along the Delhi-Mumbai Expressway, near the Ranthambore Tiger Reserve, contains a 3.5 kilometre wildlife overpass network, with each segment about 500 metres long. The project, constructed by the National Highway Authority of India (NHAI) also consists of a 1.2 kilometre underpass. As of 2026 it was partially completed.

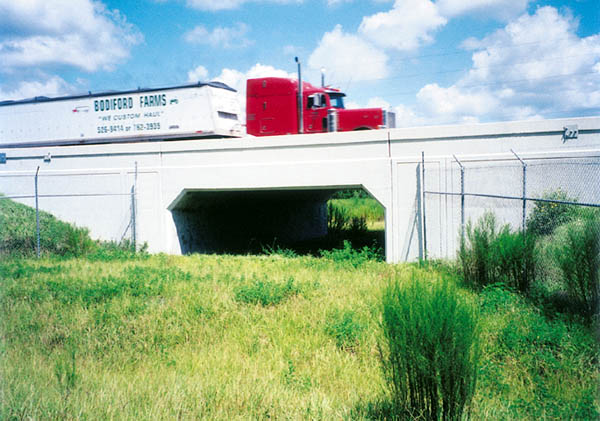
Florida

=== Corridors as existing infrastructure ===
In Southern California, 15 underpasses and drainage culverts were observed to see how many animals used them as corridors. They were effective on carnivores, mule deer, small mammals, and reptiles, even though the corridors were not intended specifically for animals. Researchers learned that factors such as surrounding habitat, underpass dimensions, and human activity played a role in the frequency of usage of existing human infrastructure.

=== Corridor experiments ===
In a corridor ecology experiment in South Carolina, in the United States, five remnant areas of land were monitored for butterfly movement and plant reproduction. The areas consisted of a central area, four habitat patches around the central area, and a wildlife corridor between the central area and one of the habitat patches. Butterflies that were placed in the central habitat area were two to four times more likely to move to the patch connected by the wildlife corridor than to the disconnected habitat patches. Male holly plants were also placed in the central habitat area, and female holly plants in the connected patch had 70% higher seed production compared to female holly plants plants in the habitat patches not connected by a wildlife corridor. Plant seed dispersal through bird droppings was noted to be the dispersal method with the largest increase within the corridor-connected patch of land.

=== Legislating corridors ===
In the United States, the Florida Wildlife Corridor act was passed in June 2021, securing a network of nearly 18 million acres of connected ecosystems. Starting from the Alabama border, through the Florida panhandle to the Florida Keys, the corridor contains state parks, national forests, wildlife management areas, agricultural land, and ranches.

=== Urban corridors ===
The Darlington Ecological Corridor in Montreal, Canada is an example of an urban ecological corridor. The corridor connects Mount Royal, a park in the centre of the city, to a railway corridor, via the Côte-des-Neiges-Notre-Dame-de-Grâce borough. The corridor began development in 2014, as an initiative between Université de Montréal researchers, the borough, and other stakeholders such as Éco-Pivot, a local group that supports urban greening. The corridor was conceived as a project to support the fox population on Mount Royal, but expanded to include multiple stakeholders and perspectives. The corridor includes community food gardens, roadside pollinator gardens, and natural stormwater management through rain gardens. The project seeks to help restore biodiversity in Montreal and also to improve food security.

The Mont Boullé Ecological Corridor in Jean Drapeau Park on Île-Ste-Hélène in Montreal, Canada, is another example of an urban ecological corridor. In 2023, the Park began the project of creating a dense forest on the island, with over 27,000 plants (including small plants, shrubs, and trees). The project includes the elimination of invasive species, constructing walkways to protect new vegetation, improving rainwater filtration by creating a 334 square-metre plant-filled valley with optimal conditions for water infiltration; restoring historic stoneworks and trails; adding infrastructure for human use, such as water fountains; and protecting nearby archeological sites.

=== Other wildlife corridors ===
- Paséo Pantera (also known as the Mesoamerican Biological Corridor or Paséo del Jaguar), terminated in 2018 due to financing limitations
- European Green Belt
- Yukon to Yellowstone Conservation Initiative in the Americas
- National Ecological Network is a network of corridors and habitats created for wildlife in the Netherlands
- Kanha-Pench corridor by the NH 44 in India
- Terai Arc Landscapes, in the Lower Himalayan Region
- Banff National Park network of wildlife corridors, in Canada

== See also ==
- Colored walls or corridors
  - Aquatic organism passage
  - Emerald network
  - Wildlife crossing, green crossing
- Area and links
  - Biolink zones
  - Linear park
  - Marine Protected Area
  - The Pollinator Pathway
  - Landscape connectivity
- Habitat
  - Habitat conservation
  - Habitat destruction
- Road ecology
