= Pang Chai-sip =

Pang Chai-sip (彭濟涉; 1914–2005) was a Hong Kong artist of the Lingnan school (嶺南畫派) of Chinese painting. Born in Guangdong, Pang started his life in art as a student at the Art Institute of Guangzhou (廣州市立美術學院), where he learnt painting and philosophy under teachers like Li Yanshan, Li Jinfa (李金髮), Chao Shao-an, Huang Junbi (黃君璧) and Li Xiongcai (黎雄才).

During World War II, Pang fled from warfare and settled in Hong Kong. In 1958, Lingnan-style painters including Li Yanshan, Chao Shao-an, and Pang founded the Hong Kong Chinese Art Club (香港中國美術會) with the view to promote Chinese arts in Hong Kong.

Pang worked as illustrator for Great Wall Movie Enterprise Limited (長城電影製片公司), where he contributed his illustrations to a few dozen Hong Kong movies, including The Awful Truth (1950) and A Bachelor is Born (1952).

In his late years, Pang founded the Chai-Sip Art Studio (濟涉畫院), where he offered painting classes to the public and trained talented young painters. At the same time, took charge of Chinese painting programs for Fung Kai Secondary School (鳳溪第一中學) in Sheung Shui. He had hundreds of students, and talented Chinese painters have developed their skills under his tutelage.

Pang painted for over half a century beginning with his apprenticeship in the Art Institute of Guangzhou, and his paintings have reached the public through numerous exhibitions, stretching his wings to Taiwan, Singapore, Malaysia, Australia, and the United Kingdom.

== Biography ==
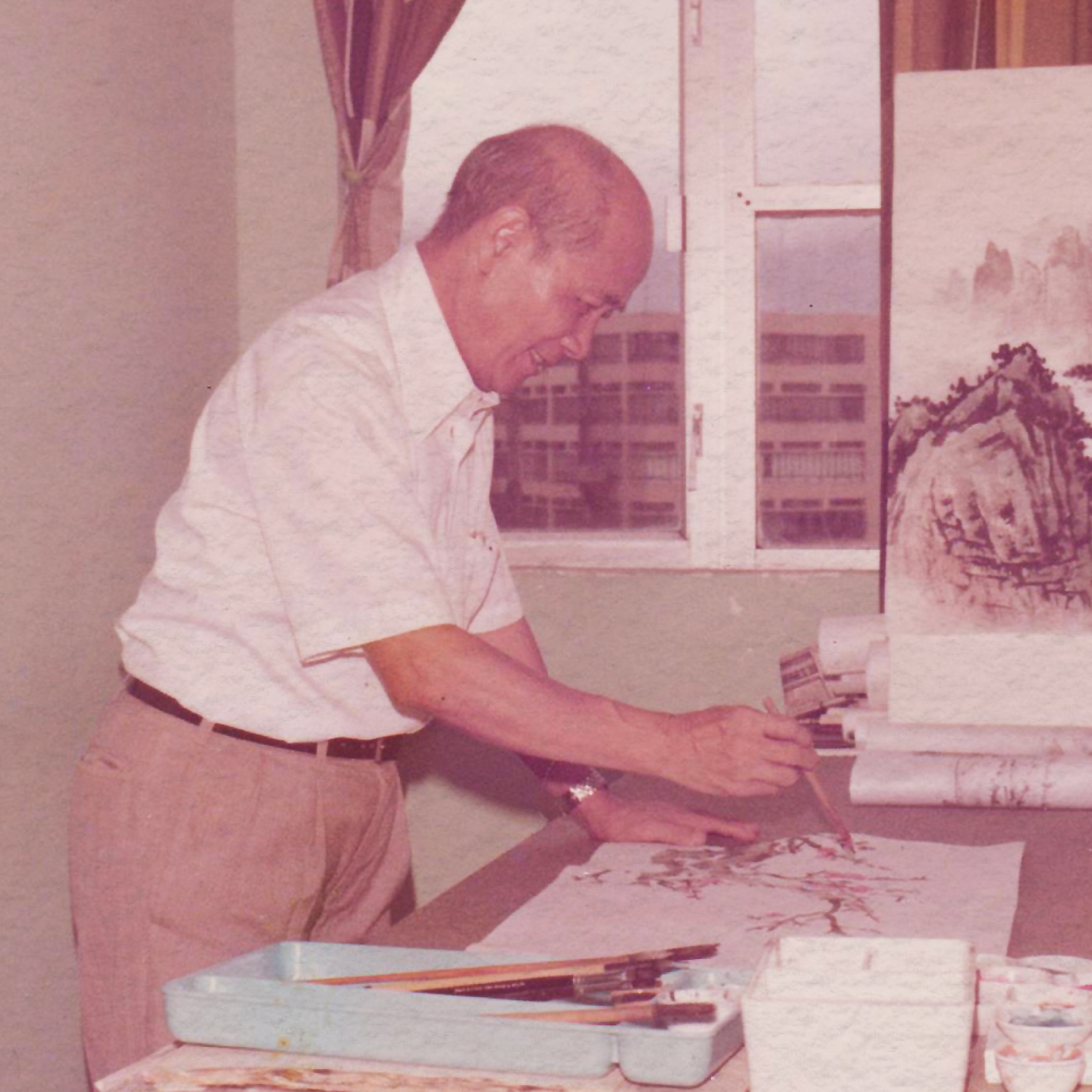
Chai-Sip Art Studio

Pang started his career as an artist in the Art Institute of Guangzhou. Li Jinfa, the principal of the institute, aimed to develop the institute and influence the art scene in China at that time. With the help of the legendary Lingnan style master Gao Jianfu, Chao Shao-an accepted the invitation to join the institute and be the head of the Faculty of Chinese Painting. Following Chao were iconic Lingnan style painters like Su Wonong (蘇臥農), Ye Yongqing (業永青), and Li Xiongcai, who turned to be instructors of the faculty. With these instructors, the Art Institute of Guangzhou turned to be the cradle of talented Lingnan style Chinese painters.

Among talented students, Pang has been a name that was mentioned around instructors for his skills and talent. He spent his apprenticeship flourishing his painting skills with the virtuosos, and often he visited Master Gao Jianfu to learn about the precious tips of drawing iconic creatures in Chinese paintings, i.e. birds, fish, insects and flowers. Chao, who favoured and later became good friends with Pang, had often offered his calligraphy as a present for Pang’s exhibitions.

During the WWII, the Art Institute of Guangzhou was forced to vacate and cease operations due to warfare. Instructors and students like Li Yanshan, Chao Shao-an, Pang and many others fled and settled in Hong Kong. To carry on the spirit of the Art Institute, Li, Chao, and Pang founded the Hong Kong Chinese Art Club (香港中國美術會), and Pang became a member of the club's executive committee.

While life of an artist was not ascertained in Hong Kong, Pang has struggled for survival with his family during his early days in Hong Kong. He has hidden his ambition in art and painting, joined Great Wall Movie Enterprise Limited (長城電影製片公司) and became an illustrator for Hong Kong movies. His illustrations appeared in dozens of Hong Kong movies, including The Awful Truth (說謊世界, 1950), A Bachelor is Born (方帽子, 1952), and others.

A few years later, Pang left the movie industry and started his career as a teacher. While being a teacher in Kowloon Tong School (九龍塘學校) and Fanling Public School, Pang picked his ambition and dream up again and spent most of his spare time in painting, travelling to natural scenery and launching Chinese painting classes to teach the talented. In late years, Pang started the Chai-Sip Art Studio (濟涉畫院), which was his platform to flourish his paintings, to teach gifted youngsters painting techniques and the public about the appreciation of Chinese paintings.

Pang's low-profile and simple character may have hindered his fame in the Chinese painting scene. Yet he was passionate about Chinese painting. For more than 50 years, he continuously painted, ending with a rich collection of more than a few hundred paintings, now treasured cared for by his family. The style of his painting evolved with time, never following tides of trends. Rather, they could be seen as pure expressions of his creativity in painting perspectives and formations, his passion for nature and his love for the simple countryside lifestyle.

Pang's paintings have travelled to different continentals throughout the years, in which hundreds and thousands of visitors and collectors have seen his work of art in his exhibitions in Taiwan, Singapore, Malaysia, Australia and the United Kingdom.

In November 2014, Pang’s family and the Hong Kong Chinese Art Club jointly organized an exhibition in memory of Mr. Pang Chai Sip, which involved paintings of Pang back in 1937, and scrolls of early works of Pang. Hundreds of visitors came and joined the 3-day event to express their love and appreciation of the artist.

== Appreciations from the art scene ==
Chao wrote a poem commemorating Pang’s painting – "With his paint we see the marvels of the nature, with his strokes we feel the emotions behind the bushes; with his brushes we are startled with the beauty of the mysterious haze, with Pang the world is just his painting." (「萬水千山造化工，幾株疏柳入空濛，烟雲出沒多變幻，都在彭君筆墨中。」) This showed Chao's appreciation for Pang's perspectives and skills and the atmosphere created through his painting.
