= Lingnan School =

Chinese art movement

Example works by the three Lingnan founders

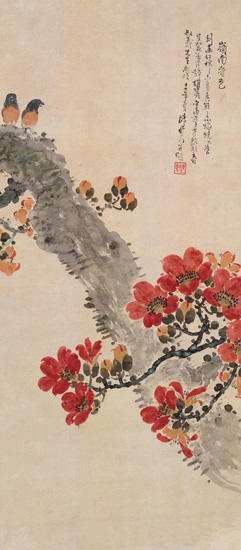
Spring Scene in Lingnan (Chen Shuren, 1928)

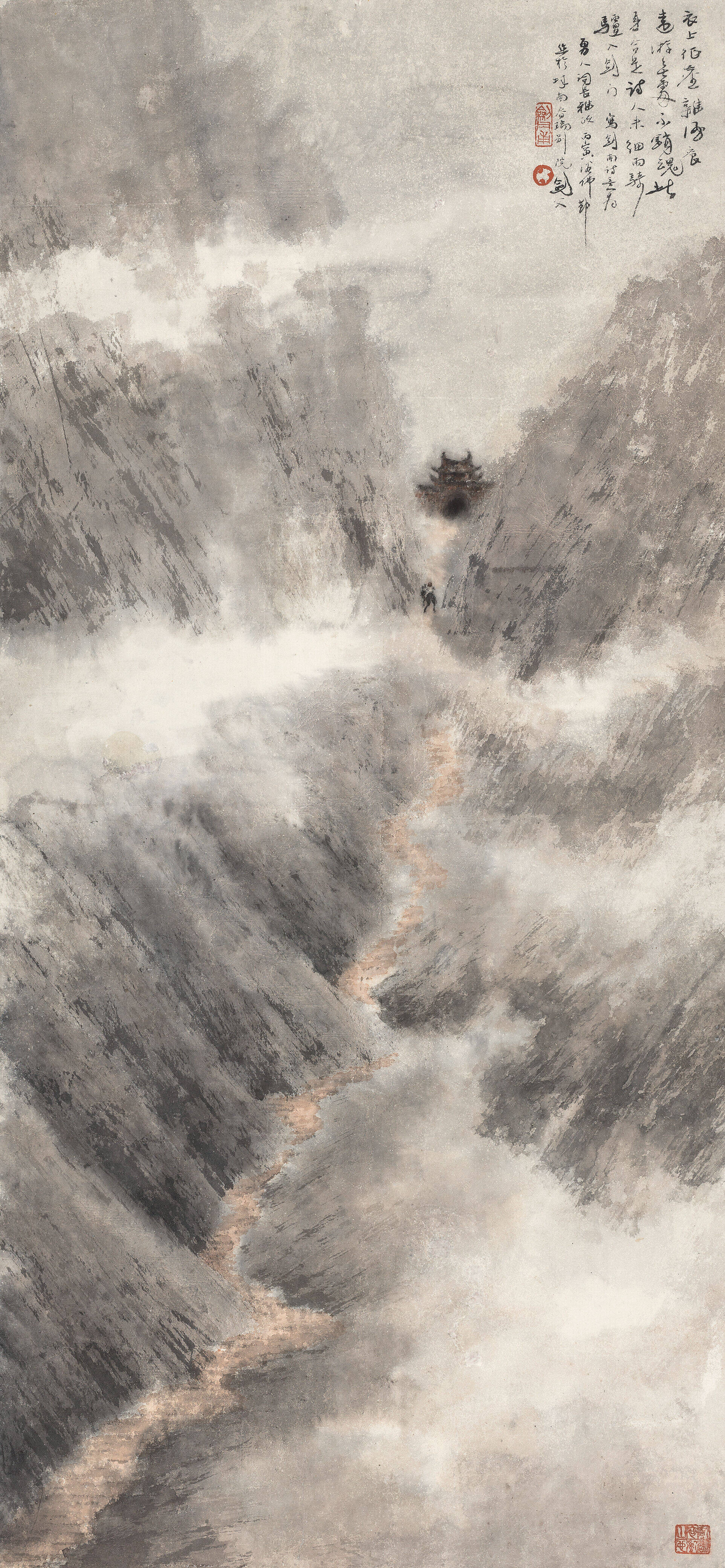
Landscape (Gao Jianfu, 1926)

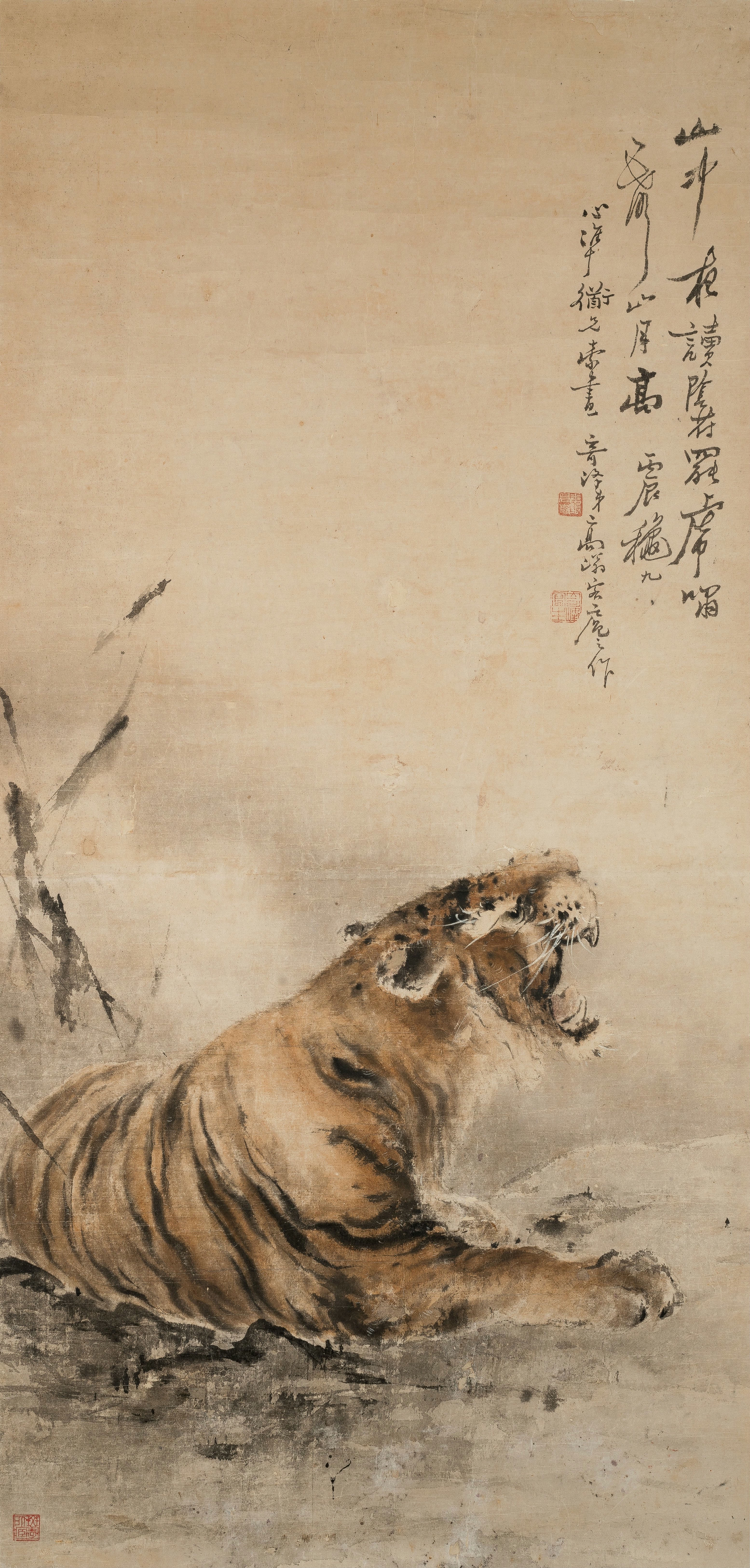
The Roar of the Night (Gao Qifeng, 1916)

The Lingnan School (traditional Chinese: 嶺南畫派; simplified Chinese: 岭南画派; pinyin: Lǐngnán huà pài) was an art movement active in the late Qing dynasty and Republic of China that sought to modernize Chinese painting through borrowing from other artistic traditions. Established by brothers Gao Jianfu and Qifeng, together with fellow artist Chen Shuren, the Lingnan School has been considered one of the major art movements of 20th-century Chinese painting.

The Gao brothers and Chen were influenced by the teachings of Ju Lian, including the "boneless" technique. They subsequently travelled to Japan, where they learned Western techniques of perspective and colour through the syncretic Nihonga school of painting; these influences remained prevalent throughout their lives. The men joined the Tongmenghui, an anti-Qing nationalist organization with which their movement was closely associated. Returning to China in the late 1900s, the Gaos and Chen participated in the 1911 revolution. Chen later returned to Japan for further study, though the three collaborated on spreading their idea of a "New National Painting" that combined Chinese and foreign influences. Exhibitions and teaching positions allowed them to further promulgate their approach to art, and, by the 1930s, the Lingnan School had broad acceptance and support with the Kuomintang government. Chen, the Gaos, and their students participated in national and international art exhibitions into the mid-1930s. However, during the Second Sino-Japanese War, the movement fell from prominence due to its Japanese influences. Students of the Gaos continued the movement after the Chinese Civil War, both in mainland China and in Hong Kong and Taiwan. Subsequent generations have also been active in British Columbia, Canada.

Stylistically, the Lingnan School was marked by a blending of traditional Chinese approaches and Western techniques, as mediated by Japanese understandings. These included matters of lighting and atmosphere, as well as depictions of subjects rarely found in earlier Chinese works. Members of the movement also had marked differences; Gao Jianfu favoured atmospheric landscapes, Gao Qifeng realistic pictures of large animals, and Chen Shuren delicate bird-and-flower scenes. Subsequent generations of painters varied stylistically and thematically.

== Definition ==
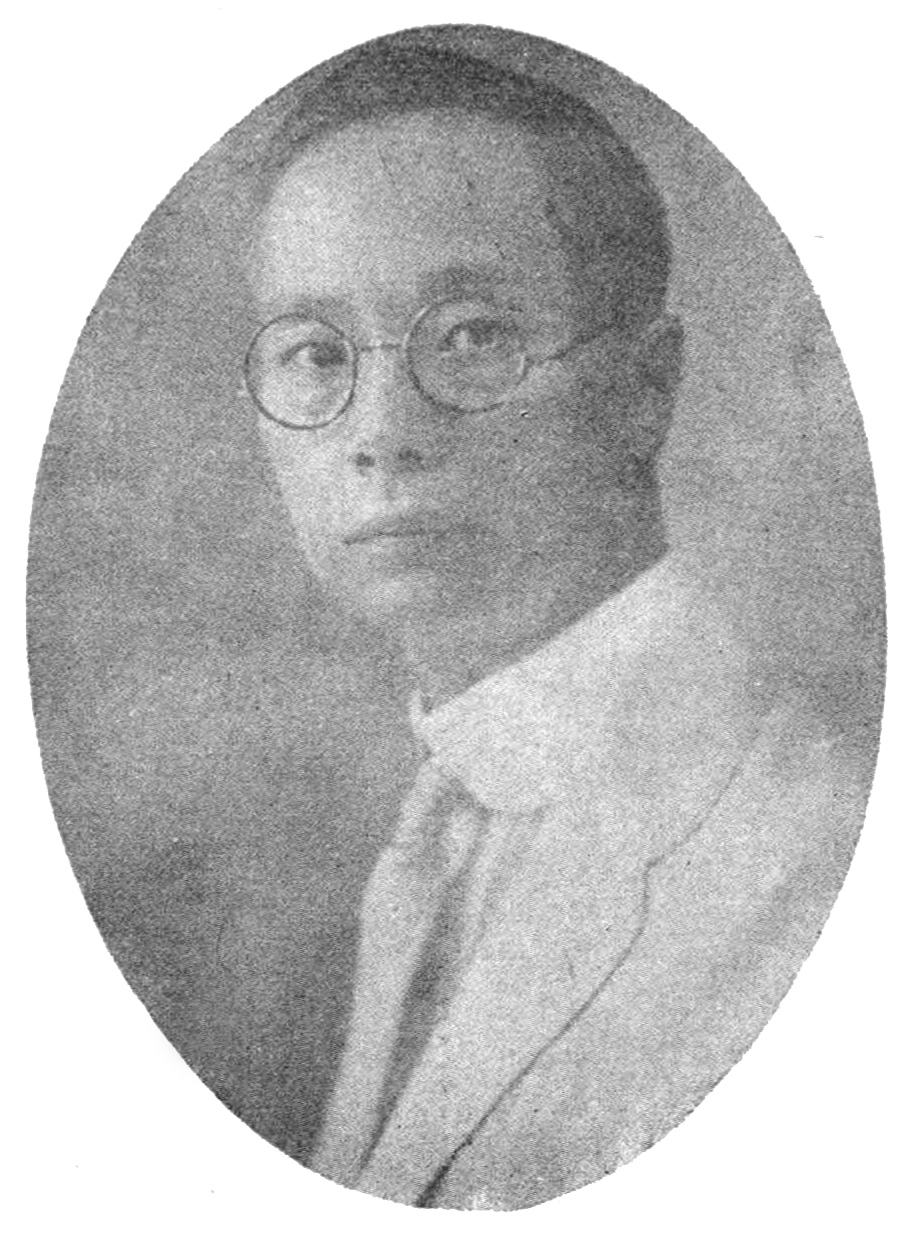
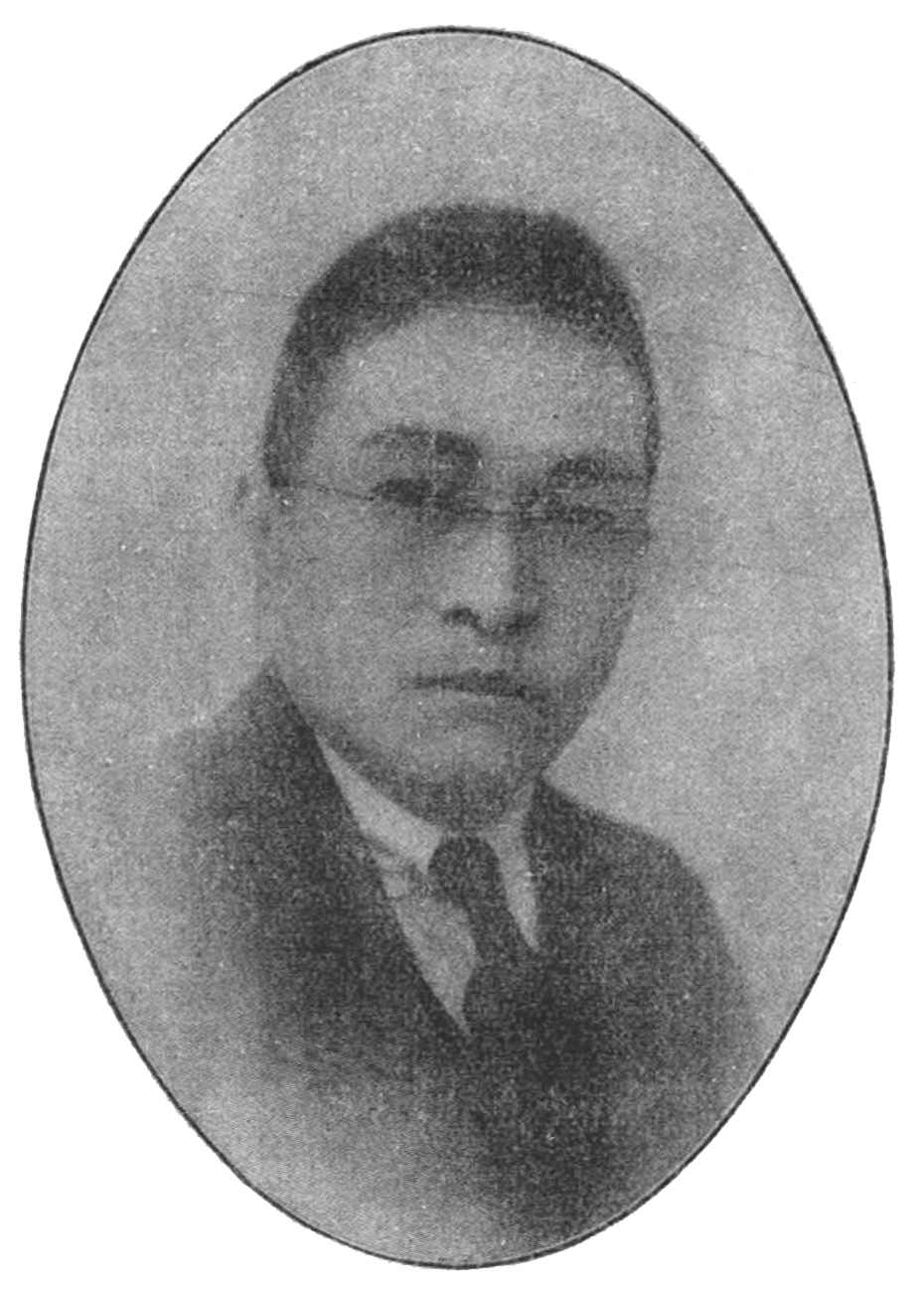
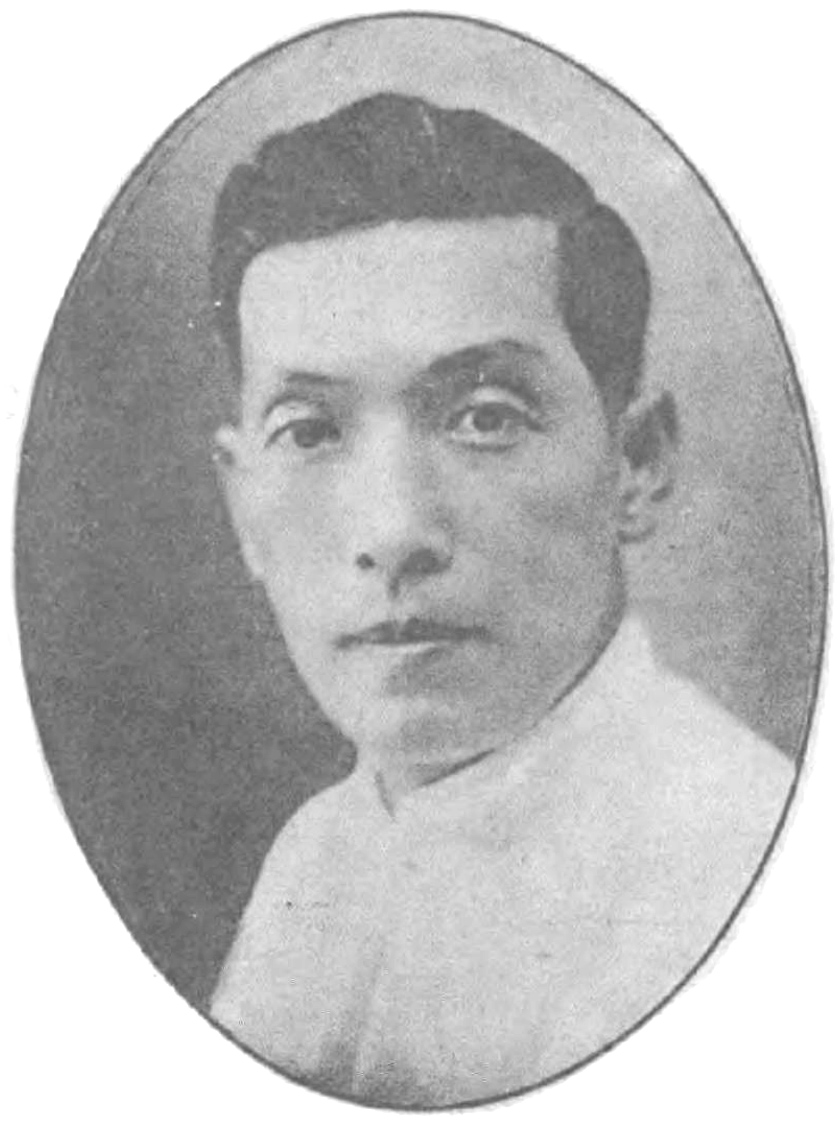
The three founders of the Lingnan School: Chen Shuren, Gao Jianfu, and Gao Qifeng

The Lingnan School was an art movement initiated by Gao Jianfu, his brother Gao Qifeng, and their peer Chen Shuren, who are collectively known in Chinese as the "Three Masters of Lingnan" (岭南三杰). The common name for the movement is derived from the term Lingnan, a traditional toponym for the area south of the Nanling Mountains; it refers to the Guangdong origin of the movement's founders. This name was not used by the artists themselves, who initially identified their movement as "New National Painting" (新国画; 新國畫). The movement has also been known as the "eclectic" (折衷派) school. Meanwhile, the term Lingnan may be used more generally to refer to artists from the region who are unassociated with the school.

The Lingnan School sought to promote a new style of painting that both advanced realism and continued the lineage of Chinese painting. As such, although it built on Chinese techniques and styles, both modern and ancient, the movement was characterized by extensive borrowing from other artistic traditions. In lectures, Gao Jianfu described his approach to painting as drawing from foreign traditions while retaining traditional elements, thereby maintaining a distinctive identity. Arguing that complete Westernization was impossible, Gao called for a "universal syncretism" that took the useful elements of foreign art from all sources – be it Egyptian, European, Indian, or Persian. Gao Qifeng similarly described his approach in one lecture:

I [...] picked out the finest points of Western art, such as the masterful strokes of the pen, composition, inking, coloring, inspiring background, poetic romance, etc. and applied them to my Chinese techniques. In short, I tried to retain what was exquisite in the Chinese art of painting, and at the same time to adopt the best methods of composition which the world's art schools had to offer, thereby blending the East and the West into a harmonious whole. (Note: Gao Qifeng provided this explanation during one of his courses at Lingnan University. It is recorded in Collected Paintings by the Late Gao Qifeng (高奇峰先生遺畫集, 1935). Translation by Chu (1998, pp. 67–68))

== History ==
=== Beginnings in Guangdong ===
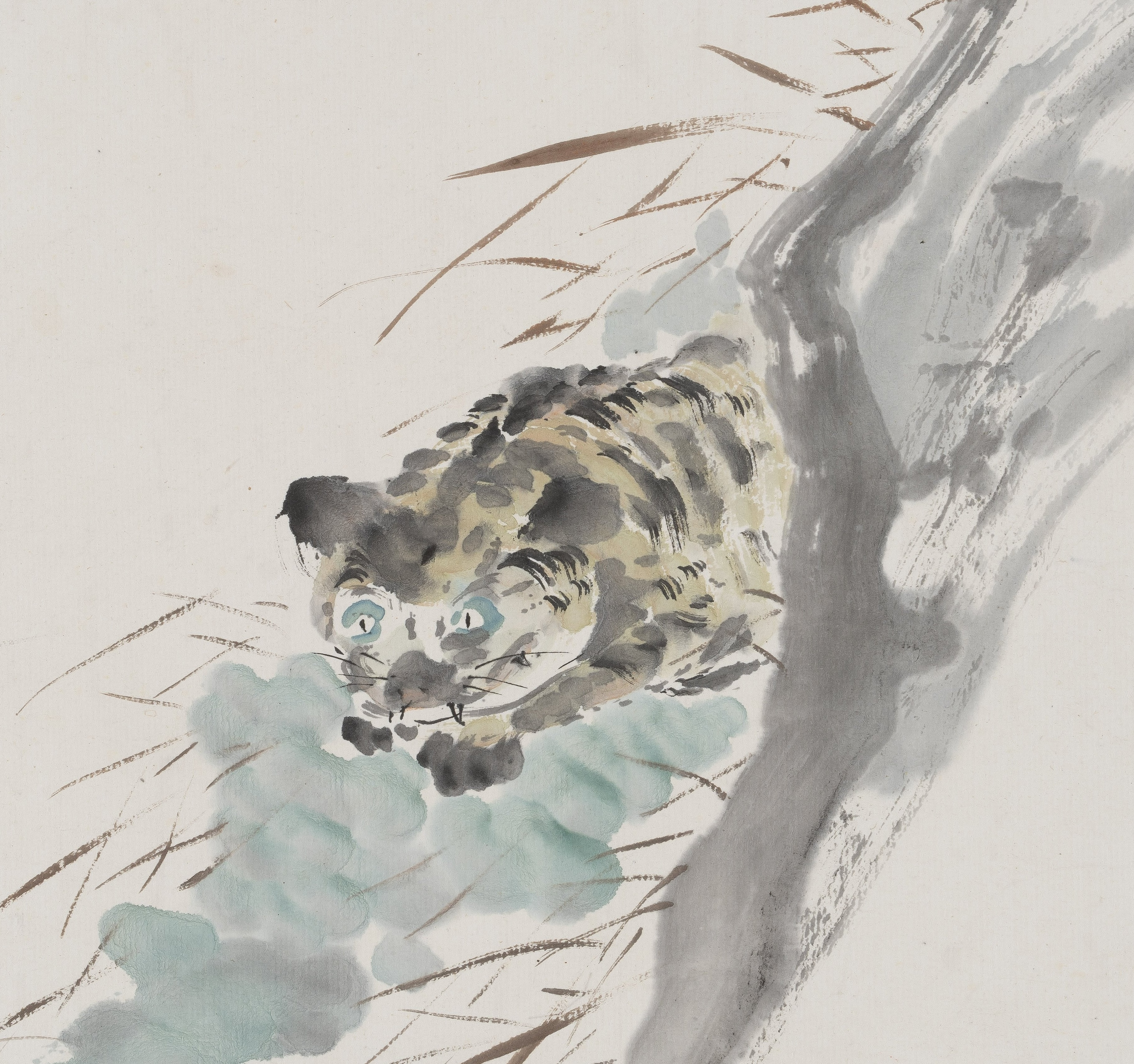
Ju Lian, Reclining Tiger (1886, detail); the "boneless" technique he taught influenced the Lingnan School.

The founders of the Lingnan School drew from the artistic traditions of Panyu District, Guangdong, in the late 19th century. A centre of Cantonese art, Panyu was the home of the Ju family of artists, which included Ju Chao and Ju Lian. These artists had been influenced by Song Guangbao and Meng Jinyi, painters from Jiangsu who had toured Guangdong in the early 19th century; both were bird-and-flower painters, with Song being an advocate of the "boneless" style of creating forms without outlines and Meng a literati painter who sought to capture the essence of a subject. Ju Chao interacted extensively with both artists during the 1840s and later taught their techniques to Ju Lian; the former drew more from Song, while the latter considered himself a blend of both Song and Meng.

By the 1890s, Ju Lian had established the Xiaoyue Qin Pavilion (Hall of the Whispering Lute) in the village of Lishan, Panyu. This hall was a combination studio and art school, wherein Ju taught disciples and provided board when necessary. Among these students was Gao Jianfu, the orphaned son of a local family who enroled in 1892, and Chen Shuren, from a wealthy family, who began his studies in 1900. (Note: Chen would later marry Ju Lian's grand-niece Ruowen (Liu & Hsu 2013, p. 26).) During their studies, the two struck up a friendship that would last the rest of their lives. Gao Qifeng has also been identified as having studied under Ju Lian, though the historian Ralph Croizier argues that, given available records, any such studies would have been brief if they occurred at all.

Ju Lian died in 1904, by which point the three founders of the Lingnan School had left Panyu. Gao Jianfu enroled at the Canton Christian College (now part of Sun Yat-sen University) in Guangdong. He also spent time under the patronage of fellow Ju Lian student Wu Deyi, took lessons in Western art from a French painter known in Chinese as Mai La, (Note: The name of this painter is not known; he is identified in records only as Mai La (Sullivan 1996, p. 52).) and discussed art with the Japanese artist Yamamoto Baigai; the latter encouraged him to travel to Japan for further study. Gao Qifeng followed his brother to Guangzhou, studying at a Christian school while apprenticing as a lampshade painter. Chen Shuren travelled to Hong Kong and became involved in the anti-Qing movement.

=== Japanese influences ===
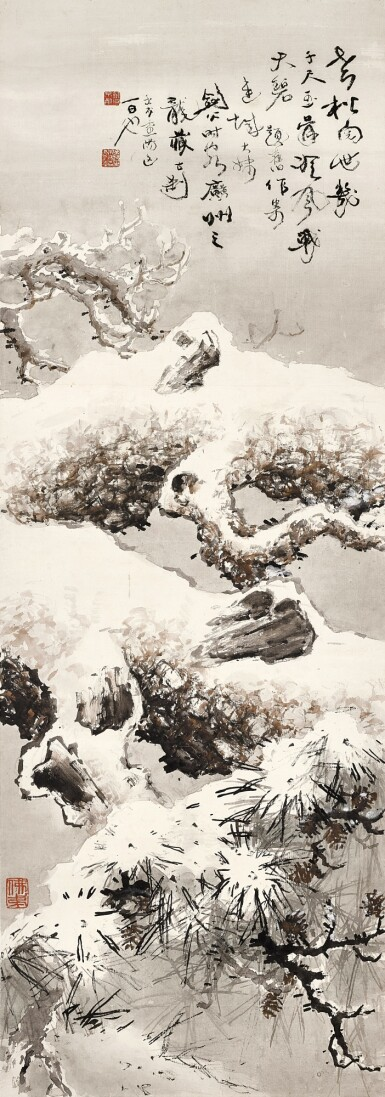
Gao Jianfu, Mighty Pine Covered with Snow (1922); influences from Japan shaped the Lingnan School founders' work for decades.

Chen and the Gao brothers travelled to Japan in the mid-to-late 1900s, among thousands of Chinese students who studied in the country after its victory in the First Sino-Japanese War. (Note: Other prominent Chinese students in Japan at the time included Lu Xun, Guo Moruo, and Yu Dafu, all of whom would promote a new form of literature after returning to China (Croizier 1988, p. 59).) For these students, Japan offered insight into Western ideals and approaches to modernization, having adapted these throughout the Meiji era, as well as freedom from traditional socio-cultural restrictions. Gao Jianfu arrived in the country in 1905 or 1906, settling in Tokyo; (Note: Sources differ as to his alma mater; Gao Jianfu has variously been reported as a student of the Tokyo Fine Arts School in Ueno Park and Okakura Kakuzō's Tokyo School of Fine Arts (Sullivan 1996, p. 53).) he brought Qifeng with him in 1907. Chen Shuren arrived separately in 1906, first studying at the Kyoto Prefecture School of Art (now part of the Kyoto City University of Arts) then enroling at Tokyo's Rikkyo University.

In Japan, the painters studied Western techniques. Their primary influences came from the syncretic Nihonga school of painting; Gao Jianfu is also reported to have joined more westernized Yōga organizations such as the White Horse Society. Croizier writes that the Shijō school and its syncretic influences, originating in Kyoto but promulgated throughout Japan by artists such as Takeuchi Seihō, was particularly influential. Shijō-trained painters taught at several schools, including those attended by Chen Shuren and Gao Jianfu. (Note: Individual artists identified as influences on the Lingnan School founders include Takeuchi Seihō, Yamamoto Shunkyo (Thoraval 1988, p. 21), Kanō Hōgai, Hashimoto Gahō (Sullivan 1996, p. 52), as well as Gao Qifeng's teacher Tanaka Raishō (Chu 1981, p. 7). Later Lingnan painters who studied in Japan drew from other influences; Kondo (2013, p. 20), for instance, sees a shared "emotional resonance" in works by Fang Rending and Shunsuke Matsumoto.) Influence from Japan Fine Arts Exhibitions has also been noted.

The founders' time in Japan was also spent with revolutionary activities with Sun Yat-sen's Tongmenghui. Introduced to the society through his friend Liao Zhongkai, Gao Jianfu joined the Tongmenghui shortly after his arrival, and he drew on nationalist imagery for paintings depicting the attempted suicide of Shi Kefa as well as the militant activities of Hua Mulan; Gao Qifeng also became a member. Chen, associated with the anti-Qing movement since his time in Hong Kong, joined the Tongmenghui soon after its establishment. By 1910, all three had dedicated themselves to the nationalist cause of modernizing China; this was later realized, in part, by challenging traditional art conventions.

=== 1911 Revolution and Shanghai ===
In late 1908, Gao Jianfu was dispatched to Guangdong by the Tongmenghui, where he worked with Huang Xing to plan attacks against Qing dynasty officials; the cell was responsible for the killing of General Fengshan in 1911, and for a time Gao Jianfu served as the region's governor. Gao Qifeng was also in Guangdong during this period, though he did not have such a prominent role in the political movement. Chen Shuren travelled to Wuhan to assist the republicans in the 1911 Revolution. In the early years of the Republic of China, the Gaos withdrew from formal politics in favour of focusing on art, though they remained proponents of republican ideals, and became active in Shanghai; this city, a major cultural centre, offered the opportunity to promulgate their ideas.

Around this time, the Gao brothers operated the Aesthetic Institute, a combined gallery, exhibition hall, and publishing house. The Gaos sponsored exhibitions of their art in Shanghai as well as in nearby Nanjing and Hangzhou; they were among the first in Shanghai to allow the public sale of artwork. They began to deem their style a "New National Painting", one that synthesized traditional Chinese painting with foreign art. This was spread through folios of reproduced works, which also included paintings by Chen Shuren; one, published in 1912, contained only the works of Gao Qifeng and promoted them as part of a "Modern New School" At the same time, to ensure a stable income the Gaos produced more easily marketable works that followed traditional tastes.

Through the Aesthetic Institute, the Gao brothers established The True Record in 1912, with Qifeng as editor-in-chief and Jianfu serving as editor alongside Huang Binhong. This magazine had four stated goals: to monitor the new republic, report the welfare of the people, promote socialism, and distribute world knowledge. (Note: Such a mission was reflective of Sun Yat-sen's Three Principles of the People (Floriani 2023, p. 225).) At the same time, the Gaos used the magazine to advance their "New National Painting". As a guest writer, Chen Shuren – still studying in Japan – serialized his translation of a book on painting methods derived from western traditions. Such suggestions were viewed as radical, and thus acceptance was limited. In early 1913, the magazine was closed after it implicated President Yuan Shikai in the killing of Song Jiaoren.

=== Return to Guangdong ===
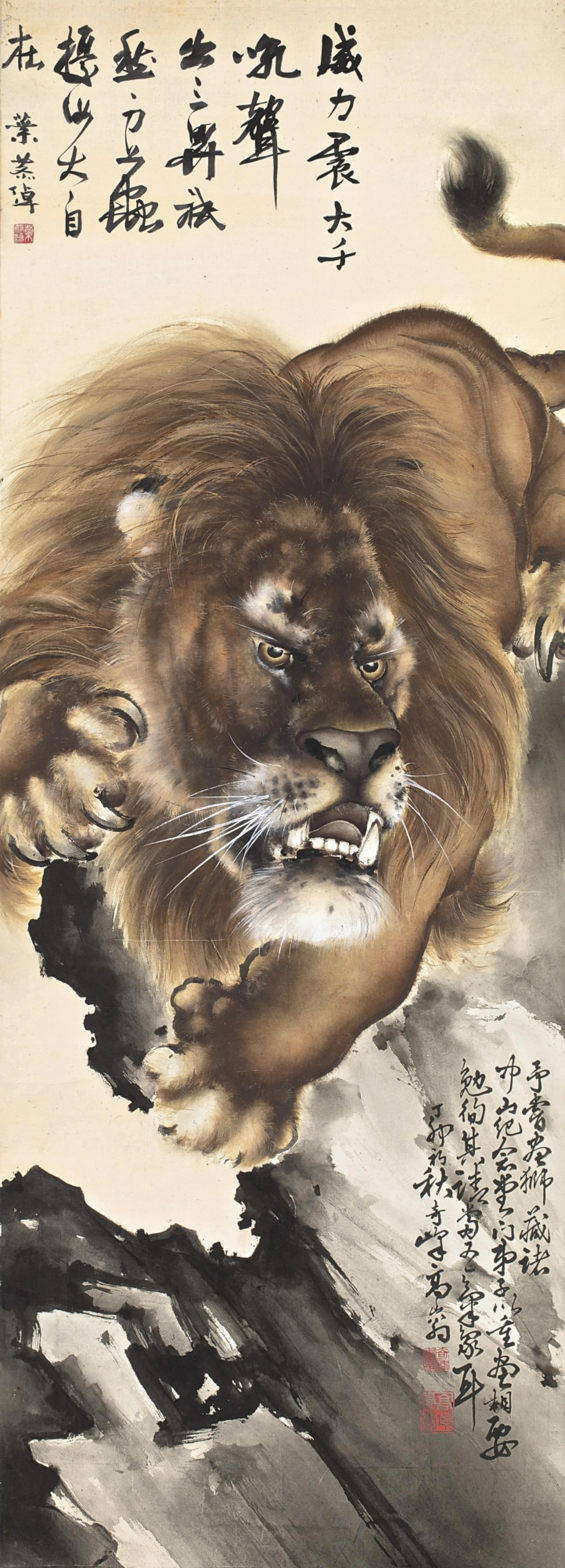
Gao Qifeng, Angry Lion (1927); Gao used animals as allegories for revolution.

The Gaos returned to Guangdong in the late 1910s, where they began to teach art. Gao Jianfu took a position in Guangdong Industrial Art Commission as well as leadership of the Provincial Industrial School. Meanwhile, Gao Qifeng initially took a job at the Art and Printmaking Department at the Class A Industrial School, also establishing the Aesthetics Museum on Fuxue West Street. In 1925, he was made an honorary professor at Lingnan University (now part of Sun Yat-sen University). Chen Shuren, having maintained close ties with the Chinese Republicans, left Japan in 1916 after graduating and travelled to Canada on government assignment. (Note: According to Croizier (2013, p. 25), Chen Shuren is not known to have painted during his time in Canada.) He only returned to China in 1922.

With the death of Sun Yat-sen in 1926, the three founders contributed works to the Sun Yat-sen Memorial Hall. Gao Jianfu provided a view of Leifeng Pagoda, while Chen Shuren presented a painting of blooming kapok flowers. Three paintings were contributed by Gao Qifeng: an eagle, a horse, and a lion. Such works had been praised by Sun, who considered them representative of the revolutionary spirit. By 1927, the school had established a solid position as a modernizing movement in Chinese art, which was supported by their allies in the ruling Kuomintang party. After organizing several public art exhibitions in the 1920s, Gao Jianfu was entrusted with preparing the First National Art Exhibition in Nanjing in 1929.

The Gao brothers established their own studios. Jianfu established the Spring Slumber Studio in 1923 or 1924. Having previously taken private students, including He Xiangning, the wife of his friend Liao Zhongkai, at the studio he took pupils such as Fang Rending, Li Xiongcai, and Situ Qi. Qifeng, meanwhile, established the Heavenly Breeze Pavilion on Ersha Island in the Pearl River after recuperating from an illness on the island in 1929. He took students including Zhang Kunyi, Huang Shaoqiang, and Chao Shao-an. Chen Shuren had no direct followers.

=== National prominence ===
Building on their established ties with the Kuomintang government, the Lingnan School enjoyed national prominence through the 1930s. Several of the masters and their disciples participated in international art exhibitions, which were organized by the government as part of its foreign policy. Works by Gao Jianfu, Chen Shuren, and Chao Shao-an received prizes at the 1931 Belgium International Exhibition, and paintings were exhibited through Europe in the 1930s. Further exhibitions by He Xiangning and Gao Jianfu were held in the Straits Settlement in 1929 and 1930, respectively. Gao Qifeng was scheduled to organize an exhibition in Berlin in 1933, but he died en route to a plenary session; and President Lin Sen later gave him the title "Sage of Painting".

Exhibitions of the artists' works were held throughout Republican China, with Gao Qifeng organizing an exhibition as early as 1921. Gao Jianfu held a solo exhibition in Nanjing in 1935, which was widely praised; the May 4th Movement leader Luo Jialun declared his art to be "the hot blood of the revolution, refined and made into beauty". Joint exhibitions were held in several cities for the movement's founders as well as their disciples. Chen Shuren, having spent much of the previous decade active in politics, resumed painting extensively, travelling to Guilin in 1931 in search of material and holding a solo exhibition in Shanghai in the mid-1930s.

With this national recognition, Gao Jianfu was teaching at Sun Yat-sen University by 1936; he took a visiting professorship at Nanjing's National Central University that year. He also undertook several trips to learn foreign art, including to Calcutta, Nepal, and the Ajanta Caves in 1930–1931, and in subsequent years he produced copies of several works he saw during this journey. Chen Shuren likewise travelled, visiting such popular vistas as the Great Wall of China, West Lake, and the Li River. He produced several landscapes during this period, marked by strong outlines.

=== Later years and subsequent generations ===
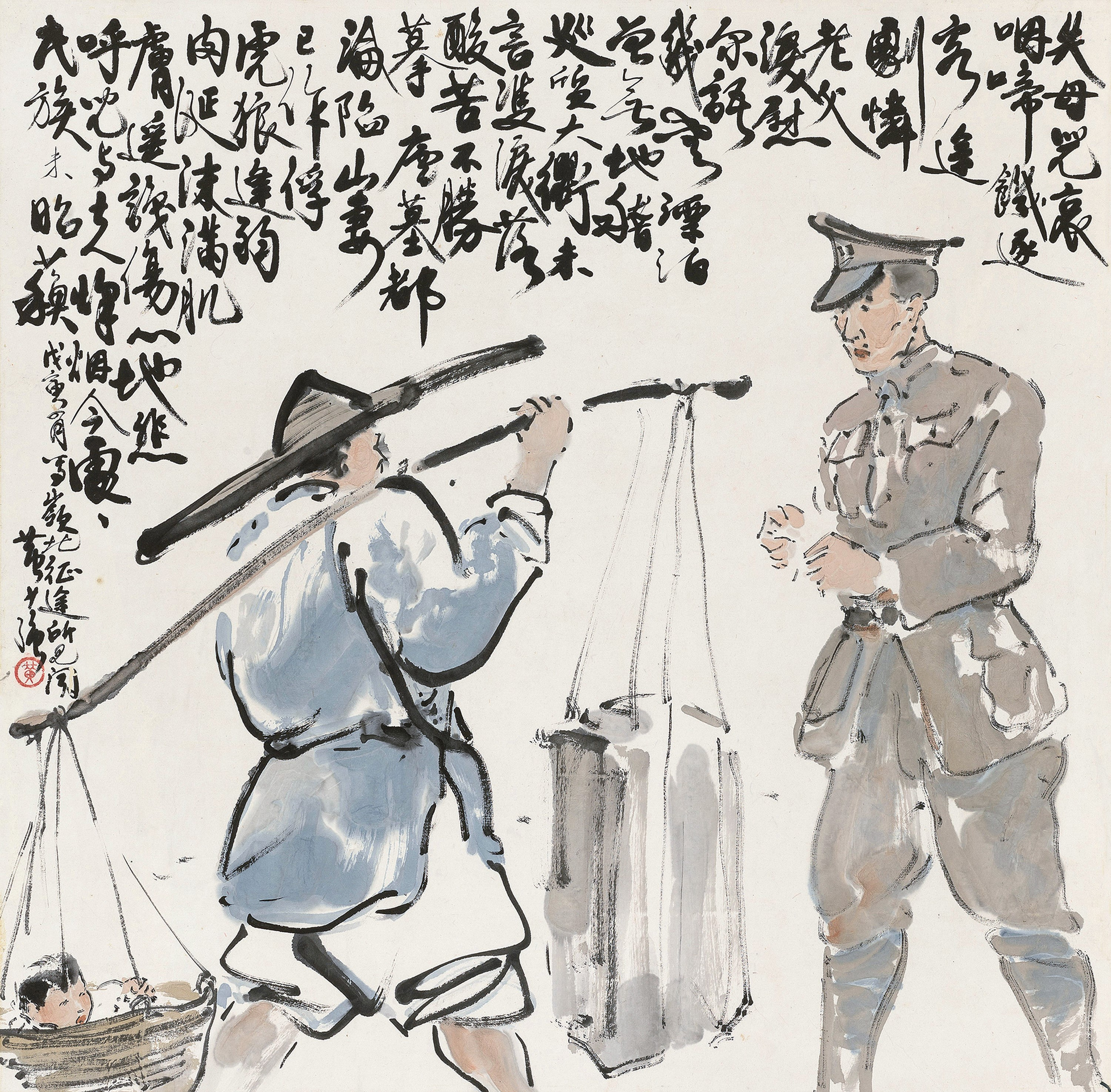
Huang Shaoqiang, Hunger (1938); in the late 1930s and early 1940s, members of the Lingnan School organized exhibitions that challenged the invading Imperial Japanese Army.

By the mid-1930s, second-generation Lingnan artists had gained sufficient recognition to hold their own exhibitions; others, such as Gao Jianfu's student Wu Peihui, were featured at international exhibitions. Most of these disciples only had local recognition. While Gao Qifeng's students remained in Guangdong, several of Gao Jianfu's students travelled to Japan to advance their knowledge, including Fang Rending, Li Xiongcai, and Yang Shanshen.

As China–Japan relations soured in the 1930s, the school faced criticism for its Japanese influences. With the outbreak of the Second Sino-Japanese War, the condemnation became more pointed. Efforts were made to recontextualize Japanese influences on the Lingnan school, with Gao Jianfu's student Jen Yu-wen arguing that "the Japanese have no art of their own. Whatever they have has been learned from the Chinese" and "art should transcend all national and racial boundaries." Such efforts were futile, though further exhibitions of works from the Lingnan School were held in Macau, where Gao Jianfu had fled during the Second Sino-Japanese War. The artist prepared several works criticizing the war, as did his pupils. After the war, Gao Jianfu returned to Guangdong, establishing the Jinshe Painting Society and the Nanzhong Academy of Fine Arts with his students.

The last exhibition of the Lingnan School during its founders' lifetimes was held in June 1948, featuring works by Chen Shuren, Gao Jianfu, Chao Shao-an, and Gao Jianfu's students Guan Shanyue and Yang Shanshen; several solo exhibitions occurred in later years. Having spent much of his last years as Kuomintang government official in Chongqing, Chen Shuren died in 1949. Gao Jianfu followed in 1951. The Lingnan School, already scattered following the Second Sino-Japanese War, dissipated after the Chinese Civil War. Several of Gao Jianfu's students remained in Guangdong, with Guan Shanyue working on communist art and Li Xiongcai taking a teaching role at the Guangzhou Academy of Fine Arts. Chao Shao-an continued to practice the Lingnan style in Hong Kong, teaching it to hundreds of students through his Today's Art Association. These included Au Ho-nien, who continued the school in Taiwan, and Huang Leisheng and Liu Yunheng, (Note: Also known as Stephen Lowe, Liu emigrated to Canada in the 1950s. He established a gallery in Victoria, British Columbia, predominantly producing landscapes and animal paintings for non-Chinese buyers (Croizier 2013, p. 27).) who moved to North America. Many third-generation Lingnan painters are amateurs, rather than professional artists; as of 2013, some remain active in British Columbia, Canada.

== Style ==
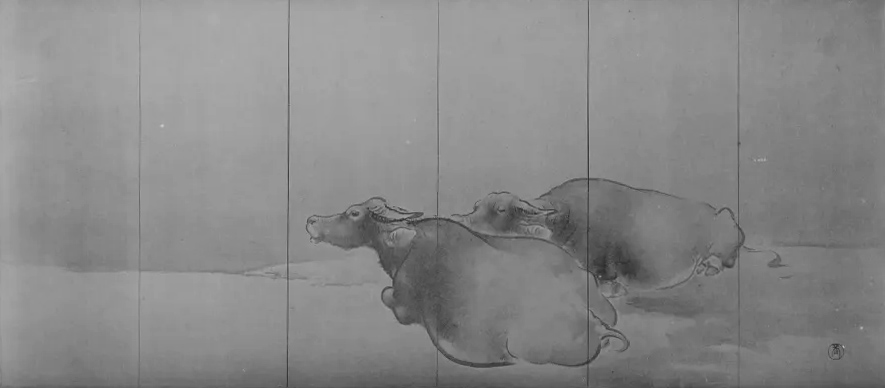
Hosho Hikida, Herdboy (1909)

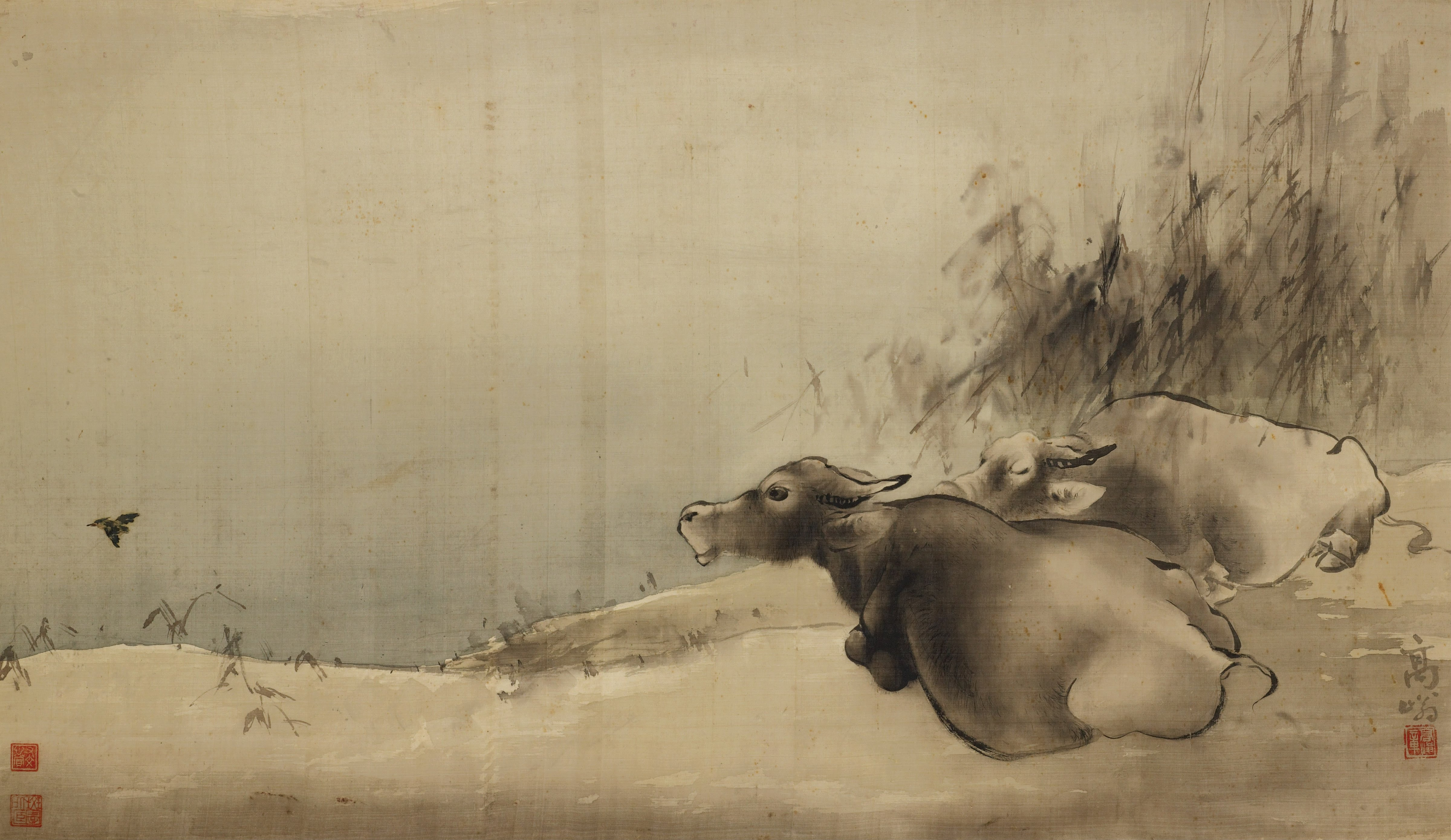
Gao Qifeng, Two Water Buffaloes (undated)

Works by the Lingnan School drew heavily from Japanese sources, with some being direct copies.

Early works of the Lingnan School, produced before its founders attended school in Japan, show strong influences from Ju Lian. Croizier writes that Gao Jianfu's works produced circa 1900 strongly favour those of his master, but stiffer and with less spontaneity. Chen Shuren developed refined brushing techniques that allowed a high level of delicacy. No works of Gao Qifeng from this period are known to have survived, but Croizier notes evidence of Ju Lian's influence even in his paintings from after his return from Japan. Ju's students adopted techniques that he advocated, including controlling the flow of water to give form to "boneless" works and using white powder to produce a glossy effect.

Later works drew heavily from the Western-inspired techniques the artists learned in Japan. They employed varying levels of realism and expressiveness, as well as Japanese lighting techniques, atmosphere creation, and snow depictions. Their use of perspective and colour was likewise drawn from Japanese influences. The Shijō school was the school's most prominent influence, though elements of the traditional Kanō school are also evident in some works. Several works have been noted as direct copies of Japanese works. (Note: The practice of copying has a lengthy history in Chinese art, being considered one of the six principles of Chinese painting. It was understood that, by imitating the works of their predecessors, artists would simultaneously preserve earlier artworks and draw from the experiences, pictorial vocabulary, and insight of acknowledged masters (Sullivan 1961, pp. 98–99). Gao Jianfu explicitly extended this principle to foreign works, arguing that the principle originally referred to the copying of Indian works that were transmitted to China together with the spread of Buddhism (Croizier 1988, p. 198).) Works produced after the artists' Japanese studies continued to show these influences, giving what Grove Art Online describes as "strongly romantic yet realistic visions of storms, struggle, and heroic exertion."

By the late 1910s, the stylistic conventions of the movement had been established. Nonetheless, the Lingnan masters continued to differ in their techniques, such that Chen Shuren remarked to Gao Jianfu, "You partake of the strange and marvelous; I of the orthodox; Mr. Qifeng maintains a middle position." In their brushwork, Chen Shuren tended to be more delicate and restrained, with an emphasis on lines after the 1930s, while Gao Jianfu employed a higher level of vigour and experimentation, at times incorporating sfumato techniques; Gao Qifeng fell between them. He also showed fewer influences from the Jus than the others. The Gaos were further distinguished by several factors. Jianfu emphasized lines and dry techniques, drawing more heavily from traditional influences, while, Qifeng favoured inkwashes and wet brushes.

Styles among subsequent generations of Lingnan Painters likewise varied. Gao Qifeng's style was emulated by his student Zhang Kunyi, such that Croizier describes her works as "at times ... virtually indistinguishable from his". Paintings by Huang Shaoqiang are marked by bold outlines, as well as Japanese-inspired colour usage. Portraits by Fang Rending, meanwhile, are marked by restrained outlines as well as what the critic Wu Zhao described as harmonious and innovative colour systems. Working through the 1950s, Chao Shao-an developed a style that placed less emphasis on realism, even as it continued the earlier tendency to use bright colours, and used stronger brushwork. Li Xiongcai and Guan Shanyue, both of whom remained active in mainland China, expanded the Lingnan School with aspects of socialist realism.

== Subjects ==
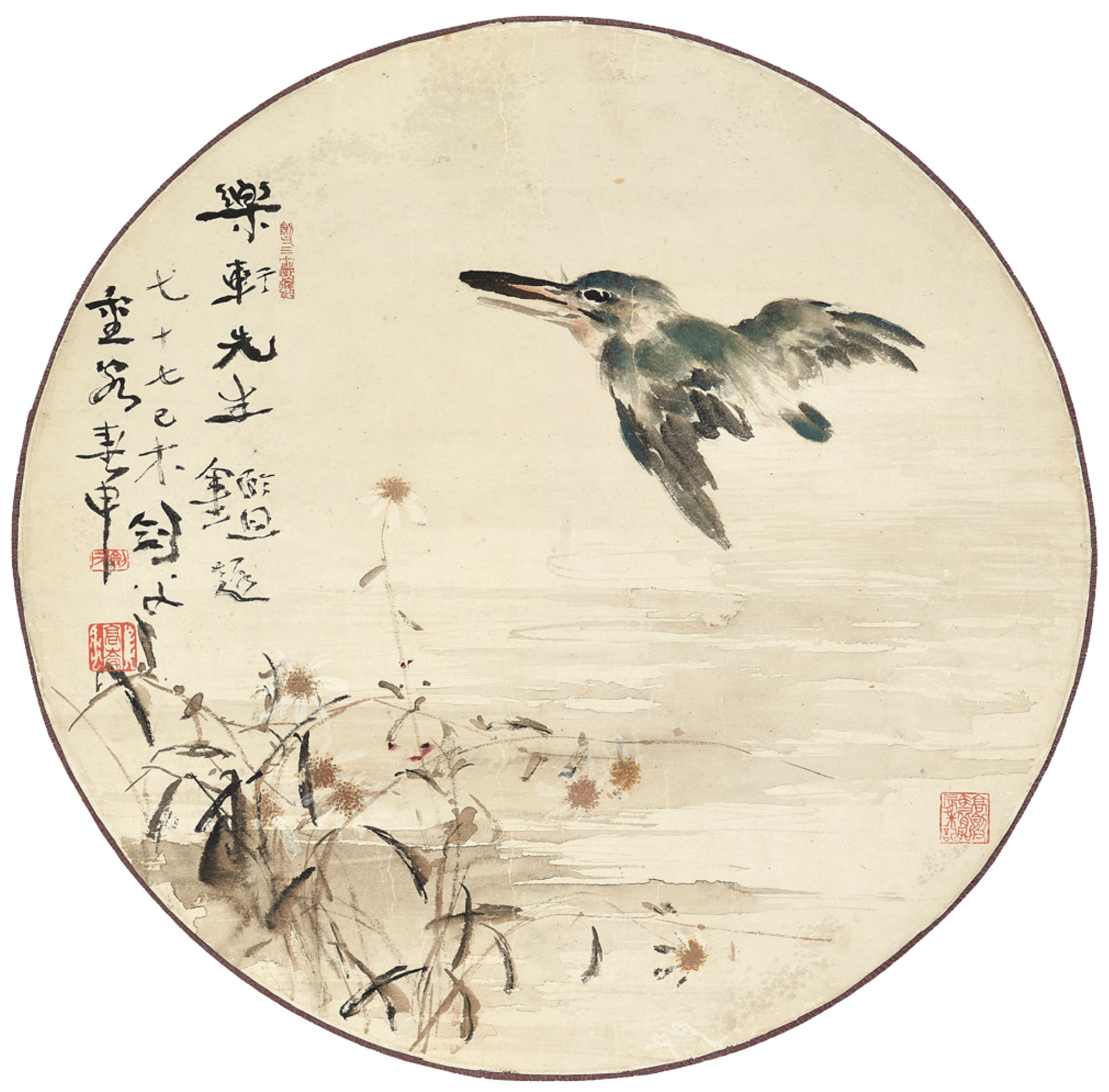
Gao Jianfu, Bird and Flower (1919); the three Lingnan Masters began as bird-and-flower painters.

Preferred subjects varied over time. The earliest works by members of the Lingnan School fall under the bird-and-flower genre, with some plants and insects also depicted. After the Gao brothers and Chen Shuren studied in Japan, they expanded their subject matter to include larger animals such as tigers, lions, and eagles, as well as landscapes. Flora varied, with works produced in Japan and immediately afterwards highlighting bamboo, while paintings completed in Guangdong used local plants such as banana leaves and kapok flowers; other subjects, such as chrysanthemums, pine trees, and lotus flowers, spanned both periods.

As they matured, the three Lingnan founders developed their own favoured subjects. Gao Jianfu became best known for landscapes, while Gao Qifeng gained a reputation as a painter of animals, and Chen Shuren continued to prioritize bird-and-flower scenes. Imagery of modern technology was rare, though works – particularly by Gao Jianfu – are attested. The movement's followers likewise developed their own favoured subjects. Li Xiongcai gained a reputation for landscapes, while Fang Rending was better known for his figures. Among Gao Qifeng's students, Chao Shao-an was recognized for versatility while Huang Shaoqiang predominantly painted figures. Second- and third-generation Lingnan painters have mostly focused on bird-and-flower paintings, blending watercolour with traditional Chinese brushtrokes; those living in Canada have generally focused on Chinese subject matter, though Situ Qi painted totem poles.

Political messages were incorporated into the paintings of the Lingnan School, with the founders using creatures such as lions to communicate ideals of revolution. Such messages were primarily allegorical, with direct political comments less prevalent. Later, during the Second Sino-Japanese War, Gao Jianfu produced several works that challenged the invading Imperial Japanese Army; a 1939 exhibition in Macau with his students was permeated by such themes. Similarly, Gao Qifeng's student Huang Shaoqiang organized art exhibitions to raise money for the fight against the Japanese while also creating works that depicted the suffering of the common people.

== Historical and market assessment ==
Initial response to the movement and its syncretic tendencies was tepid in Shanghai; the art historian Michael Sullivan writes that, further inland, it was decried as "cheap imported Japanese goods". Greater hostility was evident in Guangdong, where, in the early 1920s, exhibitions were received with hostility by reviewers and several works were defaced; criticism of the school continued among cultural conservatives after it gained national prominence. Later in the decade, the Lingnan School gained popularity, especially in northern China. Although some, such as the critic Chen Yifan, criticized the movement as insufficiently distancing itself from tradition, others highlighted its seemingly unfettered approach to art. The critic Wen Yuan-ning praised the school as breaking from "the same monotonous succession of birds on branches, tigers, eagles on rocks, lotus-flowers, pines, etc., drawn with very little variation from the manner of the ancients", while Sun Yat-sen described their work as harkening a "new era of aesthetics that represents the revolutionary spirit". (Note: Original: 「足以代表革命精神的新時代美感 」 (Liu & Hsu 2013, p. 31).) Likewise, in a 1935 article, the artist Fu Baoshi listed the Gao brothers and Chen Shuren as leaders in the revolutionizing of Chinese painting. (Note: Fu Baoshi also named two artists trained in the West: Xu Beihong and Liu Haisu (Croizier 1988, p. 114).)

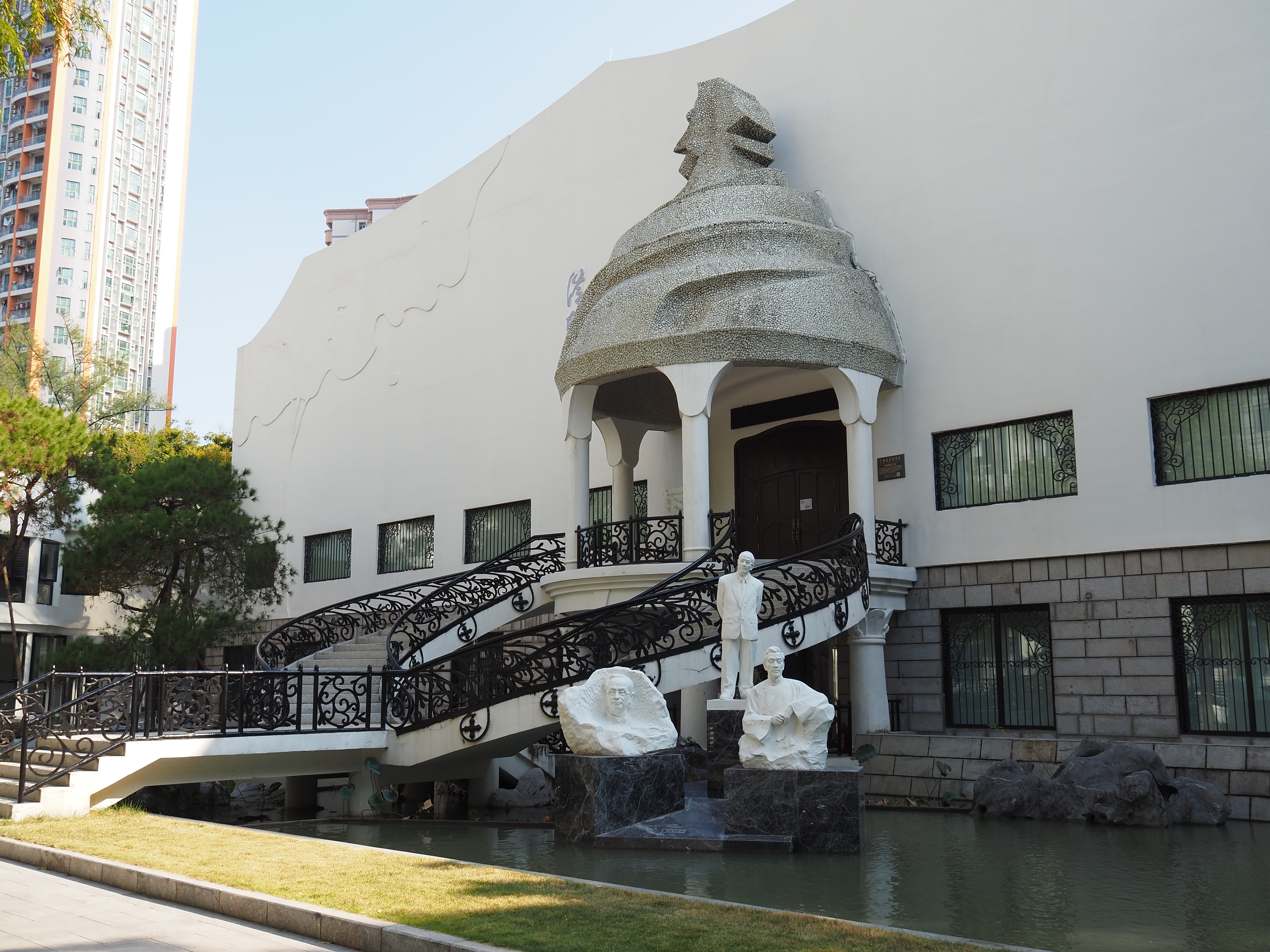
The Memorial Hall of the Lingnan School of Painting at the Guangzhou Academy of Fine Arts

As relations between China and Japan soured in the 1930s, the Lingnan School's Japanese influences drew criticism that was not curtailed by efforts to produce anti-Japanese art. Following the Chinese Civil War and the establishment of the People's Republic of China, the ties between the movement and the nationalist Kuomintang government resulted in censure; the stigma against the movement eased in the 1980s, though, by that point, dominant discourses in China had positioned it as a regional movement. At the same time, the Lingnan School has become seen as less subversive; Hong Kong-based artists influenced more heavily by Western approaches have viewed it as "old-fashioned and conservative", and later artists have deemed it "stereotyped to the point of stagnation". In a study of hybridity in Hong Kong, the scholar Frank Vigneron argued that the school had come to be seen more as more Chinese than Western. Nonetheless, the Lingnan School has been recognized, alongside the Beijing-Tianjin and Shanghai schools, as one of the major movements shaping 20th-century Chinese painting.

The Lingnan School has been commemorated through edifices and exhibitions. On 8 June 1991, the Memorial Hall of the Lingnan Painting School opened at the Guangzhou Academy of Fine Arts; it includes a museum area dedicated to the school. The Lingnan Fine Arts Museum at Academia Sinica was established in Taipei in 2002 to hold works of the school's artists. Exhibitions dedicated to the Lingnan School were held by the Guangzhou Art Museum in 2008 and the National Palace Museum in Taipei in 2013. Numerous exhibitions dedicated to specific Lingnan painters have also been held, both during their lifetimes and after their deaths. (Note: For example, a posthumous exhibition in Beijing was dedicated to the works of Chen Shuren in 1958, with further exhibitions in Hong Kong in 1980 and Taiwan in 1981 (Liu & Hsu 2013, p. 280). The Hong Kong Museum of Art held an exhibition dedicated to Gao Qifeng in 1981 (Urban Council 1981, p. 4). The Guangzhou Academy of Fine Arts held an exhibition featuring works by Chao Shao-an, Guan Shanyue, Li Xiongcai, and Yang Shanshen in 1987. Chao Shao-an held a solo exhibition in Germany in 1989, while Guan Shanyue held numerous solo exhibitions in China through the 1990s (Liu & Hsu 2013, p. 281). The Guangdong Museum of Art held a retrospective for Huang Shaoqiang in 1999, featuring more than a hundred of his works (Guangdong Museum of Art, Huang Shaoqiang).) A museum dedicated to the works of Li Xiongcai was established in Gaoyao, Zhaoqing, in 1993.

Compared to the Beijing-Tianjin and Shanghai schools, works of the Lingnan school have historically sold for little. Most auctions are in the Guangdong region. The works of Gao Qifeng tend to sell for more, with his Lion (1915) sold by China Guardian in 2010 for 6.72 million yuan (US$993,000). Gao Jianfu's works have sold for less, with his Double Cranes reaching a record of 1.32 million yuan (US$159,000) in 1996. Chen Shuren's works have generally received the least at auction; as of 2014, only three have sold for more than a million yuan. Several works by Guan Shanyue and Li Xiongcai have sold for more than ten million yuan, and Chao Shao-an's Ambition and Beasts reached 6.02 million Hong Kong dollars (US$776,000) at Christie's Hong Kong in 2012.

== Notable artists ==
- Au Ho-nien
- Chao Shao-an
- Chen Shuren
- Gao Jianfu
- Gao Qifeng
- Fang Rending
- Guan Shanyue
- He Qiyuan
- He Xiangning
- Huang Dufeng
- Huang Shaoqiang
- Li Xiongcai
- Pang Chai-sip
- Situ Qi
- Yang Shanshen
- Zhang Kunyi

== Works cited ==
- Andrews, Julia F.; Shen, Kuiyi (2012). The Art of Modern China. Berkeley: University of California Press. ISBN 978-0-520-23814-5.
- Au, Ho-nien. 畫家介紹─高奇峰先生簡介 [Introduction to the Painters: Gao Qifeng] (in Chinese). Lingnan Fine Arts Museum. Archived from the original on 15 July 2024.
- Cai Dengshan (蔡登山) (25 August 2023). 番禺高奇峰：未尽其才的"岭南三杰 [Panyu Gao Qifeng: The "Three Heroes of Lingnan" Who Did Not Use His Talents to Their Fullest]. Dute News (in Chinese). Shenzhen Media Group. Archived from the original on 17 September 2024.
- Cai, Heng (2015). "Tradition Unfettered: The Story of Singapore Ink". In Low, Sze Wee (ed.). Siapa Nama Kamu? Art in Singapore Since the 19th Century. National Gallery Singapore. pp. 68–89. doi:10.2307/j.ctvgc600q.8. ISBN 978-981-09-7352-0. JSTOR j.ctvgc600q.8.
- Chu, Christina (1981). "The Art of Gao Qifeng: An Investigation of Historical Background and Stylistic Development". The Art of Gao Qifeng. Hong Kong: Urban Council. pp. 6–12. ISBN 978-962-215-040-9.
- Chu, Christina (1998). "The Lingnan School and Its Followers: Radical Innovation in Southern China". In Andrews, Julia Frances; Shen, Kuiyi (eds.). A Century in Crisis: Modernity and Tradition in the Art of Twentieth-century China. New York: Guggenheim Museum. pp. 40–79. ISBN 978-0-8109-6909-4.
- 当代国画家——黎雄才 [Contemporary Chinese Painter – Li Xiongcai] (in Chinese). Guangdong Provincial People's Government Local Chronicles Office. 18 August 2023. Archived from the original on 12 March 2025.
- Croizier, Ralph (1988). Art and Revolution in Modern China: The Lingnan (Cantonese) School of Painting, 1906–1951. Berkeley: University of California Press. ISBN 978-0-520-33696-4.
- Croizier, Ralph (2013). "Distant Ripples on a Far Shore: The Later Lingnan Pai in Canada". In Chen Ruilin (陈瑞林) and Wei Chenghong (韦承红) (eds.). 岭南画派在上海: 国际学术研讨会论文集/ 岭南画派纪念 [Lingnan School of Painting in Shanghai: International Scholarship Seminar Thesis Anthology]. Guangzhou: Lingnan Fine Arts Publishing House. pp. 24–33. ISBN 978-7-5362-5284-4.
- Croizier, Ralph; Liang, Tian S. (2022). Liang, Tian S. (ed.). "Lingnan School". Grove Art Online. doi:10.1093/gao/9781884446054.article.T051207.
- Floriani, Giulia Pra (2023). "Photographic Portraits of Leaders of the 1911 Revolution: The Promise of Historical Rupture in the Chinese Republican Press". In Satterthwaite, Tim; Thacker, Andrew (eds.). Magazines and Modern Identities: Global Cultures of the Illustrated Press, 1880–1945. London: Bloomsbury. pp. 223–237. ISBN 978-1-350-27865-3.
- "Foreword". The Art of Gao Qifeng. Hong Kong: Urban Council. 1981. p. 4. ISBN 978-962-215-040-9.
- Gu, Yi (2013). "What's in a Name? Photography and the Reinvention of Visual Truth in China, 1840–1911". The Art Bulletin. 95: 120–138. doi:10.1080/00043079.2013.10786109.
- "黄少强·走向民间专题展" [Huang Shaoqiang: Towards the People Special Exhibition] (in Chinese). Guangdong Museum of Art. 6 March 2008. Archived from the original on 6 September 2024.
- "黄少强(1901–1942) 谱家国哀愁 写民间疾苦" [Huang Shaoqiang (1901–1942) Wrote About the Sorrow of the Country and the Suffering of the People]. Southern Metropolis Daily (in Chinese). 23 March 2009. Archived from the original on 5 January 2024. (via Guangzhou Library)
- 岭南画派简介 [Introduction to the Lingnan School of Painting] (in Chinese). Department of Culture, Guangdong Provincial Government. 27 September 2007. Archived from the original on 11 March 2008.
- Kondo, Hidemi (2013). 岭南派的来源 [Origin of the Lingnan School]. In Chen Ruilin (陈瑞林) and Wei Chenghong (韦承红) (eds.). 岭南画派在上海: 国际学术研讨会论文集/ 岭南画派纪念 [Lingnan School of Painting in Shanghai: International Scholarship Seminar Thesis Anthology] (in Chinese). Guangzhou: Lingnan Fine Arts Publishing House. pp. 18–23. ISBN 978-7-5362-5284-4.
- Li, Chu-Tsing (1979). "Trends in Modern Chinese Painting: (The C.A. Drenowatz Collection)". Artibus Asiae: Supplementum. 36: III–248. doi:10.2307/1522692. JSTOR 1522692.
- Liang, Tian S. (2022). "Gao Qifeng". Grove Art Online. doi:10.1093/oao/9781884446054.013.90000138521.
- Liu, Fang-Ju (劉芳如); Hsu, Wen-Mei (許文美), eds. (2013). 溯源與拓展：嶺南畫派特展/劉芳如，許文美主編 [Origins and Developments of the Lingnan School of Painting] (in Chinese). Taipei: National Palace Museum. ISBN 978-957-562-676-1.
- Lu Youzhe (吕友者) (6 May 2014). 岭南画派的艺术及市场 [The Art Market of the Lingnan School]. Oriental Collection (in Chinese). Archived from the original on 1 October 2024 – via Sina.com.
- "Memorial Hall of Lingnan Painting School Lauded Nationally". Haizhu County Municipal Government. 21 February 2023. Archived from the original on 21 January 2025.
- Nash, Deborah; Liang, Tian S. (2022). Liang, Tian S. (ed.). "Lingnan School". Grove Art Online. doi:10.1093/gao/9781884446054.article.T03063 (inactive 1 July 2025).
- Pan Yaochang (潘耀昌) and Xu Li (徐立) (2011). 上海早期都市文艺先锋 —《真相画报》 [Shanghai's Early Urban Art Pioneer – "The True Record"] (PDF). Journal of Shanghai University (in Chinese): 131–140. Archived from the original (PDF) on 19 September 2024.
- Sullivan, Michael (1961). An Introduction to Chinese Art. Berkeley: University of California Press. OCLC 1069809.
- Sullivan, Michael (1996). Art and Artists of Twentieth-Century China. Berkeley: University of California Press. ISBN 978-0-520-07556-6.
- Thoraval, Joël (1988). "Le Destin Ambigu des Peintres du Guangdong" [The Ambiguous Destiny of the Painters of Guangdong]. Bulletin de Sinologie (in French) (49): 21–23. JSTOR 24115323.
- Vigneron, Frank (2013). "Hybridization in the Visual Arts: Now You See Me, Now You Don't". In Chan, Kwok-bun (ed.). Hybrid Hong Kong. London and New York: Routledge. pp. 121–136. ISBN 978-1-135-75500-3.
- Ye Shuming (叶曙明) (16 August 2021). 为平民而画的岭南画家黄少强 [Huang Shaoqiang: A Lingnan Painter for the Common People]. Yangcheng.com (in Chinese). Archived from the original on 20 May 2022.
- Yi Dian (伊甸) (4 December 2014). 香港举办彭济涉作品纪念展 [Hong Kong Hosts a Memorial Exhibition of Pang Chai-sip's Works]. Shenzhen News. Archived from the original on 4 March 2016.
- Zhong Lin (钟琳) (14 January 2015). "黄少强 一枝秃管衡身世描写人间疾苦声" [Huang Shaoqiang's Life: The Story of a Bald Pipe Describes the Suffering of the World]. Southcn.com (in Chinese). China South Publishing & MediaGroup. Archived from the original on 6 September 2024.
- Zhu Wanzhang (朱万章) (31 July 2017). 高奇峰《松猿图》：画海横舟 劈波至勇 [Gao Qifeng's "Pine and Monkey": Painting a Boat Crossing the Sea and Bravely Cutting through the Waves]. rmzxb.com.cn (in Chinese). Chinese People's Political Consultative Conference. Archived from the original on 16 March 2021.
- Zhu Xiaoqing (朱晓青) (2013). 海外岭南画派研究与艺术史研究的“全球化”推向 [The "Globalization" of Lingnan School of Painting: Overseas Art History Research]. In Chen Ruilin (陈瑞林) and Wei Chenghong (韦承红) (eds.). 岭南画派在上海: 国际学术研讨会论文集/ 岭南画派纪念 [Lingnan School of Painting in Shanghai: International Scholarship Seminar Thesis Anthology] (in Chinese). Guangzhou: Lingnan Fine Arts Publishing House. pp. 73–84. ISBN 978-7-5362-5284-4.
