= Fang Rending =

Chinese painter (1901–1975)

- 方人定
- Born: Fang Shiqin (方士钦; 方士欽); 1901; Zhongshan, Guangdong, Qing dynasty
- Died: 1975 (aged 73–74)
- Movement: Lingnan School

Chinese name
- Chinese: 方人定
Transcriptions
Standard Mandarin
- Hanyu Pinyin: Fāng Réndìng
- Wade–Giles: Fang^{1} Jen^{2}-ting^{4}
- IPA: [fáŋ ɻə̌n.tîŋ]
Yue: Cantonese
- Yale Romanization: Fong^{1} Jan^{4}ding^{6}
- IPA: [fɔŋ˥ jɐn˩.tɪŋ˨]

Fang Rending (Chinese: 方人定; pinyin: Fāng Réndìng, 1901–1975) was a Chinese artist with the Lingnan School known for his figure paintings. Born in Zhongshan, Guangdong, he initially enrolled at law school before taking up art. Initially studying under Gao Jianfu, in 1929 he travelled to Japan to study at the Nippon Art School. He participated in numerous joint exhibitions in the Republic of China and abroad, as well as several solo exhibitions. Fang broke with Gao Jianfu in 1941, and in subsequent years he experimented with new subject matter and, later, social realism. Compared to Gao's other students, Fang has received little scholarly attention, and auction prices for his works have generally been low.

== Biography ==
=== Early life and studies ===
Fang was born Fang Shiqin (方士钦; 方士欽) in Zhongshan, Guangdong, in 1901. He lived in Guangzhou by 1921, at which time he enrolled at law school; he remained a student of laws and jurisprudence through 1926. He did not begin painting until his early twenties.

Fang became a student of Gao Jianfu in 1923, where he learned the styles of the Lingnan School. He was one of numerous students at Gao's Spring Slumber studio, with his peers including Guan Shanyue, Li Xiongcai, and Yang Shanshen. His early works depicted various subjects, including figures, animals, and landscapes. In 1927, he engaged in an extensive written discourse with Huang Banruo of the National Painting Research Society over the status of the Lingnan School and its "new painting" within the constellation of Chinese art, as well as the practice of copying among the school's masters. Countering arguments of plagiarism, Fang argued that Huang and his associates were merely clinging to established approaches. After six months of ongoing discourse, the art patron Ye Gongchuo mediated a compromise.

Fang studied in Japan between 1929 and 1935, enrolling at the Nippon Art School. There, he studied new techniques for depicting figures, eschewing the strong defining outlines of traditional Chinese painting in favour of a more restrained approach. He developed his ability to employ Western approaches to lighting and shadows, honing his ability to blend diverse traditions. Works by Fang were included in the First National Exhibition of 1929 as well as the 1930 Liege Exposition in Belgium; others were exhibited in France, Japan, the Soviet Union, and the United Kingdom.

=== Return to China ===
After his return to China in 1935, Fang – together with three other painters, including his wife Yang Yinfang and two of Gao Jianfu's students, – organized a joint exhibition. It included more than a hundred of Fang's works, mostly works produced while he was in Japan. A solo exhibition was held in Nanjing two months later. Fang held another solo exhibition at Shanghai's Sun Company Building in 1937, it included more than a hundred paintings, including several depictions of historical figures such as the poet Qu Yuan and the assassin Jing Ke. Through these, Fang alluded to the need to combat the invading Imperial Japanese Army during the emerging Second Sino-Japanese War.

Fang regularly travelled between Guangdong and Hong Kong for work, variously serving as a professor at the Guangzhou Municipal Art College and Central South Art College. In 1938, he held a three-day exhibition at the St. Francis Hotel in Hong Kong. This exhibition emphasized wartime topics such as soldiers and refugees, with a preponderance of greys, tans, and greens. He subsequently travelled to the United States, taking some 100 works with him. Through the end of the decade, Fang participated in the Golden Gate International Exposition of 1939 in San Francisco and held shows in California and New York.

In 1941, Fang organized several of Gao Jianfu's pupils to establish the Re-Creation Society. The organization was intended to reject what the artists perceived as the patriarchal approach employed by Gao, who was accused of putting his own interests ahead of his students. A special publication issued by the organization for its inaugural exhibition in Hong Kong included an autobiography of Fang that claimed he had had no master. Such a challenge shocked the art community, with one article likening Fang to a "caged chicken rebelling". Fang also rejected Gao's teachings in a 1949 article in the Kaiming Bao newspaper, ridiculing them as doing little more than repeating old tricks.

=== Later years and death ===
Fang spent the last years of the war in Zhongshan, with several of his works included by the Republic of China government in a 1947 overview of the art world. In February 1948, he moved to Guangzhou, where he held a four-day exhibition. He remained in the People's Republic of China after its establishment. Over time, he incorporated elements of social realism into his artwork, and his 1948 exhibition focused predominantly on the experiences of the poor. A 1952 painting, left incomplete, depicted the early communist leader Peng Pai speaking with farmers. Also in the 1950s, he produced Ballad of the Pipa, a series of narrative panel paintings that drew from a poem by Bai Juyi.

While continuing to produce works that depicted the human form, with exhibitions in Guangzhou, Beijing, and Shenyang in 1956, Fang also taught the arts. He was a professor at the South China People's Academy of Literature and Art, managed the Guangzhou Chinese Painting Symposium, and served as vice-president of the Guangdong Academy of Painting. In the 1960s, much of his output depicted either beautiful women or traditional literati. He died in 1975, with many of his works having been destroyed during the Cultural Revolution.

== Analysis ==
The contemporary art critic Wu Zhao lauded Fang's painting as distinctive and "fully expressive of the present time", blending elegant lines and compositions with innovative colours and harmonies. Reviewing Fang's 1935 solo exhibition, the journalist Gu Tianxi praised Fang's emphasis on the figure and his ability to present "the inspired beauty of modern times". More conservative critics, meanwhile, decried the preponderance of Japanese influences in his work.

Fang attempted to paint contemporary subjects that reflected the spirit of the times. He wrote in 1935 that contemporary Chinese painting was weighed down by a bias that "condemns works depicting customs and lives of modern times as 'vulgar'", and that further developing Chinese art would require challenging this bias. Such subjects were generally presented with what the art scholar Ka Ming Kevin Lam describes as "a peculiar air of calmness and detachment", without any indication of hardship or emotion. Fang argued that, as figures had become less common in Chinese art, painting had lost its representativeness. In a 1941 article, Fang wrote:

From the Yuan dynasty up until now, landscape has replaced figure painting in the mainstream. Although painters have succeeded in creating a pure painting in landscape and flower-and-bird, that made art further removed from life and its content even more hollow. I strongly feel that we are now at a time when the nation is struggling for independence, survival, and revival, and the art we need should not be reclusive but more about human life.

Fang was one of two second-generation painters from the Lingnan School to focus on figures, the other being Huang Shaoqiang. Other members of the school, including Gao Jianfu and Guan Shanyue, had done work with figures but specialized in other areas. The art historian Ralph Croizier writes that, of Gao Jianfu's disciples who studied in Japan, Fang was the most noteworthy due to his productivity and his "boldness of experimentation", though he was ultimately "more innovative than influential"; generally, Guan Shanyue, Li Xiongcai, and Yang Shanshen are given more prominence in scholarship. A book-length biography of Fang, titled A Noble Character: A Short Biography of Fang Rending, was published by Chen Jichun in 2015. Several of Fang's paintings are held by the Guangdong Museum of Art. At auction, his works have generally performed poorly. His most expensive painting as of 2021 has been Lychee Picture (1953), sold at Beijing Yirong in 2011 for ¥2.875 million (USD 441,000).

== Works cited ==
- 【广东美术百年21大家】方人定 [[21 Guangdong Artists in the Past 100 Years] Fang Rending] (in Chinese). Guangdong Museum of Art. Archived from the original on 17 January 2025.
- Croizier, Ralph (1988). Art and Revolution in Modern China: The Lingnan (Cantonese) School of Painting, 1906–1951. Berkeley: University of California Press. ISBN 978-0-520-33696-4.
- Lam, Ka Ming Kevin (2018). Figural Modernism: Figure Painting of the Lingnan School and the Modernization of Chinese Art, 1911–1949 (Thesis). Northwestern University. doi:10.21985/n2-yvcg-4083.
- Sullivan, Michael (1996). Art and Artists of Twentieth-century China. Berkeley: University of California Press. ISBN 978-0-520-07556-6.
- Zhu Haoyun (朱浩云) (20 December 2021). 岭南画派方人定的艺术及市场走向 [The Art and Market Trends of Fang Rending of the Lingnan School]. The Paper (in Chinese). Archived from the original on 17 June 2024.
