= Au Ho-nien =

Chinese painter (1935–2024)

- Traditional Chinese: 歐豪年
- Simplified Chinese: 欧豪年
Transcriptions
Standard Mandarin
- Hanyu Pinyin: Ōu Hàonián
Yue: Cantonese
- Yale Romanization: Āu Hòuhnìhn

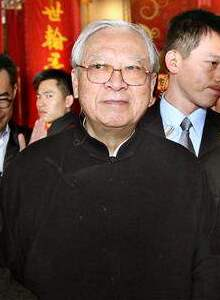
Au Ho-nien 2014

"Free and Unfettered" – an exhibition of his work at the Hong Kong Heritage Museum in 2012

Au Ho-nien (Chinese: 歐豪年; 1935 – 25 April 2024) was a Chinese painter. He studied under Chao Shao-an and his ink wash paintings, representative of the Lingnan School, were influential in Taiwan. His subject matter included landscapes, animals, feathers, and other elements, and his art used rich, varied forms alongside strong and vivid colors. In 2019, a solo exhibition of his work was displayed at the Asian Art Museum in San Francisco.

== Early life ==
Au Ho-nien was born in Maoming, Guangdong, in 1935. He studied under Chao Shao-an from 1952, at age 17, and belonged to the Lingnan School. In 1950, his family moved to Hong Kong.

== Art and teaching career ==
In 1968, Au held his first solo exhibition at the National Museum of History in Taiwan. In the same year, President Chiang Kai-shek and his wife Soong Mei-ling selected eight of Au's pieces for the collection in the Zhongshan Building in Taipei, where they have remained on display for decades. In 1970, when he was 35 years old, Au went to Taiwan to teach at the Chinese Culture University, settling on the island and creating close ties between the Lingnan School of painting and the development history of art education in Taiwan. Beginning several years after settling in Taiwan, Au helped spread Chinese culture worldwide through his participation in international exhibitions. As Taiwan's political situation on the international stage became difficult, Au participated in international art exhibitions as a means of cultural diplomacy, and was a representative of Taiwanese artists during Taiwan's economic boom.

In 1983, Au served as a jury member for the National Literature and Art Awards. In 1993, he was bestowed with a Special Award of the Grand Palais in Paris, France, becoming the first Chinese painter to win this honor. In 1994, he was awarded an honorary doctorate by Wonkwang University in South Korea. In 1995, he was hired as a director of the Chu Hai College of Higher Education in Hong Kong. In 1999, he won the second Global Outstanding Persons Gold Dragon Award. In June 2016, he was awarded an honorary Doctor of Letters degree from National Dong Hwa University, and in November of the same year, he was also awarded an honorary doctor of letters degree from the Chinese University of Hong Kong.

In 2000, he established the Au Ho-nien Cultural Foundation, organizing large-scale exhibitions and academic seminars on the Lingnan School.

In 2002, the Au Ho-nien Cultural Foundation donated more than 100 paintings to Academia Sinica to establish the Lingnan Fine Arts Museum. In 2004, the University of Indianapolis established the Au Ho-nien Museum, and in 2005, the Au Ho-nien Art Center (now the Au Ho-nien Art Museum) was established on Chinese Culture University's Yangmingshan Campus in Taipei.

== Later years ==
In his later years, he devoted himself to poetry, publishing "A Poem of Yicui Mountain Hall" in 2006. Qin Xiaoyi praised him as a "great master" and all-rounder of poetry, calligraphy, and painting unique in the history of the Lingnan School.

Au's work is characterized by the Lingnan School's use of colors, white space, and skeletal structure, along with a combination of modern and Western elements. In his later years, he integrated poetry and calligraphy into his paintings, earning him a reputation as an artist embodying the humanistic spirit of Eastern cultural tradition. Painter Chu Ko described Au's paintings as having "achieved the realm of one whose 'mastery has penetrated downward', which is why he enjoys a great reputation".

Au died on 25 April 2024, at the age of 89.
