= Huang Banruo =

Chinese painter

Huang Banruo (Chinese: 黄般若; Wade–Giles: Huang Pan-jo; 1901–1968}, also romanized as Huang Bore and Wong Po-Yeh, was a Chinese painter, known for his traditional style landscapes.

Huang was born in Guangzhou. His uncle was the painter Huang Shaomei, who he studied under. In 1923, he founded the Guihai Painting Research Society.

From 1924 until 1940, he was active in both Guangzhou and Hong Kong. In 1926, he helped found the Guangdong Association for the Study of Chinese Paintings's Hong Kong branch with Pan Dawei and Deng Erya. At the same time, he became an art teacher in a middle school.

In 1956, he was a founding member of the Bingshen Art Club alongside artists like Chao Shao-an, Yang Shanshen, and Li Yanshan. He was friends with Chang Dai-chien and Huang Binhong, which helped connect Hong Kong painters with the prominent Chinese artists of the time.

He finally settled in Hong Kong in 1968, and died later that year at the height of his artistic career.

== Selected paintings ==
- Village by the Sea (1966-67)
