= Huang Dufeng =

Chinese painter and educator

Huang Du-feng (Chinese: 黄独峰; 1913–1998), a Chinese painter and educator, was one of the most important Chinese artists of the twentieth century in Guangxi Province, China. He was chair of the Guangxi branch of the Chinese Artists Association and vice-chancellor of the Guangxi Institute of Fine Arts. His distinctive style was a confluence of the Shanghai tradition, Ling-nan style and Neoclassical styles.

== Early life ==
Du-feng was born in 1913 in Jieyang, Guangdong Province. He was fervently interested in art since childhood.

== Education ==
At age six or seven, he learnt to draw by tracing out classical portraits of Guanyin and Buddha. When he was 12 years of age, a Chinese scholar Chen Jie-long taught him classical Chinese literature. At the age of 16, he began to do flower and bird painting. His teacher Kuang Bi-bo was a student of Ren Bo-nian, who became a member of the Shanghai School after 1855. Therefore, the painting style of the Shanghai School can be considered the first artistic influence that Du-feng followed. In 1931 (at age 18), Du-feng entered the Spring Awakening Art Academy (Chunshui Huayuan), a Ling-nan style art academy run by Prof. Gao Jian-fu. There, Du-feng was trained under the personal instruction of Gao, who with his younger brother Qi-feng and Chen Shu-ren, was a student of the famous artist Ju Lian, who excelled at painting birds and flowers. Early in his own career, Gao went to Japan to further his studies and was influenced by the merging of the Westernderived realism and Japanese Nihonga style painting. He adopted the most interesting aspects of this style as he was maturing as an artist. As a result, he painted in a new style commonly known as eclecticism, or, regionally speaking, the style of the Ling-nan School, which through its characteristic of discarding the old and founding the new was widely considered at the time as the most advanced school of art. In 1936 (at age 23), Du-feng made his first overseas voyage to Japan. He studied Japanese painting in the Kawabata Studio in Tokyo with the aim of exposing himself to something new. At the age of 24, Du-feng returned to the mainland and began his frequent national painting trips, manifesting his great ambition and youthful spirit. Seventy-five years ago, as an outstanding second-generation artist of the Ling-nan school, Du-feng had already enjoyed a great reputation with personages such as Prof. Guan shan-yue, Prof. Li Xiong-cai, Zhao Shao-ang, and Yang Shan-shen. Young artists looked up to him as a model to emulate. In 1950 (at age 37), Du-feng decided that it was a great mistake to rely solely on sketching to form his ideas for painting and neglect absorbing traditional experience from other sources. Du-feng became a disciple of Prof. Zhang Da-qian at Windy Hall to obtain the kind of artistic nourishment he felt he was lacking. This move greatly surprised his friends and teachers because it is very unusual for an artist in China who has followed the teachings of a particular school and distinguished themselves in that circle to move to the opposite extreme. Thus, Du-feng was risking his already established fame and causing himself some trouble by starting over again. However, Du-feng had the courage to make this move. Prof. Zhang was well known for his abundant collections, as well as for his rich knowledge in traditional arts and his Neoclassical style of painting. During Du-feng's discipleship, he began to study the works of great masters such as Shi Tao, Shi Xi, Gong Xian, Ba-da Shan-ren, Chen Hong-shou, Dong Qi-chang and Xu Wei. He further studied the painting of the Song and Yuan dynasties and the Dunhuang frescoes. The Ling-nan School did not attach a great deal of importance on outline drawing, which meant that Du-feng had to work doubly hard to master this technique. In a state of absolute tranquillity, he contemplated and copied wholeheartedly until he could execute dots, lines and ink wash in the manner of the great masters. At this time, Du-feng suddenly found himself being immersed in the spiritual pool of tradition, and felt enriched and inspired, just as any typical disciple of Windy Hall.

== Time in Southeast Asia ==
However, Du-feng was not yet at his prime. The culmination of his work was not achieved until he travelled to Southeast Asia in 1952. It was there that he was able to assimilate his learnings from both his teachers, enabling his work to come full fruition. Both his teachers had been great inspirations to his work. Under the dual guidance of ‘take tradition as teacher’ and ‘take nature as teacher’, Du-feng was able to paint what he saw in his mind's eye freely and spontaneously. In Southeast Asia, Du-feng became one of the most welcome of all the visiting artists. Over the years, he had formed a personal style. Lee Man-feng, a famous Chinese painter in Southeast Asia and the founder of the Indonesian Chinese Arts Association stated that ‘Du-feng was once a follower of the stream of Ling-nan, but you can never tell for sure that his works are of Ling-nan style when you look at them, and this is how he transcends his old artist circle’. In his pursuit of art, Du-feng also admitted that he could never have gained any real depth and maturity without his teacher Daqian from the Windy Hall or transcended without his teacher Jian-fu from the Ling-nan School. Du-feng stated that all he had grasped after decades of unwearied effort was encapsulated in only five words: ‘to go deep and transcend’. Since this time, Du-feng no longer belonged to any school. He was ready to accept famous ancient and modern works with a critical mind. He sought the remarkable elements in each of the three schools that had influenced him. The intricacy of the Neoclassical style lies in tradition and fundamental skills; the intricacy of the Ling-nan style lies in its creativity and its touch of realism; and the style of Shang-hai is remarkable for its expressive use of the brush and ink. Du-feng was greatly enriched and able to seek to represent only a simple and uncluttered pictorial surface with a touch of strong contrast in his structural configuration and programme.

== Later years ==
In 1960 (at age 47), after his last overseas exhibition "Joint Exhibition of Indonesian Paintings and Chinese Paintings" organized by the "Indonesian Chinese Literature Association", Du-feng felt that it was time to return home. As soon as he got back to the mainland, he was assigned the important post of deputy professor in ‘Guangxi Institute of Fine Arts’. Having been away from his home country for over ten years, Du-feng could hardly wait to see the new face of the country. He explored the most charming and scenic spots place where all great Chinese painters endeavored to see. On his journey, he captured almost ever landscape he saw through his highly refined and artistic brush. The materials thereby collected consolidated three later exhibitions held in Xi'an, Beijing and Nanjing. In 1961, he was elected vice-chairman of Chinese Artists association of the Guangxi branch for his attainment has gained high esteem among the artists in the mainland.

Life is busy in Guangxi since he had to teach Chinese painting there. However, the habit of going out to observe and paint which he acquired in his youth and became an indivisible part of his life lured him to look for such an opportunity to try his skill. Among all his paintings, the "Angelfish" has been recognized by critics at home and abroad as one of the best. That is why the "Angelfish" portrait was chosen to be exhibited in the London Exhibition of Chinese Art in 1964. In 1972 and 1973, he attend the two National Art Exhibitions held respectively in Beijing and Guangzhou. He also frequently went out to make visitations to lots of places.

Since 1975, Du-feng has been invited to paint for the national guesthouses all over the country. Those were contributions of large paintings. His work during 1975-1990 exemplified the "ever striving spirit" that he upheld throughout his life.
