= Chen Chi-Ting =

Taiwanese politician and artist

Chen Chi-Ting (陳芷町, 1897–1962) (given name: Fang 方; art name: Huangchai 荒齋), was a politician and artist from Shancun, Shicheng County, Jiangxi Province, China. He was a member of the Seven Friends art society (七友畫會) in Taiwan and was known for his skill in painting bamboo and poetry.

== Life ==
Chen learned from his father, a scholar, from a young age, and graduated from Nanjing Higher Normal School. He worked for newspapers such as Shen Bao (申報), Commercial Press (商報), and Beijing Datong Evening News (大同晚報), and later served as the head of the Political Affairs Bureau and the second bureau of the Presidential Office of the Republic of China due to his writing skills and knowledge. In 1949, Chen resigned from all public positions, went south to Guangzhou and Hong Kong, devoted himself to painting, and held art exhibitions. In 1953, he went to Taiwan and was hired as a national policy advisor by the Presidential Office. He also held solo exhibitions at Taipei Zhongshan Hall.

Chen Chi-ting had relationships with many calligraphy and painting masters, such as Qi Baishi (齊白石), Fu Baoshi (傅抱石), Li Yanshan (李研山), and Chang Dai-chien (張大千). He studied the authentic works of ancient masters such as Su Shi (蘇軾), Ke Jiusi (柯九思), and Wu Zhonggui (吳仲圭). He was recognized by his peers as a top-notch painter of bamboo, and Ye Gongchao praised his bamboo painting as "unique in nearly a century". Chang Dai-chien regarded him as the number one contemporary artist. In his later years, he lived in Taipei and formed the "Seven Friends Painting Society (七友畫會)" with Ma Shou-hua (馬壽華), Kao I-hong (高逸鴻), and others. His works have been published in books such as "Chiting's Bamboo Book (芷町竹譜)", "Chiting's Calligraphy and Painting Selection (芷町書會選)", and "Chen Chiting's Collection of Calligraphy and Painting Works (陳芷町書畫作品集)".
