= Chen Shuren =

Chinese painter

- 陳樹人
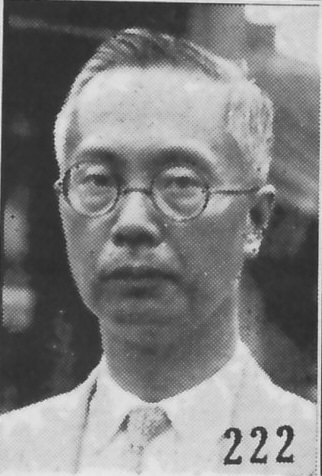
- Chen Shuren as pictured in The Most Recent Biographies of Chinese Dignitaries

Minister of the Overseas Chinese Affairs Commission
- In office 27 May 1932 – 1 May 1947
- Preceded by: Office established
- Succeeded by: Liu Weichi

Personal details
- Born: Chen Zhe; 1884 Mingjing, Panyu, Guangdong, China
- Died: 1948 (aged 63–64)
- Party: Kuomintang (after 1912)
- Other political affiliations: Tongmenghui (1905–1912)

Chen Shuren (Chinese: 陳樹人; 1884–1948) was a Chinese painter. Born Chen Zhe (陳哲), he was renamed Chen Shao (陳韶) and also known by the art names De'an Laoren (得安老人), Jiawai Yuzi (葭外漁子), and Ershan Shanqiao (二山山樵), among others.

== Biography ==
=== Early experiences ===
Born in Mingjing, Panyu, Guangdong, in 1884, Chen studied under painter Ju Lian. In 1903, Chen and two brothers, Gao Jianfu and Gao Qifeng, co-founded the Guangdong Daily. Together, the trio, known collectively by their surnames "Two Gous and one Chan" or as "The three greats of Lingnan", became leaders of the Lingnan school of painting, credited with popularizing the nihonga art style in China. Chen joined the Tongmenghui upon its establishment in 1905.

=== Study aboard and political work ===
In 1906, he left to attend art school in Kyoto (Kyoto City School of Arts and Crafts). In KyotoIn Kyoto, he was exposed to the sketching styles of Kudo Ketsuemon and Yamamoto Chūjiro, and also learned Japanese painting from teachers such as Kawabe Shōfū. He returned to China in 1912 after accepting a teaching position in Guangdong. He went back to Japan in 1913, enrolling at Rikkyo University. Upon completing his studies, Chen remained overseas, serving as secretary general of the Canadian branch of the Kuomintang. He became active in the Guangdong Kuomintang chapter in 1922, the same year he arrived in China. Chen became allied with Wang Jingwei between 1928 and 1931. From 1932 to 1947, Chen led the Overseas Chinese Affairs Commission. He withdrew politically from Wang, who led a Japan-friendly collaborationist government from 1940 to 1944.

== Artistic style ==
=== General discussion ===
At the very beginning, Chen Shuren painted flower-and-bird paintings similar to those of his teacher Ju Lian. Ju lian prefers to first apply water or white powder on the prepared paper, and then add the colors, allowing the colors to blend naturally.Compared with traditional copying of painting manuals, the teaching at Shixiangyuan placed greater emphasis on direct life drawing from real objects. This was in line with the subsequent modern life drawing training he received in Japan.When he was studying in Japan, the reform of Japanese painting was taking place. This enabled him to come into contact with various Japanese art schools.

=== Shanshui painting ===
Chen Shuren referred to the on-site records he made of nature as "copying the scene" . During his travels, he quickly sketched the mountain shapes, trees, roads and water flows using pencils, pens, light ink or watercolors. After returning to his residence, he would then organize these sketches into colored ink paintings on paper.

Chen Shuren's "Guilin Landscape Album" is a typical example of his shanshui paintings. In 1931, Chen Shuren embarked on a political retreat journey to Guilin, Guangxi. During his stay in Guilin, he created a series of paintings and sketches based on the real natural landscapes of the area. In 1932, Chen Shuren's paintings in Guilin were published as a book by Shanghai Heping Publishing House, titled "Guilin Landscape Album". Chen Shuren's depiction of landmark scenic spots and specific topographical elements truly presents the local characteristic landscapes. This approach enables the regional scenery to be accessible to the general public.

== Evaluation ==
Art history usually regards Chen Shuren, Gao Jianfu and Gao Qifeng as the founders of the Lingnan School of Painting.While Chen Shuren was alive, Cai Yuanpei, Xu Beihong, Liu Haisu and others wrote articles or inscribed dedications for his art collections and exhibitions, mainly praising his ability to observe nature, his integration of Chinese and Japanese painting styles, and his formation of his own unique style. However, critics such as Cai Shou and Li Jinfa believed that some of his works were too simplistic, with insufficient structural details and ink thickness in the landscapes.
