= Li Xiongcai =

Chinese painter (1910–2001)

- 黎雄才
- Born: 1910; Gaoyao, Zhaoqing, Qing dynasty
- Died: 19 December 2001 (aged 90–91); Guangzhou, China
- Movement: Lingnan School

Chinese name
- Chinese: 黎雄才
Transcriptions
Standard Mandarin
- Hanyu Pinyin: Lí Xióngcái
- Wade–Giles: Li^{2} Hsiung^{2}ts`ai^{2}
Yue: Cantonese
- Yale Romanization: Lai^{4} Hung^{4}coi^{4}

Li Xiongcai (Chinese: 黎雄才; pinyin: Lí Xióngcái, 1910 – 19 December 2001) was a Chinese landscape painter and educator. A student of Gao Jianfu, he was a prominent member of the Lingnan School who was active predominantly in Guangdong. He painted some 4,000 works, gaining a reputation for combinations of pine trees, stones, and water.

== Biography ==
Li was born in Kengwei Village, part of Baitu Town in Gaoyao, Zhaoqing, Guangdong, in 1910.

In 1926, Li began to study under Gao Jianfu, a co-founder of the Lingnan School of painting. Gao had met Li during a visit to Guangxi and, recognizing his talent, invited the younger man to become his pupil. He concurrently studied at the Chunshui Art Academy and the Guangzhou Liefeng Art School. Sources differ as to Li's time with Gao. According to the art historian Michael Sullivan, Li remained a student of Gao's until 1931, travelling to Japan the following year to further his studies at the Tokyo Academy of Fine Arts (now the Tokyo University of the Arts); this is supported by the Guangdong government's Local Chronicles Office. The historian Ralph Croizier, meanwhile, writes that Li stayed with Gao until 1933, at which time he left for Japan to study in Kyoto. One of his works, Xiaoxiang Rain at Night, won an award at a 1932 exhibition of Chinese art in Belgium.

Li returned to China in the mid-1930s, taking a variety of teaching positions that included the Guangzhou Municipal Art College and the Provincial No. 7 Middle School. In 1943, he was living in Chongqing and teaching at the Chongqing National Fine Arts College. He later became a professor at the Guangzhou Academy of Fine Arts. He spent time as the vice-chairman of the Guangdong Province Art Society.

In the early years of the People's Republic of China, Li painted construction landscapes (jianshe shanshui 建设山水), which celebrated the development of infrastructure like hydraulic engineering. During the Cultural Revolution, Li had little popularity, having rarely painted works with socialist themes. He did, however, incorporate elements of socialist realism.

In 1979, Li travelled to North Korea and Japan. He visited the Philippines, Thailand, and Canada in 1983. Li held several administrative positions, including as a member of the Chinese Painting Research Institute and curator of the Lingnan School of Painting Memorial Hall. He spent time as a member of the National Committee of the Chinese People's Political Consultative Conference.

The Li Xiongcai Art Museum was established in Gaoyao in March 1993. The following year, a touring exhibit of his works made stops in Gaoyao, Guangzhou, Hong Kong, Macau, and Beijing. Li was the first recipient of the China Fine Arts Golden Color Achievement Award, established by the China Federation of Literary and Art Circles, in 2001. Li died in Guangzhou later that year.

== Analysis ==
Li was best known for his landscape paintings, for which he used a graduated rendering method based on sketches made in situ. These works commonly feature pine trees, stones, and water or waterfalls. Several early experiments depicted modern technology such as aircraft, while works completed during the Second Sino-Japanese War included battlefield scenes. Li's oeuvre consists of more than 4,000 paintings, as well as 10,000 drafts. More than a thousand of his works were donated to the Li Xiongcai Art Museum in 1995. Since 2013, Li's representative works have been listed by the National Cultural Heritage Administration as among those Chinese cultural properties not allowed to be exported. Several of his works sold in Chinese auctions for more than ten million yuan, and two of his large works are held by the Embassy of China, Ottawa.

Croizier describes Li as "in some ways the most talented and favorite of Gao's disciples", able to combine elements of his teacher's strong execution with the lyricism of fellow Lingnan master Chen Shuren and the lightplay of Gao Qifeng. The Chinese art critic Wen Yuanming, similarly, described Li as "easily the most promising and brilliant of Mr. Gao's pupils". In his later work, Li experimented with other approaches, including efforts to modernize traditional landscape painting. However, unlike fellow Gao Jianfu student Guan Shanyue, the influences of the Lingnan School remain strong.

== Works cited ==
- 【广东美术百年21大家】黎雄才 [[21 Guangdong Artists of the Past 100 Years] Li Xiongcai] (in Chinese). Guangdong Museum of Art. Archived from the original on 3 November 2024.
- 当代国画家——黎雄才 [Contemporary Chinese Painter – Li Xiongcai] (in Chinese). Guangdong Provincial People's Government Local Chronicles Office. 18 August 2023. Archived from the original on 12 March 2025.
- Croizier, Ralph (1988). Art and Revolution in Modern China: The Lingnan (Cantonese) School of Painting, 1906–1951. Berkeley: University of California Press. ISBN 978-0-520-33696-4.
- Ho, Christine I.; Schmalzer, Sigrid (2026). "Introduction". In Ho, Christine I.; Schmalzer, Sigrid (eds.). A Revolution Across Art and Science: Participatory Knowledge Production In China's Great Leap Forward. Hong Kong: Hong Kong University Press. ISBN 978-988-8946-77-8.
- Li, Chu-Tsing (1979). "Trends in Modern Chinese Painting: (The C.A. Drenowatz Collection)". Artibus Asiae: Supplementum. 36: III–248. doi:10.2307/1522692. JSTOR 1522692.
- Lu Youzhe (吕友者) (6 May 2014). 岭南画派的艺术及市场 [The Art Market of the Lingnan School]. Oriental Collection (in Chinese). Archived from the original on 1 October 2024 – via Sina.com.
- Sullivan, Michael (2006). Modern Chinese Artists: A Biographical Dictionary. Berkeley, California: University of California Press. ISBN 978-0-520-24449-8.
