= Ju Chao =

Chinese painter (1811–1865)

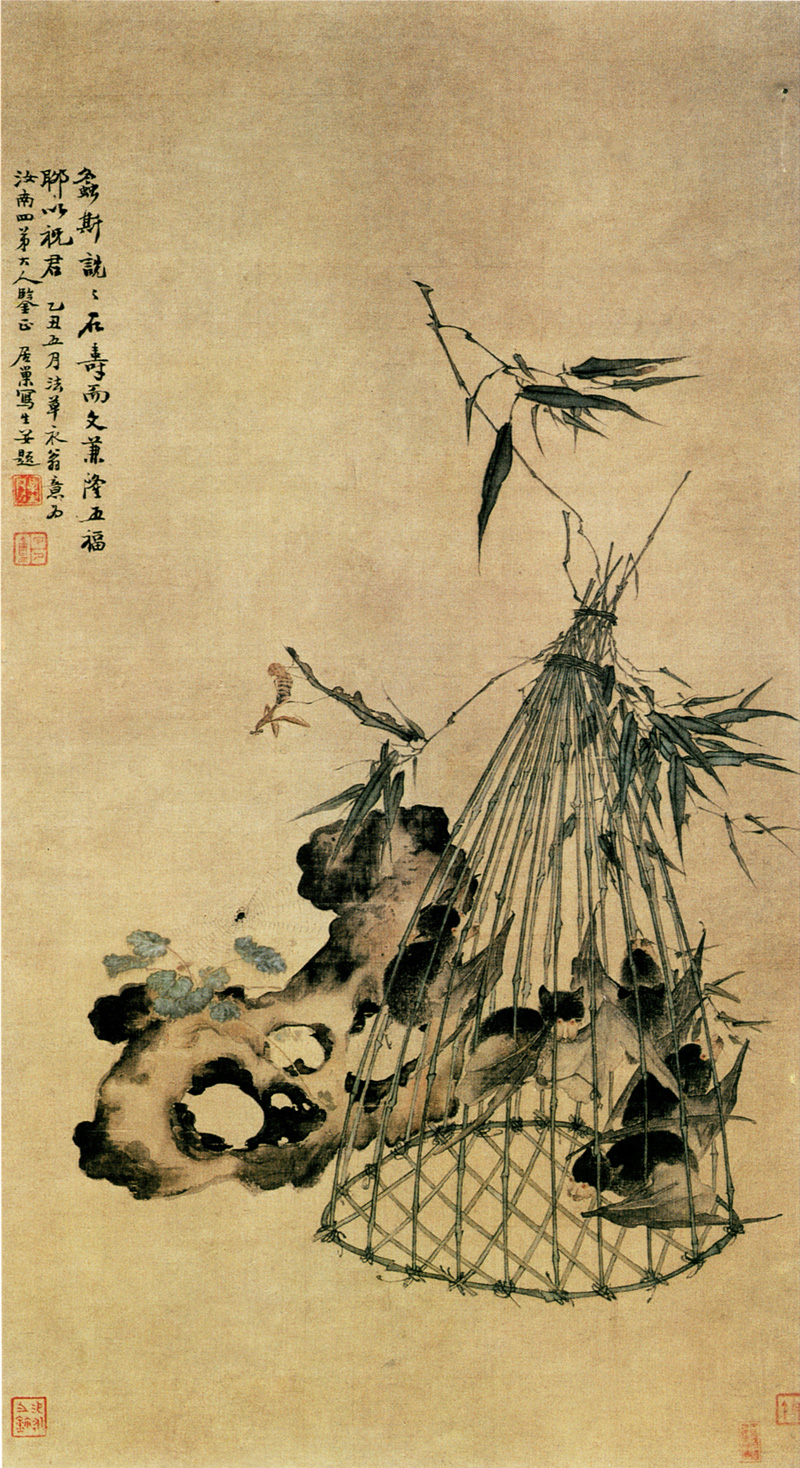
Five Bats (五福图), Ju Chao, Guangdong Provincial Museum

Ju Chao (Chinese: 居巢; pinyin: Jū Cháo; Wade–Giles: Chü Ch'ao; 1811–1865), a native of Panyu (番禺), now Guangzhou, was a famed Chinese painter in the Qing dynasty. His courtesy name was Meisheng (梅生), and pseudonym Meichao (梅巢) or Guquan. He was the older brother (or cousin) of the painter Ju Lian. He wrote "Poems of Shouxie Shi" (首邪室诗) and "Yanyu Ci" (烟语词).
