= Li Yanshan =

Li Yanshan 李研山
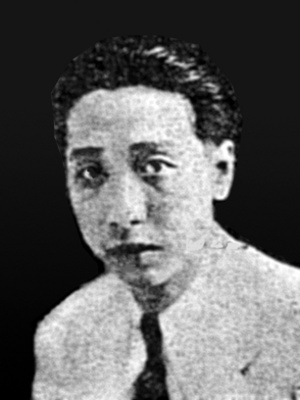
- Headmaster of the Guangzhou Municipal College of Art (1932–1936)
- Born: Li Yaochen (李耀辰); 20 November 1898; Xinhui, Guangdong, China
- Died: 11 May 1961 (aged 62); Hong Kong
- Known for: Painting
- Movement: Guohua

Li Yanshan
- Traditional Chinese: 李研山
- Simplified Chinese: 李研山
Transcriptions
Standard Mandarin
- Hanyu Pinyin: Lǐ Yánshān
- Wade–Giles: Li Yen-shan

Li Yanshan (Chinese: 李研山; pinyin: Lǐ Yánshān; 20 November 1898 – 11 May 1961) (given name: Yaochen 耀辰; courtesy name: Juduan 居端; art name: Yanshan 研山) was a renowned Chinese guohua painter, calligraphist, poet, art educator and Chinese art connoisseur. He was also hailed as a master of guohua landscape painting.

== Biography ==
Born into a well-off family with generations of scholars in the Pearl River Delta region in Guangdong province of Qing dynasty China, Li received a solid education in classical Chinese literature at a very early age. His passion and talent in art emerged when he began his high school education in Guangzhou where Pan He, a famous Guangdong guohua painter, was in charge of the Art Department. Li commenced his proper training in painting with Pan and became his protege.

After graduating from high school in 1918, Li was admitted to the Faculty of Law at Peking University. However, his passion in art had only grown stronger. He took every opportunity while he was studying in Beijing to meet up with famous painters and collectors so as to increase his exposure to the precious legacy of the world of Chinese paintings. Meanwhile, under the influence of the then President of the Peking University, Cai Yuanpei, who was an enthusiast of Western Art, Li had also taken course in Western painting under the famous artist Xu Beihong.

Li returned to Guangdong after his graduation from Peking University. He began his career in civil services as a county’s education department section chief. Since 1926, he held various legal service positions in Shantou and Guangzhou, and eventually became a principal judge of the municipal court of Guangzhou.

In 1925, he joined and became an active member of the Chinese Painting Research Society (CPRS) in Guangzhou, which was organised by his painting teacher Pan He and many other famous guohua painters. The aim of the CPRS was, in essence, to affirm the importance of a comprehensive understanding of the traditional Chinese cultural values and painting techniques as a viable developing strategy for the future of Chinese painting. As Li became a standing committee member in the year 1928, his destiny as a full-time painter was imminent. The CPRS had managed to attract some 182 members at the time, many of them were well known artists, and had organised regular exhibitions and publications of their members’ art works to promote their belief. It was then the largest art body in southern China.

Li resigned from his position as the principal judge and launched his career in art education as the fourth Headmaster of the Guangzhou Municipal College of Art in 1932. The 34 years old Headmaster brought with him new blood and new ideas into the College, his contribution was especially prominent in the expanding and ameliorating of the department of Chinese painting.

In 1936, Li left the Headmaster office and set out on an extensive trip to experience the many unique landscapes throughout China.

Life was tough for everyone in China during the Second Sino-Japanese War (1937–1945), there was no exception for artists. However, Li did not give up on his painting career while taking refuge in various cities including Hong Kong and Macau, where he was patronised by a few of his wealthy admirers.

The war finally ended in September 1945, Li walked all the way from Maoming back to his birthplace Xinhui (about 271 km). He finished a long scroll painting titled A Land Untarnished as a commemoration to the end of the war. This was the last painting he had made in his hometown, soon he left for Guangzhou and re-established himself in the next three years as a top ranking guohua painters through participating in various art promotion activities and joint exhibitions.

Li Yanshan originally planned for a short trip to Hong Kong in the summer of 1948, which turned out to be his final settlement. Many painters from Mainland China came to Hong Kong around the time the Communist took over China in 1949. Li and a few others including Chang Dai-chien, Gao Jian-fu held a joint exhibition in Hong Kong from the 6th to the 9th of March, 1949, and in the following year another joint exhibition with Puru, Chao Shao-ang and a few others. Finally in 1951, Li had his solo exhibition, which was also his last one before his death in 1961. Besides painters, many serious collectors also came to Hong Kong with their precious collections. Li being a renowned connoisseur was often invited to their salons.

Towards the last decade of his life, Li chose to lead a very low profile life in his tranquil studio, spending most of his time painting and exploring the essence of guohua. Due to the fact that he only spared little time to give painting lessons and set demanding prerequisite for admission, not very many could become his students.

In 1959, Puru visited Hong Kong, he was well aware of Li Yanshan as a painter but not personally acquainted with him. Having seen a few of Li’s originals, Puru requested Li’s friend to arrange for a visit to Li’s studio. The two masters had a great time discussing art and poetry and improvised in calligraphy and paintings for each other.
