= Lingnan Fine Arts Museum =

Museum in Nangang, Taipei, Taiwan

- 嶺南美術館
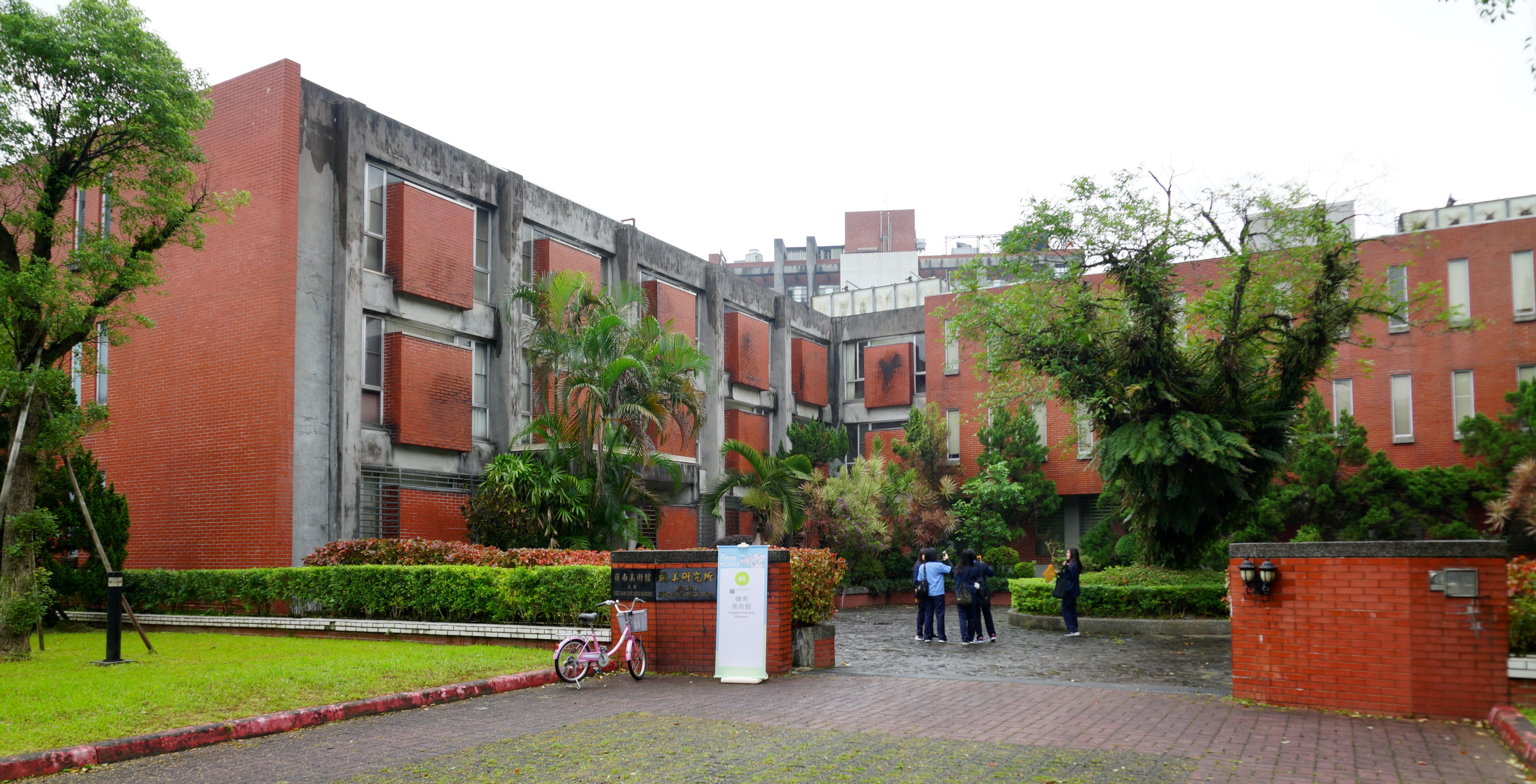
- Established: 2002
- Location: Nangang, Taipei, Taiwan
- Coordinates: 25°02′25″N 121°36′54″E
- Type: art museum
- Website: Official website (in Chinese)

The Lingnan Fine Arts Museum (traditional Chinese: 嶺南美術館; simplified Chinese: 岭南美术馆; pinyin: Lǐngnán Měishùguǎn) of the Academia Sinica is an art museum in Nangang District, Taipei, Taiwan.

== History ==
The museum was established in June 2002 by the Academia Sinica after receiving various art works from inside and outside of Taiwan.

== Exhibitions ==
The museums features the first professional archive of Lingnan paintings in Taiwan, famous for its innovation in modern Chinese art history. Overall it has more than 120 art works from notable artists.

== Transportation ==
The museum is accessible within walking distance south from Taipei Nangang Exhibition Center Station of the Taipei Metro.

== See also ==
- List of museums in Taiwan
- Academia Sinica
