= Ju Lian =

Chinese painter (1828–1904)

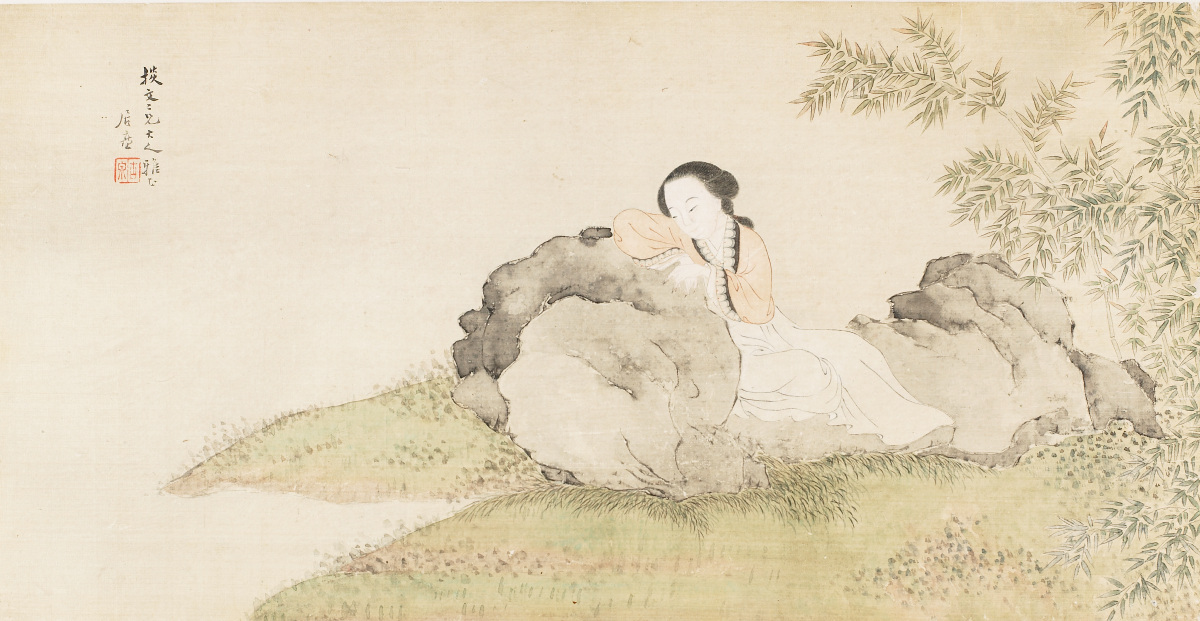
Lady by Ju Lian, in the collection of the Birmingham Museum of Art

Ju Lian (Chinese: 居廉; pinyin: Jū Lián; Wade–Giles: Chü Lien; 1828–1904), a native of Panyu (番禺, now Guangzhou, was a Chinese painter in Qing Dynasty. His courtesy name was 'Ancient Spring' (Gu Quan 古泉), and self-given pseudonym 'Old Man of the Divided Mountain' (Ge Shan Lao Ren 隔山老人). He was the younger brother (or cousin) of the painter Ju Chao. He was known for his bird-and-flower paintings as well as people and plant-and-insect paintings. He was the teacher of the brothers Gao Jianfu and Gao Qifeng.
