= Chao Shao-an =

Chinese painter (1905–1998)

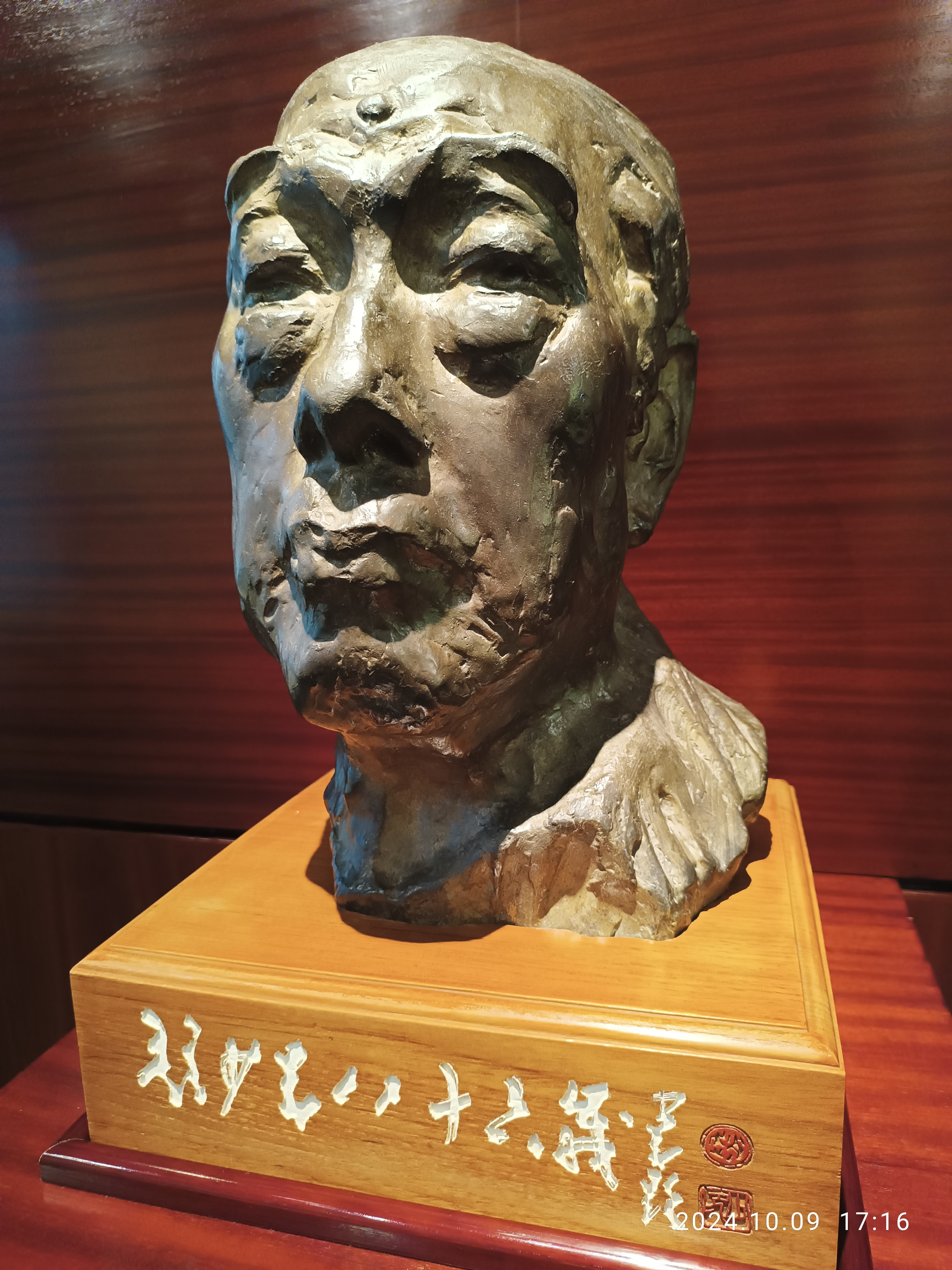
Bust sculpture of Chao Shao-an, Hong Kong Heritage Museum

Chao Shao-an or Zhao Shao'ang (Chinese: 趙少昂; 1905, Guangdong – 1998) was a Chinese artist of the Lingnan School of painting. He is noted for his unconventional subject matter and for introducing Western art techniques such as shadow and perspective into Chinese painting. In 1984, he was made a Member of the Order of the British Empire (MBE) in recognition of his contributions to the arts in Hong Kong.

== Galleries that feature his work ==
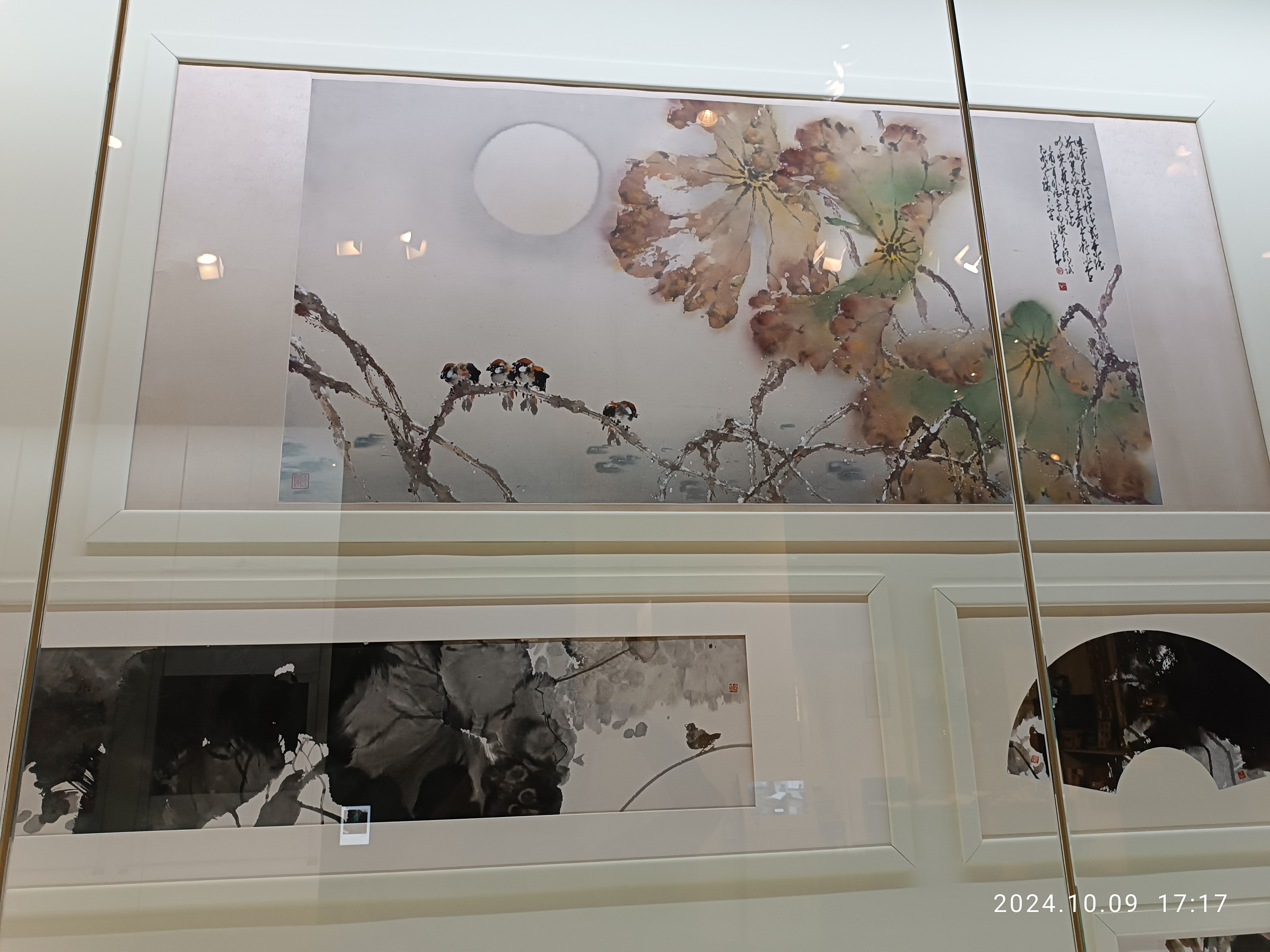
Chao Shao-an Gallery at the Hong Kong Heritage Museum

- Chao Shao-an Gallery in the Hong Kong Heritage Museum
- Guangzhou Museum of Art
- Chao Shao-an art at the Asian Art Museum of San Francisco

== Works cited ==
- Croizier, Ralph (1988). Art and Revolution in Modern China: The Lingnan (Cantonese) School of Painting, 1906–1951. Berkeley: University of California Press. ISBN 978-0-520-33696-4.
