= Gao Jianfu =

Chinese artist (1879–1951)

- 高剑父
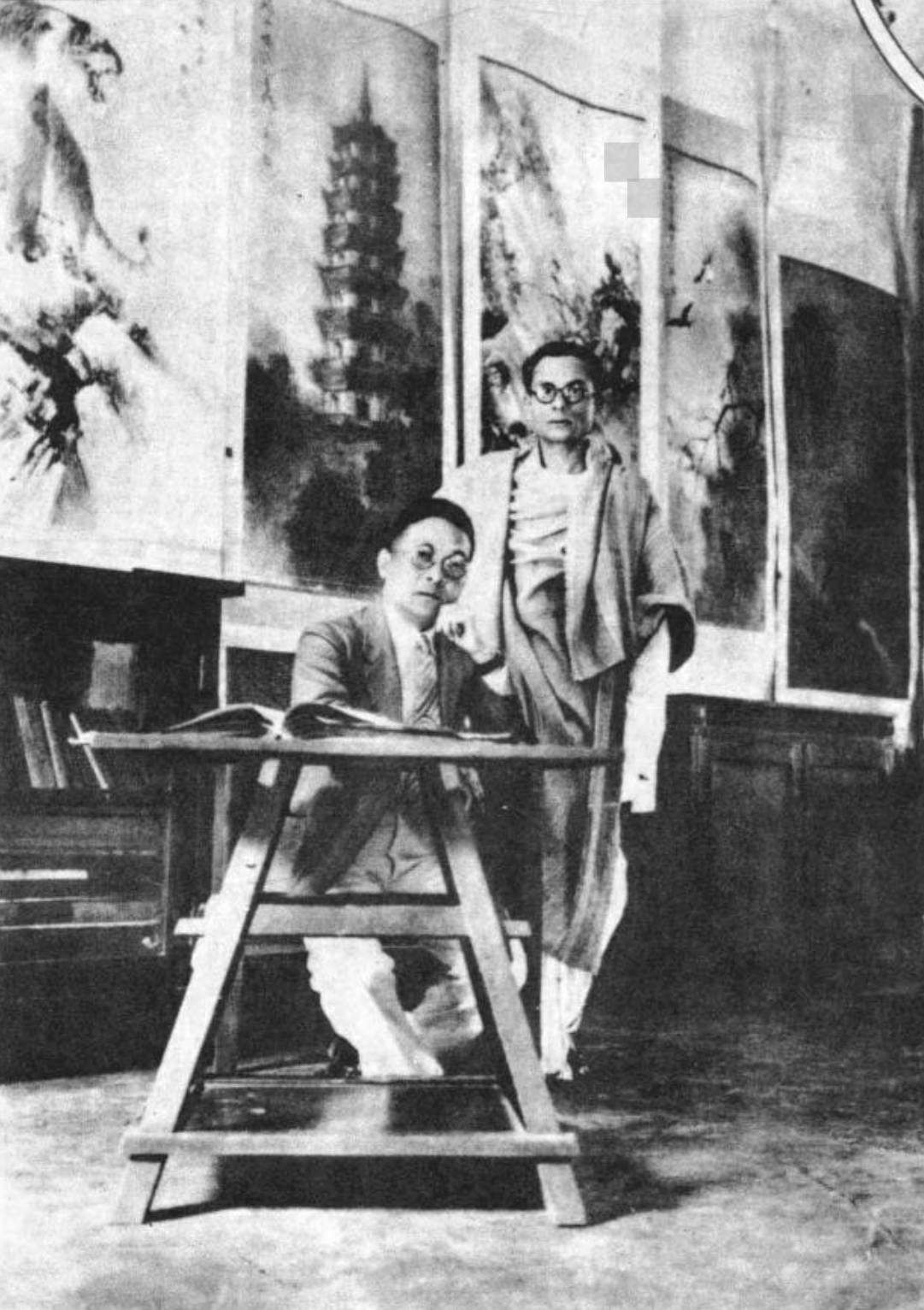
- Gao (center) during an exhibition of his paintings
- Born: 1879
- Died: 1951 (aged 71–72)
- Education: He entered the studio of Chinese artist Ju Lian; Lingnan University
- Occupation: Artist
- Known for: Leading the Lingnan School's effort to modernize Chinese traditional painting

Gao Jianfu
- Traditional Chinese: 高劍父
- Simplified Chinese: 高剑父
Transcriptions
Standard Mandarin
- Hanyu Pinyin: Gāo Jiànfù
- IPA: [káʊ.tɕjɛ̂n.fû]
Yue: Cantonese
- Yale Romanization: Gōu Gim-fuh
- Jyutping: Gou1 Gim3-fu6
- IPA: [kɔw˥ kim˧.fu˨]

Gao Jianfu (Chinese: 高劍父, pronounced "Gou Gim Fu" in Cantonese; 1879–1951) was a Chinese artist active before and during World War II. He is known for leading the Lingnan School's effort to modernize Chinese traditional painting as a "new national art". Along with his brother Gao Qifeng and friend Chen Shuren, Gao Jianfu brought the nihonga style of painting to China.

== Early life ==
Gao Jianfu was born in 1879 in the city of Canton, located in the Guangdong Province.

== Education ==
When Gao Jianfu was thirteen, he entered the studio of Chinese artist Ju Lian in Lishan, and for the next seven years he acted as his apprentice. During his time with Ju Lian, Gao Jianfu painted in a similar style as his master: bright, colorful, and realistic. The subject matter of his paintings were mainly birds, flowers, and landscapes. At Ju Lian's studio, Gao Jianfu became close friends with Chen Shuren, a fellow artist.

In 1903, Gao Jianfu began working under the painter and collector Wu Deyi. Here he was introduced to works of the Chinese tradition.

He studied at the Canton Christian College, now known as Lingnan University. Two of his most influential instructors included "a French teacher of painting only known by his Chinese name, Mai La", and Yamamoto Baigai, one of the many Japanese teachers then in China. Greatly inspired by his professors, Jianfu felt compelled to leave for Tokyo.

== Time in Japan ==
In the winter of 1906, Gao Jianfu left for Tokyo. After spending some time there and finding himself poor and without much food, he returned to Canton for the summer. In 1907, Jianfu returned to Tokyo with his nineteen-year-old brother, Gao Qifeng. They met up with their friend Chen Shuren.

During his time in Japan, the three men were exposed to the nationalist debates "then ranging in the Japanese art world over the modernizing impact of Western art on Japan's local artistic traditions." Jianfu became interested in the syntheses of Western and traditional approaches, which were parallel to work in the contemporary Japanese art world. Jianfu, along with his peers of the Lingnan School, saw this blend of styles as a model for modern national art. Many of the Lingnan students joined Sun Yat-sen's anti-Qing Dynasty movement, a revolutionary nationalist movement. Later, Gao joined the Chinese Assassination Corps, a Chinese anarchist group.

== Artwork ==
Jianfu once wrote: "I think we should not only take in elements of Western painting. If there are good points in Indian painting, Egyptian painting, Persian painting, or masterpieces of other countries, we should embrace all of them too, as nourishment for Chinese painting."

Although Jianfu was greatly interested in Western art and joined societies that promoted this style, his artwork during his time in Japan shows little influence of Western art. His art mainly reflects the work of nihonga painters like Kano Hogai, Hashimoto Gaho, and Takeuchi Seiho. Often Jianfu would paint flowers, plants, and grasses. He also took inspiration from traditional Chinese artists Tang Yin and Lan Ying.

In the 1920s, Jianfu's paintings showcased elements of "realism derived from Western art", as well as traditional Chinese ink and brushwork. The subject matter of his work strayed away from the themes of traditional art (i.e. flowers, birds, landscapes, etc.) and focused more on contemporary reality.

In 1927 the connection between his art and political agenda was made clear with the unveiling of a new exhibit in Canton. The series of airplane paintings showcased a banner with Sun Yat-sen's slogan, "Aviation to Save the Country". This propaganda can especially be seen in Jianfu's paintings, "New Battlefield", "Air Defense", and "Flying in the Rain".

Throughout his time in Macao during World War II, Jianfu painted Skulls Crying over the Nation's Fate. It depicted a pile of skulls lying in a field of grass.

== Later years ==
=== Work with Gao Qifeng ===
In 1912, after the overthrow of the Qing Dynasty, Gao Jianfu and his brother moved to Shanghai. They began publishing a journal titled Zhen xiang huabao (The True Record). It featured articles on art and politics, as well as published essays promoting a new, modernized national art in China. Although it ran for only a year, the journal was one of the first to bring art to the public. The brothers advocated government support of the arts. The two also opened the nation's first public galleries for the exhibit and sale of art works, the Aesthetic Bookstore.

Jianfu and Qifeng stayed in Shanghai till 1918. By 1923, the brothers established the Spring Awakening Art Academy in Canton.

=== Later life ===
In 1929, Jianfu was accused of anti-foreign sentiments during his time as the chief organizer of the government's first National Art Exhibition held in Nanking. Because The Lingnan School was featured prominently, there was hostile response for the inclusion of non-Chinese artistic tendencies.

In 1936, Jianfu began teaching at Sun Yat-Sen University. He continued to publish articles, where he defended his concept of new national art. He suggested that national painting abandon the "elitism" of traditional art, and engage more directly with the Chinese public.

In 1938, Gao Jianfu left Japanese-occupied Canton for the island of Macau. He returned to Canton in 1945. At the time Mao Zedong came to power in 1949, Jianfu once again fled to Macau.

He died in 1951.
