= Yu Yongfu =

Chinese businessman

- 俞永福 / Yú Yǒngfú
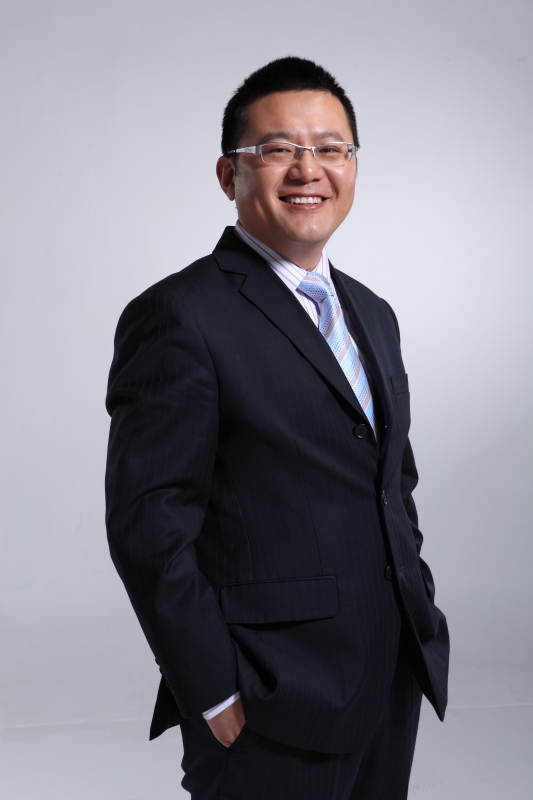
- Yu Yongfu
- Born: 18 August 1976 (age 50); Inner Mongolia, China
- Education: Nankai University
- Occupations: CEO, UCWeb; President, Alibaba UC Mobile business group

Yu Yongfu (Chinese: 俞永福; pinyin: Yú Yǒngfú; born 18 August 1976) is a Chinese entrepreneur and chief executive of UCWeb Inc., a Chinese mobile Internet and software service best known for its popular UC Browser.

Born in Inner Mongolia, China, Yu later moved with his parents to Tianjin, where he attended Nankai University and graduated with a bachelor's degree in Business Management. In early 2001, he joined the venture capital firm Legend Capital as founding employee and worked his way up to vice president.

He joined UCWeb in 2006 as chief executive officer. During his tenure, the company has expanded from 6 employees and a single product to about 3000 employees and diversified product offerings.

Yu is also the president of Alibaba UC mobile business group, an entity incorporated after UCWeb was fully acquired by Alibaba Group in June 2014 in the largest Chinese internet M&A deal.
