= Sino-Japanese =

Sino-Japanese is often used to mean:

- Sino-Japanese vocabulary: That portion of the Japanese vocabulary that is of Chinese origin or makes use of morphemes of Chinese origin (similar to the use of Latin/Greek in English).
- Kanbun: A Japanese method of reading annotated Classical Chinese in translation; writing with literary Chinese for Japanese readers.
- The on'yomi or 'Chinese reading' of Chinese characters in Japanese.

"Sino-Japanese" is also used to refer to that which occurs between China and Japan, such as:

- The First Sino-Japanese War between 1894 and 1895, primarily over control of Korea.
- The Second Sino-Japanese War between 1937 (some say the true start date is 1931) and 1945, from 1941 on as part of World War II
- Sino-Japanese relations
- Sino-Japanese Journalist Exchange Agreement
- Chinese people in Japan
- Japanese Chinese cuisine, the style of Chinese cuisine served by Chinese in Japan
- Japanese people settled in China, and/or their descendants
- Japanese orphans in China
- People of mixed Chinese and Japanese descent

== See also ==
- Japanese China (disambiguation)
