= Shenma =

Chinese search engine

Shenma Inc.
- Website type: Private
- Founded: April 2014; 12 years ago
- Headquarters: Beijing, China
- Owners: Alibaba Group and UCWeb
- Key people: Liang Jie, President
- Industry: Internet
- Website: sm.cn

Shenma Inc. (Chinese: 神马搜索; pinyin: Shénmǎ Sōusuǒ; lit. 'god horse search') is a "mobile-first" search engine for China that was launched in April 2014. It is a joint venture between Alibaba Group and UCWeb.

== Overview ==
In April 2017, according to China Internet Watch, Shenma had an 8.8% of the China search engine market share, which made it the second most used search engine after Baidu. Shenma comes with UC Browser, a mobile browser with an estimated 20% share of China's browser market and over 30% of China's mobile browser marketshare. Shenma search was co-founded as a mobile search engine by UCWeb and Alibaba in 2013. In 2014, Alibaba acquired UCWeb.

== Litigation ==
On April 13, 2020, Shenma filed a lawsuit against Sogou for traffic hijacking.

In the filing, the mobile search company accused Sougou of misleading and reeling in potential Shenma users through Sogou Input Method, and for illegally trafficking data. Shenma told the court that the hijacked traffic data reached 1.897 billion. Shenma was seeking RMB 102 million (around $16 million in American dollars) in compensation.

On June 27, 2019, the Beijing Haidian Court ruled that the Sogou search company was guilty of hijacking UC browser and Shenma search traffic through candidate words, constituted unfair competition. They were sentenced to pay a fine of 20 million yuan.
