= Liao Chengzhi =

Chinese politician (1908–1983)

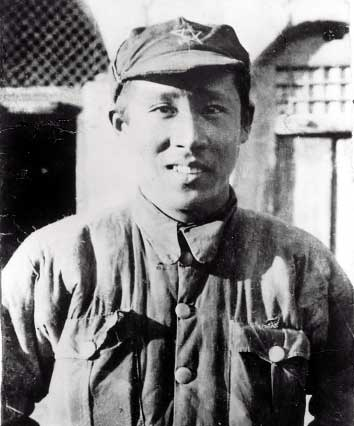
- Liao in the late 1940s

Director of the Overseas Chinese Affairs Office

Personal details
- Born: 25 September 1908 Okubo, Tokyo, Japan
- Died: 10 June 1983 (aged 74) Peking Union Medical College Hospital, Beijing, China
- Party: Chinese Communist Party
- Relations: Liao Zhongkai (father); He Xiangning (mother); Liao Mengxing (sister)
- Children: Liao Hui

Liao Chengzhi (Chinese: 廖承志; pinyin: Liào Chéngzhì; 25 September 1908 – 10 June 1983) was a Chinese politician. He joined the Chinese Communist Party in 1928, and rose to the position of director of the Xinhua News Agency; after 1949, he worked in various positions related to foreign affairs, most prominently president of the Beijing Foreign Languages Institute, president of the Sino-Japanese Friendship Society, and Minister of the Office of Overseas Chinese Affairs.

== Early life ==
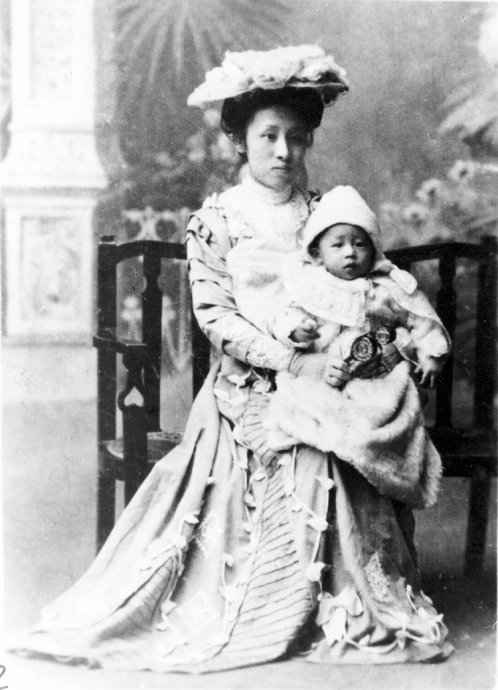
Liao Chengzhi in 1909, held by his mother He Xiangning

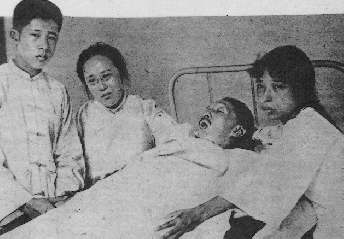
Liao Chengzhi, He Xiangning, and Liao Mengxing at Liao Zhongkai's side after his death

Liao was born in the Ōkubo neighbourhood of Tokyo in 1908 to father Liao Zhongkai and mother He Xiangning. His father had wanted to study abroad ever since he was a student at Hong Kong's Queen's College; he left his wife behind in Hong Kong to pursue his studies in Tokyo in January 1903, but she joined him there just three months later. She pursued education there as well, taking time off after young Liao was born, but returning to school just six months later. Liao was overweight as a child; even his own parents referred to him as "fatty" (Hakka: 肥仔). His parents became members of the Kuomintang very early on; Sun Yat-sen was a frequent visitor to their household, sparking the young Liao's interest in politics. His family moved frequently; the young Liao attended school in Tokyo, Shanghai, and Guangzhou.

Liao returned to his parents' home of Guangdong in 1923, where he entered the middle school attached to Lingnan University. He first met Zhou Enlai, who was then an instructor at the Whampoa Military Academy in Guangzhou, the following year. Under Zhou's influence, Liao became further interested in politics, and joined the Kuomintang. In June 1925, he was one of the leaders of a protest march in Guangzhou which was fired upon by British and French troops, in what became known as the Shaji Incident; Liao himself had his hat shot off, and barely escaped with his life. His father was assassinated two months later by a member of a rival faction in the Kuomintang. In 1927, fearing for her family's lives, his mother took Liao and his siblings back into exile in Tokyo. The following year, he not only entered Waseda University, but also joined the Tokyo branch of the Chinese Communist Party (CCP), which provoked the university to expel him. His political activities also attracted unfavourable attention from the Japanese government, which deported him in the summer of that year; he then proceeded to Shanghai.

In November 1928, Liao went to Berlin, Germany, where he both studied and continued his political activities. His mother, who had returned to China from Japan, soon left the country again in disgust with Chiang Kai-shek's government; she first went to Paris where she made a living selling paintings before joining her son in Berlin. His mother would return to Shanghai with Soong Ching-ling in September 1931, just after the Mukden Incident, to join the anti-Japanese resistance movement. Around the same time, Liao was arrested by German police and deported again; he followed his mother to Shanghai in 1932. He then became secretary of the Communist Party Group of the National Seamen's Union. His political activities again brought him trouble, leading to his arrest in March 1933; however, he was released due to the efforts of Soong Ching-ling. Back in Shanghai, Liao struck up a relationship with Jing Puchun (经普椿); her father Jing Hengyi, a painter, was Liao's mother's friend, former classmate in Japan, and neighbour. Jing Puchun had come from Zhejiang to Shanghai with her elder brother to visit him. She was just 16 at the time. Her elder brother objected strenuously to their relationship, due to Liao's CCP membership; he feared his sister would get mixed up in political conflicts. In mid-July, her elder brother took her back to Zhejiang. The two kept in touch by letters; in August 1933, when Liao received CCP orders sending him to the Sichuan–Shaanxi revolutionary base area, he asked Jing in a letter to "wait for me for two years, if you truly love me".

== Fighting the Nationalists and Japan ==
In August 1933, Liao bid farewell to his mother and, under the orders of the Party, proceeded to the Sichuan-Shaanxi area carrying Kuomintang codes which would allow the Communists to decrypt their telegraph messages. After his arrival there, he became Secretary of the Politburo of the Chinese Red Army's New Fourth Army. However, he offended his superior Zhang Guotao by pointing out some of his ideological errors; Zhang Guotao criticised Liao as a "member of a Kuomintang family" and had him arrested. He spent two more years in a CCP prison, and thus ended the Long March as a criminal, but was restored to good standing in the Party in late 1936 while in northern Shaanxi by Mao Zedong and his old friend Zhou Enlai. He then began his work with the Red China News Agency, Xinhua's forerunner, where he put his international experience to good use, translating news into English, French, German, and Japanese.

In December 1937, as the Second Sino-Japanese War intensified, he was sent to Hong Kong, where he ran the Eighth Route Army's office. Among other matters, he was responsible for arms purchases for the CCP's Southern Bureau. His work there formed the foundation of what would become the CCP's united front strategy in the territory, aimed at using Hong Kong's economic resources and connections to overseas Chinese communities to fund CCP aims; indeed, while in Hong Kong, Liao cultivated relations and alliances with the territory's "big capitalists". His mother arranged for Jing Puchun to be sent there as well, as a surprise for her son; the two had a joyous reunion at the docks as Liao stepped off his ship, and married soon after, on 11 January 1938. Liao left Hong Kong in January 1941, but after the Imperial Japanese Army invaded and occupied the city, he was chosen for his fluency in Japanese along with Lian Guan to sneak back in and establish contact with fellow revolutionaries who had been trapped there; by May, he had helped over 500 people escape from Hong Kong, including his mother, Soong Ching-ling, Mao Dun, Xia Yan, Liang Shuming, Cai Chusheng, Liu Yazi, Hu Feng, Hu Sheng, and Zou Taofen (邹韬奋).

However, Liao's work was interrupted on 30 May 1942, when he was arrested in Guangdong's Lechang, Shaoguan area. His captors transported him to southern Jiangxi and held in the Majiazhou Prison Camp in Taihe. His arrest was the result of a long investigation by the KMT, and would prove the undoing of the CCP's organisation in southern China; in the following months, the KMT arrested hundreds of other CCP members. His mother, Dong Biwu, and Zhou Enlai all wrote letters to KMT authorities pleading for Liao's life, in which they stressed the need for unity against the Japanese and the common revolutionary origin of the KMT and the CCP, reflected in Liao's father's relationship with Sun Yat-sen; in the end, Chiang Kai-shek was moved to spare Liao's life. Chiang's son Chiang Ching-kuo was assigned to supervise Liao's captivity. His personal connections notwithstanding, Liao was subject to poor conditions and various tortures during his imprisonment, and developed lung disease as a result. However, such was the respect of his fellow revolutionaries for him that even while in prison, he was elected as an alternate member of the CCP's Politburo by the representatives of the 7th National Congress in Yan'an in April 1945.

In January 1946, Chiang Kai-shek sent a telegram to the prison camp in Ganzhou where the young Liao was being held, directing that he be flown to the KMT's seat of government, then still located in Chongqing. Liao's treatment improved markedly upon his arrival; he was given a new suit of clothes and better food to eat. Chiang tried to pressure Liao into renouncing his affiliation with the CCP, but Liao refused. Soon after, on 22 January, in accordance with the terms of the Double Tenth Agreement between the KMT and the CCP, Liao was released and returned to Yan'an, where his wife was waiting for him. Upon his return, he was named head of the Xinhua News Agency. However, again his reunion with his wife was brief; the CCP soon dispatched Liao to the Taihang Mountains on Xinhua-related work.

== After 1949 ==
In the 1960s, Liao led Chinese delegations in a number of negotiations with Japanese counterparts, including in discussions which led to the Sino-Japanese Journalist Exchange Agreements.

In 1960, Liao warned that Communist China "shall not hesitate to take positive action to have Hong Kong, Kowloon and New Territories liberated" should the status quo (i.e. colonial administration) be changed. The warning killed any democratic development in Hong Kong for the next three decades.

Even as he turned 70, Liao remained active and busy in politics, in 1978 heading up the newly established Hong Kong and Macau Affairs Office and the newly revived Overseas Chinese Affairs Office, of whose predecessor he had been the head up until 1970. He also continued to play an important role in Sino-Japanese relations, accompanying Deng Xiaoping on his visit to Japan, meeting with Prime Minister Takeo Fukuda. In March 1980, with his health worsening, Liao flew to the United States to undergo coronary artery bypass surgery at the Stanford University's Medical Center. He remained overweight even in his twilight years; after his surgery, his wife tried to manage his diet more closely, but he continued to eat fatty foods and smoke the occasional cigarette. In 1982, he received an honorary doctorate from his alma mater of Waseda. On 25 July of the same year, the People's Daily published Liao's open letter to his old jailer Chiang Ching-kuo, who by then had risen to the position of President of the Republic of China. Addressing Chiang as "my brother", he again touched upon the theme of the common origin of the two parties, and urged Chiang to take proactive steps towards Chinese unification.

Liao died of a heart attack at 5:22 AM on 10 June 1983 in Beijing. His death came at an untimely juncture for China, as he was nominated for the position of Vice President of the People's Republic of China only four days earlier. Chinese President Li Xiannian gave a memorial speech at his funeral.
