= Sinorbis =

- Website type: Marketing-related software as a service
- Founded: June 2016
- Founders: Nicolas Chu; Allen Qu
- Industry: Marketing
- Website: http://www.sinorbis.com

Sinorbis is a software as a service (SaaS) company that offers subscriptions to a cloud-based digital marketing platform. The software aims to facilitate Higher Education institutions and businesses who wish to enter the Asian market.

Founded in June 2016, by Nicolas Chu, Allen Qu, Dandan Cheng and Dhruv Parashar, after having raised $1.5 million. The company is headquartered in Sydney, with additional offices in Shanghai, North America, Europe, and Colombo.

== History ==
The name Sinorbis is a compound of Latin words "Sina", meaning "China", and "Orbis", meaning the world.

A second round of funding, led by outdoor advertising firm Executive Channel Holdings (ECH) and was concluded in May 2017, raised a further $2.3 million, bringing the startup's total fund to $3.8 million. Along with the second round of funding, Sinorbis announced several new appointment to its advisory board, including Bruce Fink, Principal of privately held Bickham Court Group of Companies and Executive Chair of ECH; Charles Parry-Okeden, the Global CEO of ECH; Chris Winterburn, Managing Director of Media i.

The first version of its cloud-based digital marketing platform was commercialised in July 2017. The following year, in September 2018, Sinorbis closed a $4 million Series A funding round led by Jelix Ventures. Another funding round took place in August 2021, bringing the company's total funding to $9.4 million.

In 2022, Sinorbis announced the launch of its Pan-Asian marketing platform, expanding from being an app for China to becoming an integrated marketing platform for the whole of Asia, allowing users to publish, engage and measure their digital activities across various Asian channels.

== Product ==
Sinorbis' cloud-based marketing platform offers digital marketing, search engine optimization and web development tools designed to help companies establish a web and social media presence in China. Through the platform, companies are able to build websites that are visible within the Great Firewall, and localized and optimized for China's four major search engines: Baidu, Sogou, 360 and Shenma. Additionally, the Sinorbis Wizard tool uses machine learning to recommend website optimization updates.

Since the launch of its software, the company has developed a diverse client base and gained a strong foothold in the international education sector, collaborating with universities in the US, Australia, New Zealand, the UK and all over Europe. In response to the COVID-19 pandemic, Sinorbis made its technology available for free to international education providers.

In 2020, the company also added webinar marketing tools and Zoom integrations to its features.

The company's infrastructure is hosted via Alibaba Cloud and Amazon Web Services.

== Media coverage ==
CEO and co-founder Nicolas Chu has appeared twice on Australia's Sky News Business channel, where he discussed the business opportunities posed by the Chinese digital market. He was also interviewed on ABC Local Radio program The World Today on 2 June 2016.

== Awards ==
On 28 June 2018 Sinorbis was recognised as 'Marketing Technology Company of the Year' at the annual Mumbrella Awards. In the same year, the company also won the Australian Business Award for New Product Innovation and was included in the Anthill Smart 100 ranking for 2018. In 2019, Sinorbis received the 'Marketing Technology Company of the Year' award at the annual B&T Awards. Sinorbis was ranked in Financial Times Asia-Pacific High-Growth Companies list in 2021, 2022 and 2023.
