= 嶺南大學 =

嶺南大學 may refer to:

- Lingnan University
- Lingnan University (Guangzhou)
- Yeungnam University
