= Liang Jie =

Liang Jie is the name of:

- Liang Jie (businessman) (梁捷; born 1975), co-founder of UCWeb
- Liang Jie (actress) (梁洁; born 1994)
