= He Xiaopeng =

Chinese entrepreneur

- 何小鹏
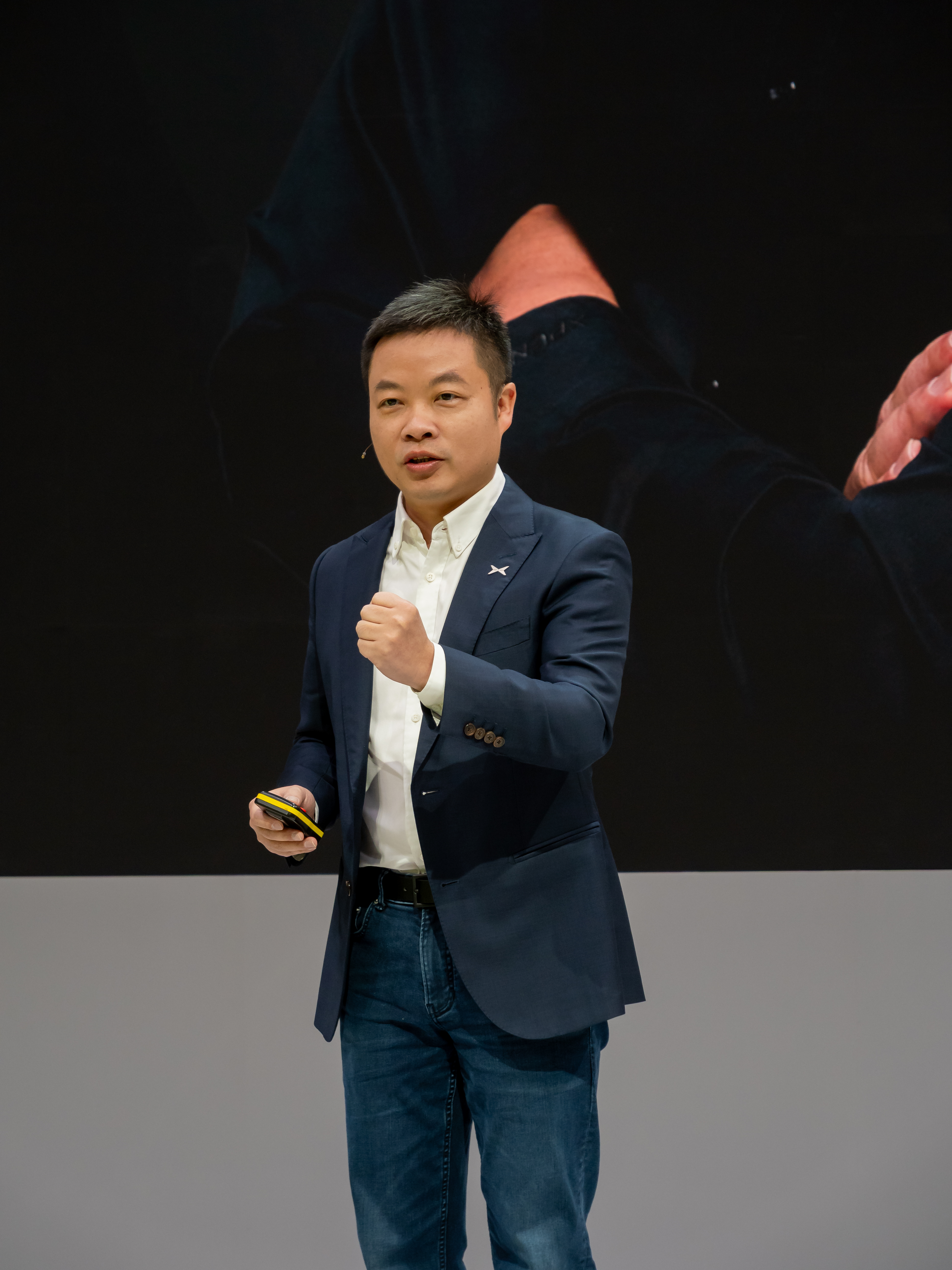
- He in 2025
- Born: 3 November 1977 (age 48); Huangshi, Hubei, China
- Education: South China University of Technology
- Occupation: Chairman of XPeng Motors
- Known for: Co-founding UCWeb and XPeng Motors

He Xiaopeng (Chinese: 何小鹏; pinyin: Hé Xiǎopéng; born 3 November 1977) is a Chinese entrepreneur, best known for co-founding companies including XPeng Motors, an intelligent electric vehicle manufacturer, and UCWeb, the Chinese mobile Internet software and service provider he co-founded in 2004. UCWeb was acquired by Alibaba Group in June 2014 in the largest merger and acquisition deal ever in the Chinese internet industry. After acquisition, he was named as president of UCWeb and president of the Alibaba Mobile Business Group, and later served as the president of Tudou & Ali Games.

On 22 August 2017, Xiaopeng left Alibaba and officially joined XPeng Motors on 29 August as chairman of the startup.

== Early life and education ==
Born in Huangshi, Hubei, where he spent his childhood. He graduated from the South China University of Technology with a bachelor's degree in computer science.

== Career ==
=== Early career ===
He worked at AsiaInfo Technologies in various roles including technology manager, testing manager and project manager after graduation in his early career.

=== UCWeb: 2004–2017 ===
He co-founded UCWeb with Liang Jie in 2004 overseeing the company product strategy and R&D efforts. In June 2014, UCWeb was acquired by e-commerce giant Alibaba Group for $4.3 billion making He Xiaopeng a billionaire. From 2014 to August 2017, Xiaopeng served as senior executive of Alibaba Mobile Business Division. On 22 August 2017, Xiaopeng officially announced his resignation from all his positions in Alibaba to start a new adventure and lead startup XPeng Motors.

=== XPeng Motors: 2017–present ===
In 2014, He Xiaopeng supported Xia Heng and He Tao in the foundation of XPeng Motors, an electric self-driving vehicle automobile company. The company received initial investments from Li Xueling, Fu Sheng, Wu Xiaoguang, Zhang Ying, and other investors to work on autonomous driving engineering and machine learning. XPeng's stated goal was to manufacture networked cars in China with capabilities like electrification, intelligence, networking and autonomous driving. In September 2016, XPeng Motors released the beta version of its prototype G3 intelligent electric mini-SUV in Beijing. The car received positive reviews for its design, performance and technology. He became full-time chairman of XPeng in August 2017.
