= Liao Mengxing =

Chinese political activist

- 廖梦醒
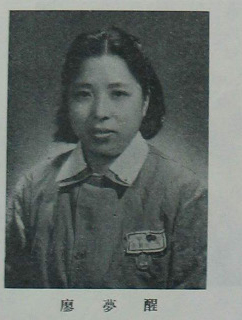
- Mengxing in 1949

Member of the National Committee of the Chinese People's Political Consultative Conference

Member of the 1st Plenary Session of the Chinese People's Political Consultative Conference

Member of the National People's Congress

Personal details
- Born: 1904 British Hong Kong
- Died: January 7, 1988 (aged 83–84) Beijing, People's Republic of China
- Party: Chinese Communist Party
- Spouse: Li Shaoshi
- Parent(s): Liao Zhongkai, He Xiangning
- Education: Lingnan University

Liao Mengxing
- Simplified Chinese: 廖梦醒
- Traditional Chinese: 廖夢醒
Transcriptions
Standard Mandarin
- Hanyu Pinyin: Liào Mèngxǐng
- Wade–Giles: Liao4 Meng4-hsing3

Liao Mengxing (1904 – January 7, 1988), also known as Liao Xianlin and Liao Shaofen, was a Chinese political activist. She was the secretary of Soong Ching-ling and was later a member of the All-China Women's Federation. She was the daughter of Liao Zhongkai and He Xiangning and the older sister of Liao Chengzhi.

== Biography ==
Liao Mengxing was born in 1904 to Liao Zhongkai and He Xiangning in Hong Kong. When she was one, she was taken to Tokyo where she was raised along with Chengzhi. She joined the Kuomintang in 1924 and started attending the Lingnan University, where she faced expulsion due to demonstrating support for the May Thirtieth Incident of 1925. Later that year, her father was assassinated, causing her mother to step away from politics for twenty years. In 1928, she went to France to study, where she was influenced by the Chinese Communist Party, causing her to gradually switch sides.

In 1930, she married Li Shaoshi, a member of the Chinese Communist Party, in Hong Kong, and in 1932, they had a daughter named Li Mei. They assumed aliases, with Mengxing going by Liang Shaofen and Shaoshi as Li Juezhen, and together they helped assure safe travel for CCP leaders in and out of Hong Kong. Amongst the people they had helped was Deng Xiaoping. When Shaoshi had been assigned propaganda work in Jiangsu Province and was made the director of the Chinese Worker's News Agency, she accompanied him to Shanghai and used the English that she had learned in Japan to help him translate English works into Chinese. However, in 1934, Shaoshi was arrested by the KMT due to his affiliation with the CCP, imprisoning him for four years. Mengxing then lived in both Hong Kong and Shanghai for two years. After his release from prison, which was after the KMT and the CCP had joined forces to fight the Japanese in the Second Sino-Japanese War, she accompanied him to Chongqing, where he was appointed as secretary to the office of the Eighth Route Army and became the private secretary to Zhou Enlai.

During the Second Sino-Japanese War, Mengxing remained in Chongqing managing the office of the China Defense League as the Chinese secretary, researching and translating information for the league's newsletter. She also acted as the private secretary to the league's leader, Soong Ching-ling. However, in 1945, Shaoshi was assassinated for an unknown reason.

After 1945, Mengxing moved back to Shanghai, continuing to work with Soong Chi-ling and the league, which had already renamed itself to the Chinese Welfare Foundation. In 1949, when both Mao Zedong and Zhou Enlai invited Soong Chi-ling to give advice, she facilitated the discussion, taking place by mail over the course of six months until Soong Chi-ling finally agreed. In Beijing, Mengxing retained her position as Soong Chi-ling's secretary as well as the position as deputy director of the International Department of the ACWF and the director of the Liao Zhongkai and He Xiangning Museum.

== Death ==
Liao Menxing died on 7 January 1988, in Beijing.
