= Varun Kumar =

Varun Kumar is the name of:

- Varun Kumar (cricketer) (born 1980), Indian cricketer
- Varun Kumar (field hockey) (born 1995), Indian field hockey player
- Varun Kumar (journalist) (born 1985), Indian journalist
