= Luo Shuzhang =

Chinese politician

- 羅叔章
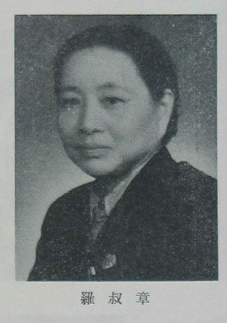
- Luo Shuzhang, photographed c. 1949

Personal details
- Born: December 21, 1899 Yueyang, Hunan, Qing Empire
- Died: January 30, 1992 (aged 92) Beijing, People's Republic of China
- Party: Chinese Communist Party (1935-1965)

Luo Shuzhang
- Traditional Chinese: 羅叔章
- Simplified Chinese: 罗叔章
Transcriptions
Standard Mandarin
- Hanyu Pinyin: Luó Shūzhāng
- IPA: [lwǒ ʂúʈʂáŋ]

Luo Shuzhang (Chinese: 羅叔章; pinyin: Luó Shūzhāng; December 21, 1899 – January 30, 1992) was a Chinese politician. Prior to joining the Chinese Communist Party in 1935, Luo was a teacher. A women's rights activist, she served as Vice Minister at several ministries from 1954 till her retirement in 1965. Luo died in Beijing aged 92.

== Early life ==
Luo Shuzhang was born on December 21, 1899, in Yueyang, Hunan, China. Her father was a doctor who practised traditional Chinese medicine; he also ran a private school which he forbade his daughter from attending. Nonetheless, a young Luo Shuzhang read widely, thanks to her mother who gave her access to classic texts as Hundred Family Surnames and the Three Character Classic. At age 15, Luo was admitted to the newly established Yueyang Girls' School and was among the many local students who protested against Yuan Shikai's plan to restore the monarchy. Luo was enrolled into Changsha First Normal School a year after being accepted to Yueyang Girls'; she graduated from Changsha in 1919 and became a teacher, first at Chu County, Anhui for three years, and then in the Dutch East Indies for six years.

== Career ==
Returning to China in 1928, Luo began studying politics and economics at the National Jinan University in Shanghai. She performed plays with progressive themes and joined the Chinese Communist Party (CCP) in 1935. During the Second Sino-Japanese War, Luo and other activists including He Xiangning and Song Qingling joined the Committee of the Shanghai Women's National Salvation Association, where they provided displaced women with shelter and taught them how to care for the soldiers. As Japan was about to conquer Shanghai, Luo fled to Wuhan where she continued her activism in partnership with Deng Yingchao. Deng, who sat on the council of the National Refugee Children's Association, appointed Luo as the director of an orphanage in Danjiangkou, Hubei. Luo personally led to safety some six hundred children who had been holed up in a temple, and had the orphanage relocated to Yunmeng County, although it was subsequently closed by the Kuomintang who accused Luo of raising "little Communists".

In 1939, Luo established the Diyi Pharmaceutical Production Cooperative in Chongqing, which gave her access to the industrial and commercial worlds. In the twilight of the war with Japan, Luo founded a new political entity, the China Democratic National Construction Association. She was one of its executive members and also had executive membership in the Chinese Women's Association. Luo never stopped campaigning for women's rights and compelling women to join the CCP; she returned to Shanghai after the war, and briefly continued her work in pharmaceuticals, before leaving for Harbin in 1946 to manage a flour mill. In 1947, Luo was reported in the American publication Huaqiao Ribao (華僑日報) as having disappeared while in Chongqing; it was later revealed that she had gone into hiding for her own safety. In 1949, Luo helped organise the All-China Democratic Women's Federation (which later became the ACWF) and was also elected secretary-general of the China Democratic National Construction Association. Luo served as Vice Minister for Labour from 1954 to 1957, Vice Minister for Food Industry (1957-1958), and Vice Minister for Light Industry (1958-1965). She also served as the deputy secretary-general of the 3rd National People's Congress in 1965.

== Final years and death ==
Luo retired from politics during the Cultural Revolution and, apart from being appointed as Honorary Vice-chairperson of the All-China Federation of Industry and Commerce in 1988, little is known about her final years. She died on January 30, 1992, in Beijing, aged 92.
