= UC News =

Chinese news outlet

UC News is a news outlet of UCWeb, which is a business within Alibaba Mobile Business Group that is a part of the main Alibaba Group, founded by Jack Ma. UC News is integrated with UC Browser.

In 2017, The Economic Times reported that Indian soldiers were instructed to remove UC News and other Chinese-owned apps from their phones because of cyber-security concerns.

It is available in seven main Languages including Hindi, Indonesian and English and 15 other Regional Indian languages like Malayalam, Marathi, Telugu, Gujarati, Bengali, Kannada, Tamil, Punjabi, Odia, Urdu, Bhojpuri, Assamese and Kashmiri etc. It is also slowly gaining popularity in India. UC News incorporates trending and latest content from social platforms and partners with traditional media as well as We-Media publishers (writers involved in a program launched by UC News) and well-known or Key Opinion Leaders to provide users with original content.

UC News provided virtually no coverage of the Sino-Indian border dispute, and the 2020 China–India skirmishes in particular, raising concerns of self-censorship of matters deemed sensitive to the Chinese government. In 2020, the National Security Council recommended that UC News and other Chinese-owned apps be blocked due to national security concerns.

In June 2020, the Government of India banned UC News along with 58 other Chinese origin apps citing data and privacy issues. The border tensions in 2020 between India and China might have also played a role in the ban.

== See also ==
- Overseas censorship of Chinese issues
