= South China University of Technology =

University in Guangdong, China

Coordinates: 23.1513°N 113.3446°E

- 华南理工大学
- Former name: South China Institute of Technology
- Motto: 博学慎思 明辨笃行
- Motto in English: Study Extensively, Enquire Accurately; Discriminate Clearly, Practise Earnestly
- Type: Public coeducational
- Established: 1918; 108 years ago
- Academic affiliations: Project 985; Double First-Class Construction; Excellence League; Guangdong-Hong Kong-Macao University Alliance (GHMUA)
- President: Hongwu Tang (2024-)
- Academic staff: 2,917 (2018)
- Undergraduates: 24,861 (full-time, 2018)
- Postgraduates: 17,144 (2018)
- Doctoral students: 3,352 (2018)
- Other students: International students: 1,829 (2018)
- Location: Wushan Campus (North Campus): 381 Wushan Rd, Tianhe District; University Town Campus (South Campus): 382 Waihuan Dong Rd, HEMC, Panyu District; Guangzhou International Campus (GZIC): 777 Xingye Dadao Xi, Panyu District, Guangzhou, Guangdong, China
- Campus: Multiple Sites
- Website: www.scut.edu.cn (in Chinese) www.scut.edu.cn/en (in English)

Chinese name
- Simplified Chinese: 华南理工大学
- Traditional Chinese: 華南理工大學
Transcriptions
Standard Mandarin
- Hanyu Pinyin: Huánán Lǐgōng Dàxué

University rankings
BCUR National	Domestic	31
Wu Shulian National	Domestic	22
CUAA National	Alumni	25
QS National	General	23
THE National	General	20–24
QS Asia (Asia version)	General	147
THE Asia (Asia version)	General	=48
ARWU World	Research	101–150
QS World	General	377
THE World	General	251–300
USNWR World	General	166

The South China University of Technology (SCUT) is a public university in Guangzhou, Guangdong, China. It is affiliated with the Ministry of Education and co-sponsored with the Guangdong Provincial People's Government. The university is part of Project 211, Project 985, and the Double First-Class Construction.

== History ==
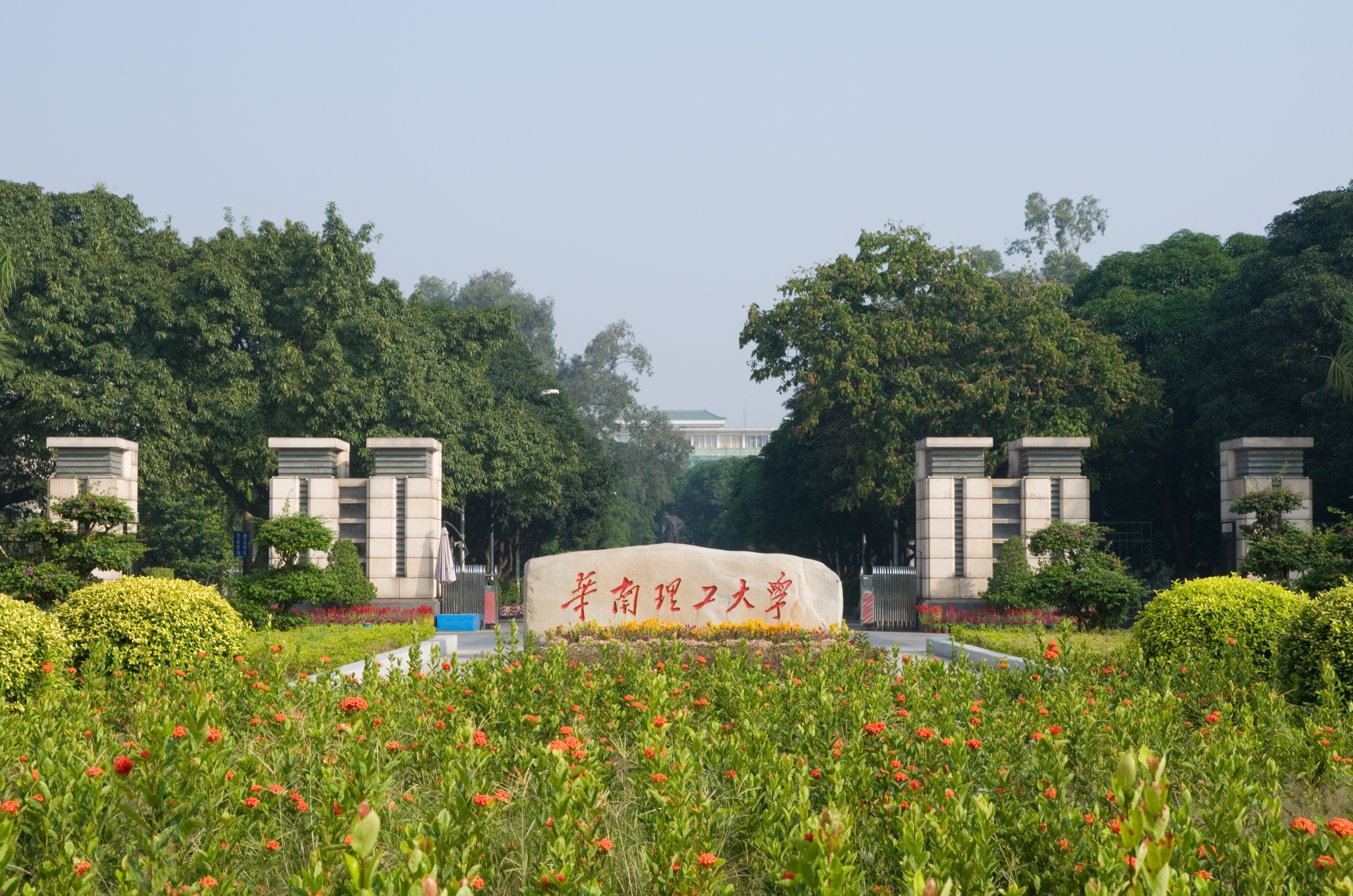
Main Gate, North Campus

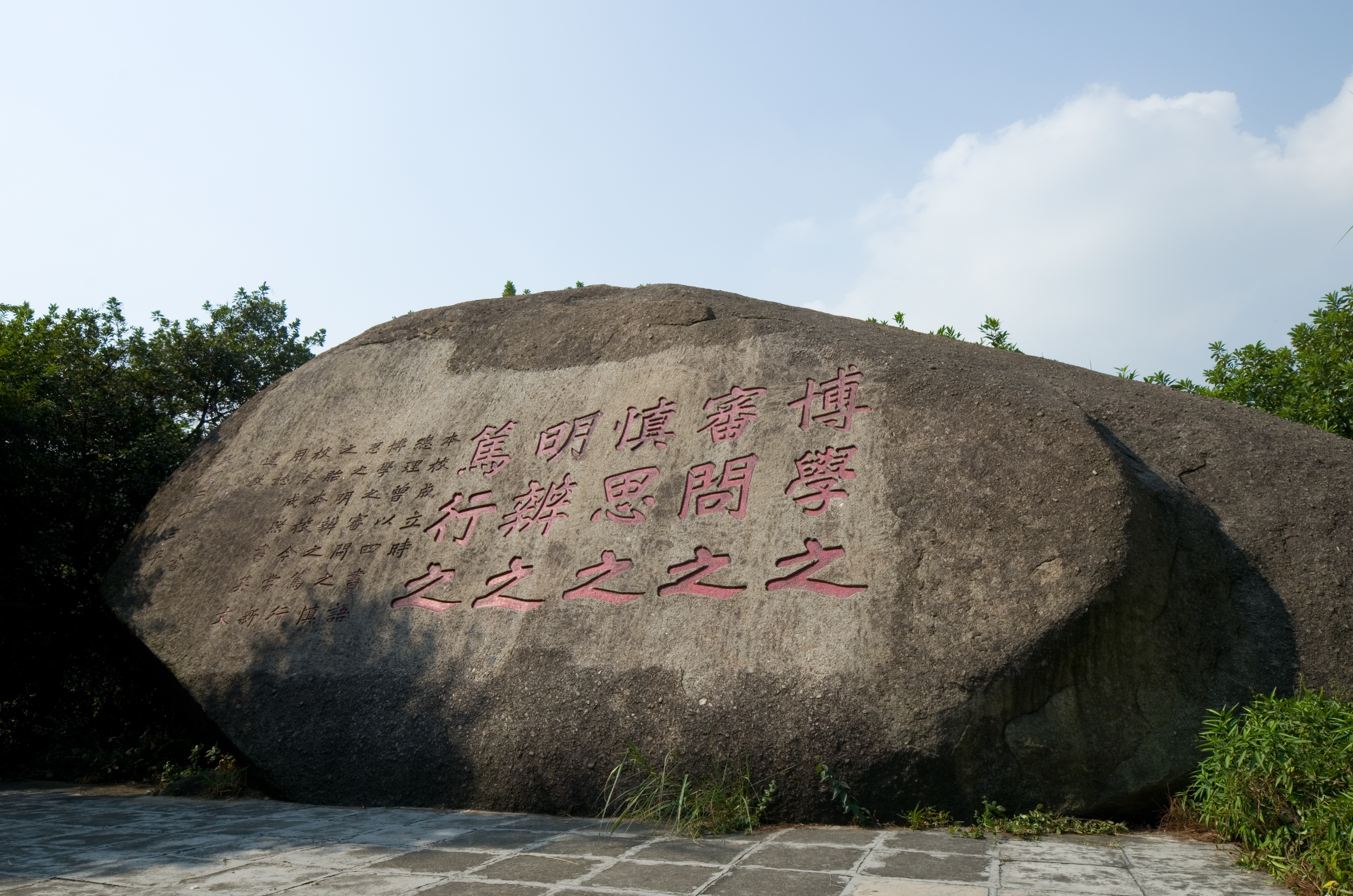
Motto stone erected when this area was part of National Sun Yat-sen University during the 1930s

- Formerly known as the South China Institute of Technology (华南工学院), it was established in 1952, through a reorganization process that unified the engineering schools and departments of major universities from five provinces in Central and Southern China, including the former National Sun Yat-sen University, Lingnan University, Hunan University, Guangxi University, South China Joint University, and four others.
- In 1960, it was selected as one of the National Key Universities, under the direct administration of the Chinese Ministry of Education.
- The university was renamed as South China University of Technology in 1988.
- In 1995, it was selected as one of the universities into which China will make a significant investment in the 21st century as part of Project 211.
- In 1999, it was rated "excellent" during the Undergraduate Teaching Assessment, and was among the first "Excellent Universities of Undergraduate Education" in the country. In the same year, a national science park was established with the authorization of the State Ministry of Technology and State Ministry of Education.
- In 2000, authorization was given for the establishment of a Graduate School.
- In 2001, it became one of the 39 national universities sponsored by Project 985.
- In 2017, it became one of the 36 Class A Double First-Class Universities.

== Rankings and reputation ==
- In the 2013 Leiden Ranking of universities according to the proportion of their scientific publications that rank among the top 10% in their field, SCUT was ranked 138th in the world, 11th in Asia, and 5th in China (excluding Hong Kong) behind Nankai University, Hunan University, University of Science and Technology of China, and Lanzhou University.
- As of 2023, QS World University Rankings placed the university at # 392 in the world.
- The university ranked 401-500th according to the 2012 Academic Ranking of World Universities (ARWU).
- The university ranked 301-400th according to the 2014 Academic Ranking of World Universities (ARWU). In 2015, its engineering/technology and computer science was ranked 48th, and its mathematics and chemistry were ranked 151-200th and 101-150th respectively among world universities.
- The university ranked 200-300th according to the 2016 Academic Ranking of World Universities (ARWU).
- The university ranked 151-200th according to the 2020 Academic Ranking of World Universities (ARWU).
- The university ranked 101-150th according to the 2023 Academic Ranking of World Universities (ARWU).
- The university ranked 448th according to the 2015 U.S. News & World Report Best Global Universities.
- The university ranked 394th according to the 2017 U.S. News & World Report Best Global Universities.
- The university ranked 219th according to the 2023 U.S. News & World Report Best Global Universities.

== Alumni ==
=== Politicians and military ===
- Cheng Siwei – Vice Chairman of The National People's Congress
- Wan Qingliang – Former mayor and CCP secretary of Guangzhou City
- Lin Shusen – Former Governor and Deputy Communist Party Chief of Guizhou Province

=== Athletes ===
- Chen Ding – 2012 Summer Olympics gold medallist in the 20 kilometres walk

=== Academics ===
- He Jingtang – Dean of School of Architecture of SCUT, Member of China Academy of Engineering and the main designer of the acclaimed China Pavilion at the 2010 Shanghai World Expo.
- Thomas Hou – Charles Lee Powell Professor of Applied and Computational Mathematics at the California Institute of Technology
- Rong Baisheng, architect and civil engineer

=== Businesspeople ===
- Yao Zhenhua – Founder of Baoneng Group
- Li Dongsheng – CEO of TCL Corporation
- Zhang Zhidong – Former CTO of Tencent
- He Xiaopeng – Co-founder and president of UCWeb Inc.
- Robin Zeng – Founder and president of CATL
