= Rong Baisheng =

Chinese architect and civil engineer (1930–2019)

- 容柏生
- Born: 27 August 1930; Guangzhou, China
- Died: 11 May 2019 (aged 88); Guangzhou, China
- Education: South China Institute of Technology
- Occupations: Architect, Civil Engineer
- Works: Shenzhen Shangri-La Hotel (1981); Guangdong International Building (1985)

Rong Baisheng (Chinese: 容柏生; 27 August 1930 – 11 May 2019) was a Chinese architect and civil engineer. A pioneer in skyscraper design and construction in China, he was elected an academician of the Chinese Academy of Engineering in 1995. His works include the Guangdong International Building, which was China's tallest building when completed in 1990, and the Shenzhen Shangri-La Hotel (1981).

== Early life and education ==
Rong was born on 27 August 1930 in Guangzhou, Guangdong, Republic of China, with his ancestral home in Nanping, Zhuhai. His father was in the military, and the family became refugees during the Second Sino-Japanese War. He was frequently on the run with his mother and siblings to evade Japanese occupation.

After the surrender of Japan in 1945, Rong returned to Guangzhou and resumed his education. In September 1949, he entered the Civil Engineering Department of Lingnan University (Guangzhou). In 1952, when the Communist government reorganized China's higher education according to the Soviet model, Lingnan's engineering departments became part of the newly established South China Institute of Technology (now South China University of Technology), and Rong was a member of the first class that graduated from the university in July 1953.

== Career ==
Upon graduation from university, Rong worked at the Guangdong Provincial Architectural Design and Research Institute from 1953 to 1958. From January 1958 to January 1972, he taught for 14 years at the Guangdong Provincial Architecture and Engineering School. He returned to the Guangdong Provincial Architectural Design and Research Institute in 1972. After working for decades at the state-owned company, he started his own firm, RBS Architectural Engineering Design Associates, in January 2003.

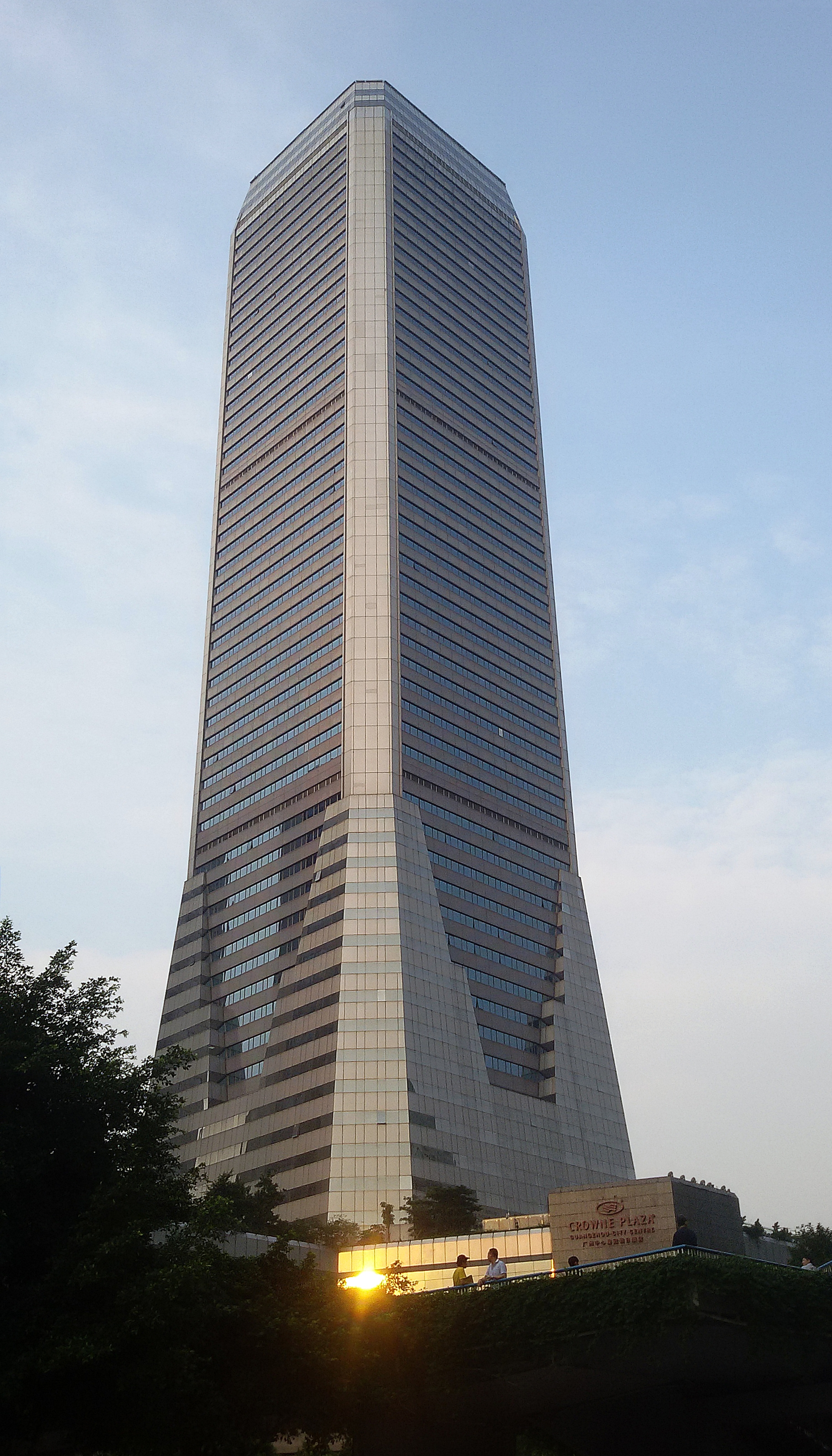
Guangdong International Building, designed in 1985, completed in 1990

In the 1970s, Rong began researching the structural design of skyscrapers, and devised a complete system of methodology and computer programs. With the commencement of the reform and opening era, Rong's career prospered in the 1980s. He designed the Shenzhen Asia Hotel (now Shangri-La Hotel) in 1981. The 33-story building was a landmark of Shenzhen at the time, and won a Science and Technology Progress Award from the Ministry of Construction of China.

In 1985, Rong designed the 200-meter, 63-story Guangdong International Building using innovative designs and technologies. When completed in 1990, it was the tallest building in China and the first 200-meter skyscraper in the country. It won a National Design Gold Medal, the Zhan Tianyou Civil Engineering Award, and the State Science and Technology Progress Award (Second Class). Recognized as a pioneer in skyscraper design and construction in China, Rong was elected an academician of the Chinese Academy of Engineering in 1995.

== Personal life ==
Rong died in Guangzhou, China on 11 May 2019, at the age of 88.
