= Chung Wing Kwong =

Chinese scholar and revolutionist

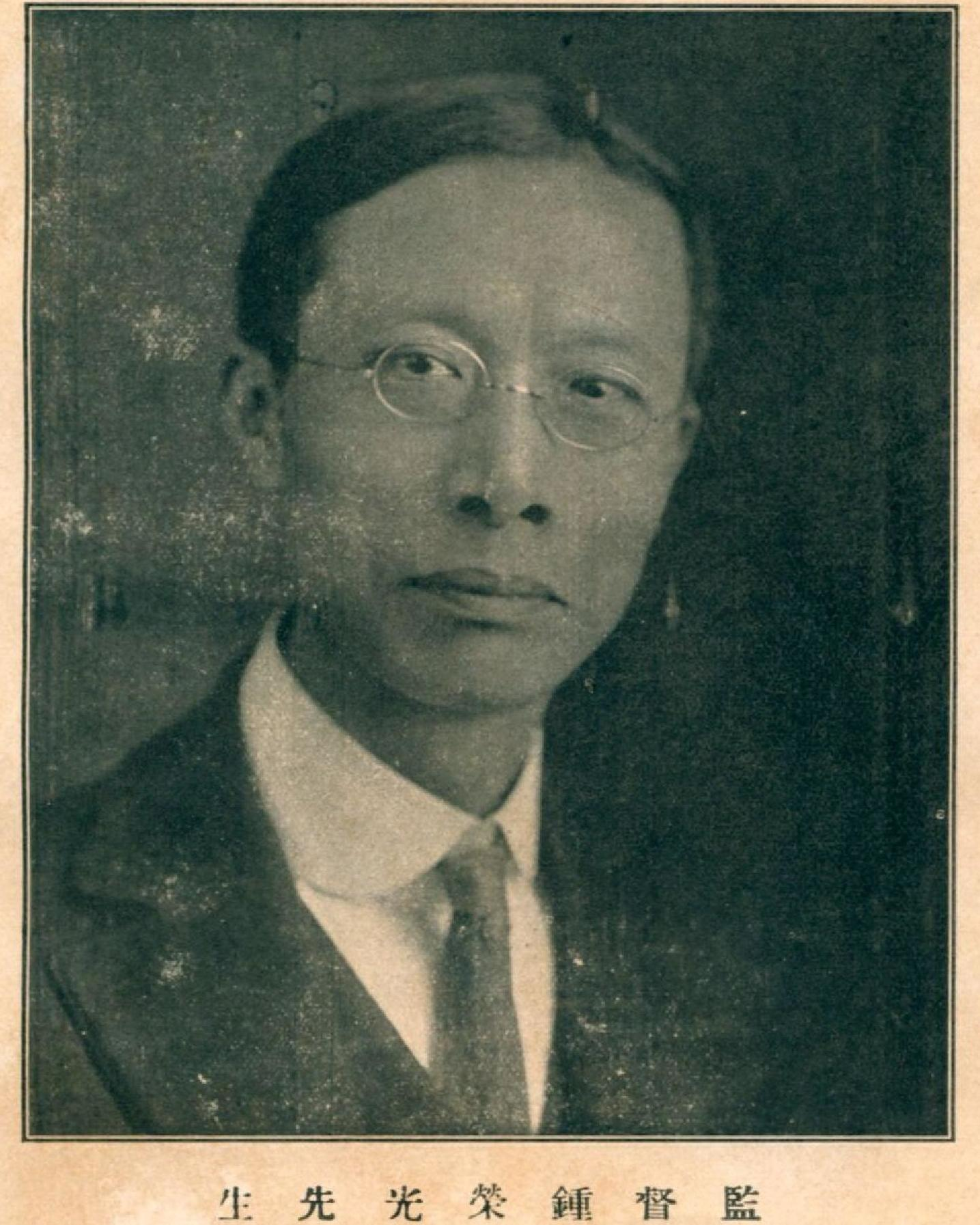
Chung Wing Kwong: Lingnan University Yearbook 1925 (page 8 crop)

Chung Wing Kwong (鍾榮光, 1866–1942) was a scholar and revolutionist in China. He devoted most of his life in Lingnan University, being the first Chinese principal of the university, and revolution of China.

== Life ==
He was born in Siu Lam of Heung Shan, Kwungtung, China, in 1866 and lived in Hong Kong when he was young.

== See also ==
- Lingnan Dr. Chung Wing Kwong Memorial Secondary School
