= Guangdong International Building =

Skyscraper in Guangzhou, China

- 广东国际大厦
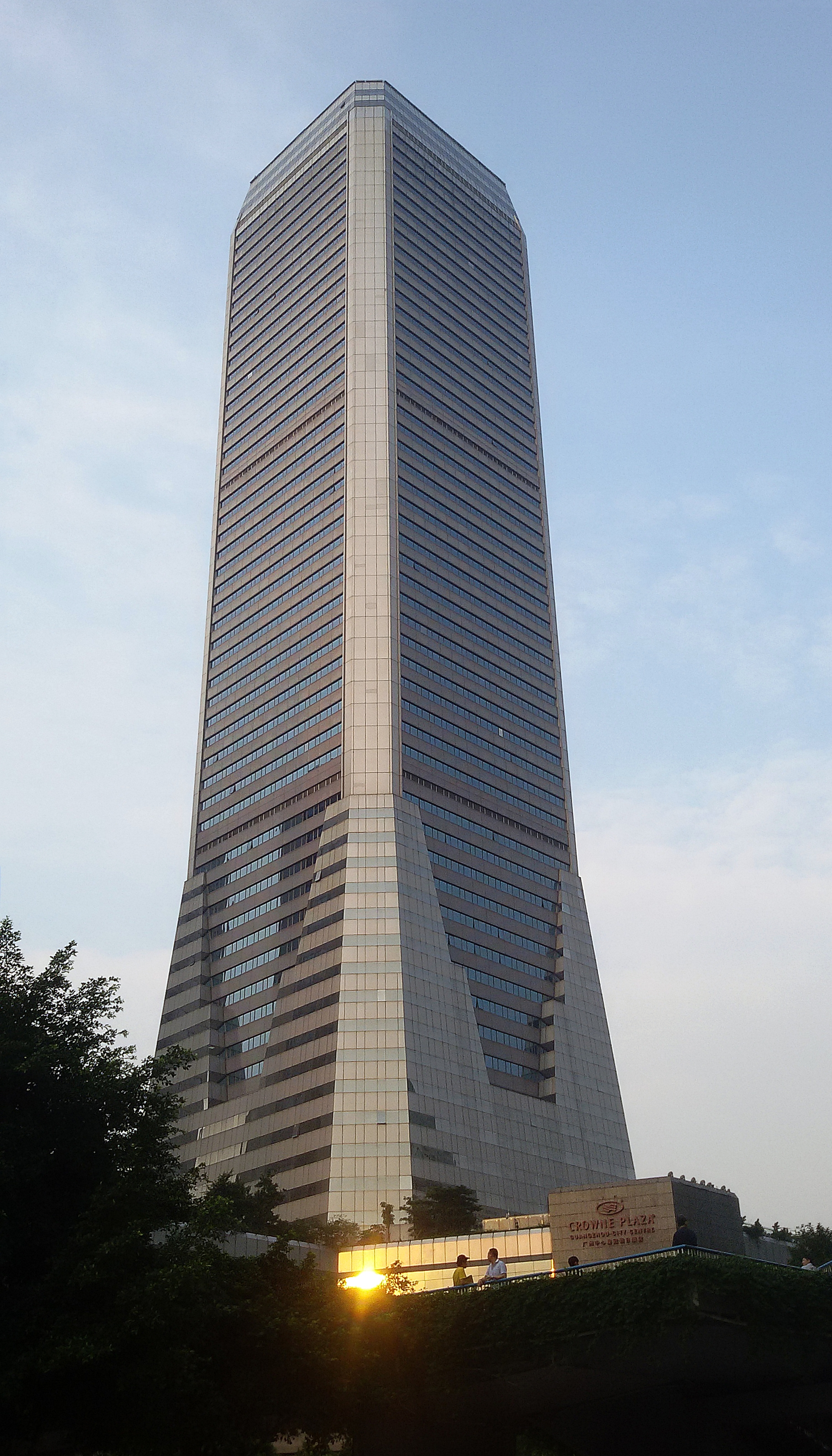
- Guangdong International Building
- Alternative names: GITIC Plaza Hotel; Guangdong International Hotel

General information
- Status: Completed
- Type: hotel Commercial offices
- Architectural style: Modernism
- Location: 339 Huanshi Road East; Guangzhou, China
- Coordinates: 23°08′28″N 113°16′39″E
- Construction started: 1985
- Completed: 1990

Height
- Roof: 200 m (660 ft)

Technical details
- Floor count: 63; 3 below ground
- Floor area: 150,000 m^{2} (1,600,000 sq ft)

Design and construction
- Architects: Rong Baisheng, Guangdong Provincial Architectural Design & Research Institute

The Guangdong International Building or Guangdong International Hotel is a 63-storey, 200 m (660 ft) skyscraper in Guangzhou, China. The tower was designed by Rong Baisheng of the Guangdong Provincial Architectural Design and Research Institute in 1985. When completed in 1990, it was the first 200-metre skyscraper in Guangzhou, and one of the tallest buildings in China.

== See also ==
- List of tallest buildings in Guangzhou
