= He Xiangning =

Chinese woman politician and artist (1878–1972)

- 何香凝
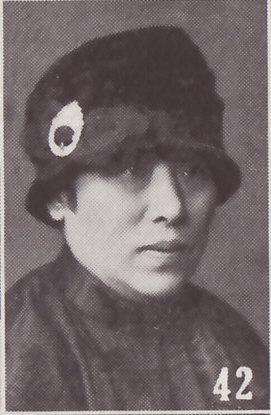
- He Xiangning as pictured in The Most Recent Biographies of Chinese Dignitaries

Vice Chairwoman of the Standing Committee of the National People's Congress
- In office 27 April 1959 – 1 September 1972
- Chairman: Zhu De

Vice Chairwoman of the Chinese People's Political Consultative Conference
- In office 25 December 1954 – 5 January 1965
- Chairman: Zhou Enlai

Vice Chairperson of the National People's Congress
- In office April 1959 – 1 September 1972
- Chairman: Zhu De

Chairwoman of Revolutionary Committee of the Chinese Kuomintang
- In office August 1960 – 1 September 1972
- Preceded by: Li Jishen
- Succeeded by: Zhu Yunshan

Personal details
- Born: 27 June 1878 British Hong Kong
- Died: 1 September 1972 (aged 94) Beijing
- Party: Revolutionary Committee of the Chinese Kuomintang
- Spouse: Liao Zhongkai
- Children: Liao Chengzhi

He Xiangning
- Chinese: 何香凝
Transcriptions
Standard Mandarin
- Hanyu Pinyin: Hé Xiāngníng
- Wade–Giles: Ho2 Hsiang1-ning2

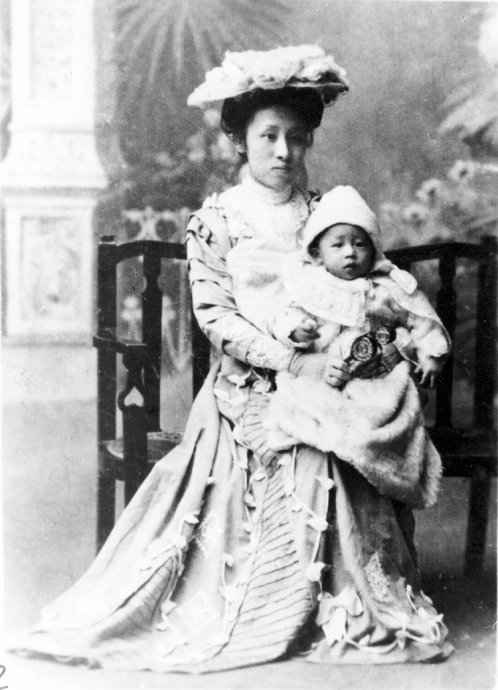
He Xiangning in 1909, holding her son Liao Chengzhi

He Xiangning (Chinese: 何香凝; Wade–Giles: Ho Hsiang-ning; 27 June 1878 – 1 September 1972) was a Chinese revolutionary, feminist, politician, painter, and poet. Together with her husband Liao Zhongkai, she was one of the earliest members of Sun Yat-sen's revolutionary movement Tongmenghui. As Minister for Women's Affairs in Sun's Nationalist government in Guangzhou (Canton), she advocated equal rights for women and organized China's first rally for International Women's Day in 1924. After her husband's assassination in 1925 and Chiang Kai-shek's persecution of the Communists in 1927, she stayed away from party politics for two decades, but actively worked to organize resistance against the Japanese invasion of China.

In 1948, she cofounded the Revolutionary Committee of the Chinese Kuomintang. She served in many high-ranking positions after the foundation of the People's Republic of China, including Vice Chairwoman of the CPPCC (1954–64), Vice Chairwoman of the National People's Congress (1959–72), Chairwoman of the Revolutionary Committee of the Chinese Kuomintang (1960–72), and Honorary Chairwoman of the All-China Women's Federation.

He Xiangning was a renowned painter of the Lingnan School of Chinese art and served as Chairwoman of the China Artists Association in the 1960s. The National He Xiangning Art Museum was opened in Shenzhen in 1997, and her paintings have been featured on Chinese stamps.

== Early life ==
On 27 June 1878, He Xiangning was born as He Jian (何諫, also He Ruijian 何瑞諫), into a wealthy family in Hong Kong. Her father, He Binghuan (何炳桓), originally from Nanhai, Guangdong Province, started a successful business trading tea and investing in real estate. She persuaded her father to allow her to be educated together with her brothers, and was a diligent student from a young age.

A determined feminist since she was young, He Xiangning fiercely resisted her father's order to have her feet bound per traditional Chinese custom. Because of her "big feet", in October 1897 she was arranged to marry Liao Zhongkai, an American-born Chinese who did not want a wife with bound feet. Although it was an arranged marriage, He and Liao had much in common, sharing a love for knowledge and art, and a passion for China's salvation. She financially supported her husband's desire to study in Japan, using her personal savings and selling her jewelry to raise 3,000 silver dollars. Liao went to Japan in November 1902, and she followed two months later. She studied at the prep school for Tokyo Women's Normal School.

== Revolution ==
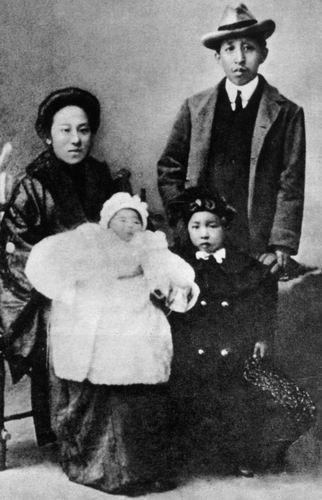
He Xiangning with Liao Zhongkai and their children

While in Tokyo, He and Liao met the Chinese revolutionary Sun Yat-sen in 1903. They became two of the earliest members of Sun's anti-Qing revolutionary movement Tongmenghui, and Huang Xing taught them to use guns in preparation for revolution. She rented a house as a front for Tongmenghui's secret operations.

After returning to Hong Kong to give birth to her daughter, Liao Mengxing, she left the girl with her family, and went back to Tokyo. She studied painting at Tokyo Women's Arts School with the imperial artist Tanaka Raishō, and assisted in Tongmenghui's propaganda work, including designing and sewing revolutionary flags and emblems. In 1908, she gave birth to her son, Liao Chengzhi.

She and Liao Zhongkai went back to Hong Kong in 1911, the year of the Xinhai Revolution. She met Soong Ching-ling, Sun Yat-sen's future wife, in 1913. They followed Sun's lead in revolting against General Yuan Shikai who had betrayed the revolution, but were forced to return to Japan as exiles in 1914.

== Sun Yat-sen government ==
In 1916, He Xiangning and her husband moved to Shanghai to advance the revolutionary cause. In 1921, Sun Yat-sen established his revolutionary government in Guangdong, and appointed Liao as his finance minister. He Xiangning persuaded the commanders of seven naval warships to join Sun's government. In Guangzhou, she and Soong Ching-ling organized a women's association to raise funds and provide medicine and clothing for the soldiers. She also sold many of her paintings for the war effort. When General Chen Jiongming rebelled against Sun in 1922, He Xiangning arranged for Sun's reunion with his wife, and took great risk to win the release of her husband, who had been held by the rebels.

In August 1923, she was appointed a member of the Kuomintang (KMT) Central Executive Committee, and Minister for Women's Affairs in Sun's government. She proposed the "complete equality of women with regard to legal, social, economic, and educational rights", and organized China's first rally for International Women's Day on 8 March 1924. She also opened hospitals and schools for women in Guangzhou.

== Assassination of Liao Zhongkai and wartime career ==
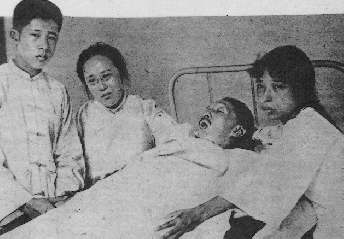
He Xiangning and children beside Liao Zhongkai's body, 1925

After Sun Yat-sen died in March 1925, the left and right wings of the KMT competed for the party leadership. Liao Zhongkai, the leader of the left wing, was assassinated in Guangzhou in August. He Xiangning was beside him at the time, her clothes soaked with his blood.

Chiang Kai-shek eventually emerged as the party's new leader, and launched the Northern Expedition against the northern warlords. In support of the Expedition, He Xiangning organized Red Cross units composed of working-class women and brought them to Wuhan. However, when Chiang's KMT turned against the Communists in 1927, many of these women were killed. Following the setback, she largely stayed away from party politics for the next 20 years. She moved to Hong Kong and Singapore, and travelled extensively in Europe, exhibiting her paintings in London, Paris, Belgium, Germany, and Switzerland.

She returned to Shanghai after the Mukden Incident and the ensuing Japanese invasion of Manchuria in 1931, and organized the National Salvation Association with Shen Junru to advocate resistance against Japanese aggression. She also partnered with prominent activists as Soong Ching-Ling and Luo Shuzhang to specifically train women to support soldiers. She was forced to flee Shanghai after it fell to the Japanese in 1937, and Hong Kong after that city's fall in 1941. She spent several years in Guilin during the remainder of the Second Sino-Japanese War. Along with Song Qingling, she promoted civil liberties and openly clashed with the Nationalist Government over its treatment of political prisoners.

== People's Republic of China ==
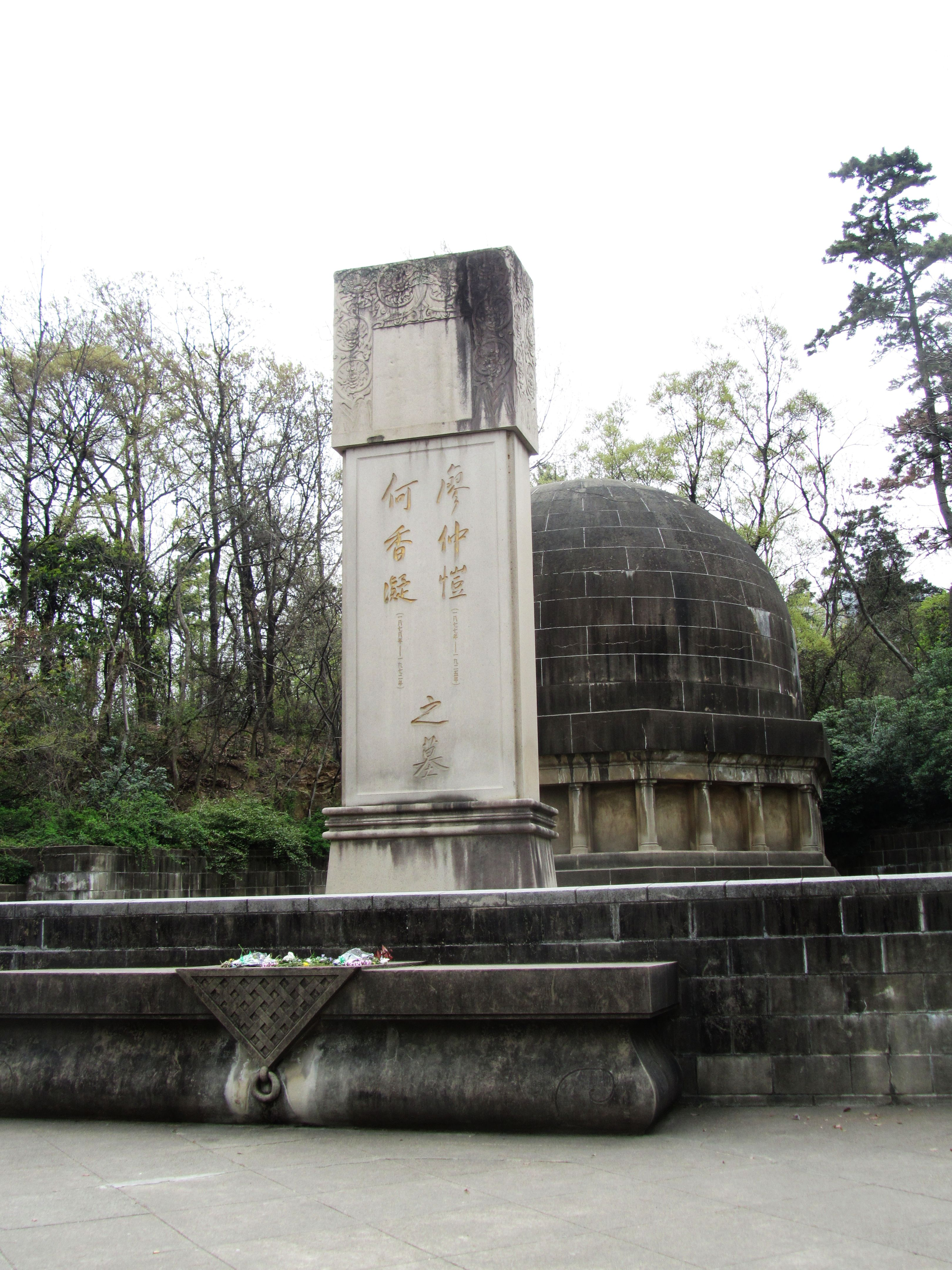
Tomb of Liao Zhongkai and He Xiangning in Nanjing

In 1948, during the Chinese Civil War, He Xiangning, Li Jishen, and other KMT members who opposed Chiang Kai-shek's leadership founded the Revolutionary Committee of the Chinese Kuomintang (Minge). After the Communists won the Civil War and established the People's Republic of China in 1949, she moved to Beijing and served in a number of high-ranking positions in the Communist government, including Vice Chairperson of the CPPCC (1954–64), Vice Chairperson of the Standing Committee of the National People's Congress (1959–72), Chairwoman of the Minge (1960–72), Chairwoman of the Overseas Affairs Committee, and Honorary Chairwoman of the All-China Women's Federation.

He Xiangning kept working until she turned 80 in 1959, and continued to hold many official positions afterwards. On 1 September 1972, she died of pneumonia at the age of 94. She was buried in the Liao Zhongkai Mausoleum in Nanjing, alongside her husband.

== Art ==
A renowned painter of the Lingnan School of Chinese art, He Xiangning was elected the third chairperson of the China Artists Association in July 1960. She particularly enjoyed painting plum blossoms, pine trees, tigers, and lions. A collection of her paintings was published in 1979 in Guangdong. On 18 April 1997, He Xiangning Art Museum was opened in Shenzhen. It was China's first national-level art museum named after an individual artist, and Communist Party general secretary Jiang Zemin wrote the calligraphy for the museum's name. In June 1998, China Post issued a set of three stamps (1998-15T) featuring her paintings.

== Family ==
He Xiangning and Liao Zhongkai had two children. Their daughter, Liao Mengxing, was a well-known translator who was proficient in Japanese, English, and French. Their son, Liao Chengzhi, served as a Politburo member, Vice Chairperson of the National People's Congress, and was designated to be China's vice president before his sudden death in 1983. Liao Chengzhi's son, Liao Hui, was Director of the Hong Kong and Macau Affairs Office and Vice Chairman of the CPPCC (The Chinese People's Political Consultative Conference).
