= Coral Wong =

Chinese physician and missionary

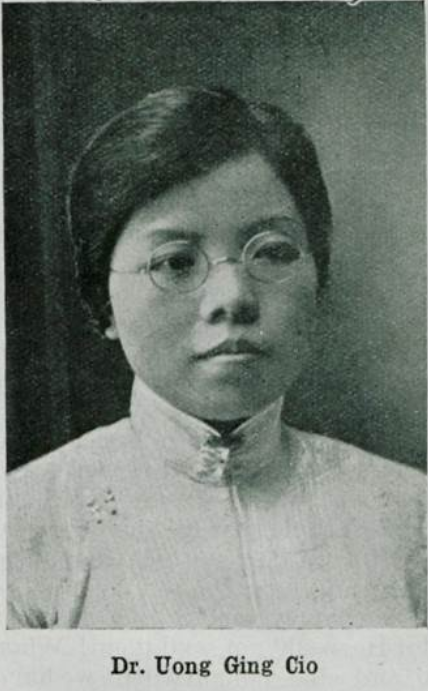
- Coral Wong under the name Dr. Uong Ging Cio
- Born: c. 1896 near Ningde, China
- Died: Unknown
- Title: Coral Wong

Coral Wong (1896–unknown), most commonly known as Coral Yuan or Uong Ging Cio, was the medical superintendent of the Ningteh Hospital for the Church Missionary Society (CMS). Wong was one of the first females to be trained as a doctor by the CMS in China at the Hackett Medical College for Women. During her time at the Ningteh hospital, Wong pursued both medical and missionary work, built the maternity wing, and built accommodations for female staff, and engaged in evangelistic activities while fulfilling her duties as a physician.

== Early life ==
Not much is known about Wong's early life. She was born sometime in 1896. It has been said that she was born not far from Ningteh, China. While growing up in Ningteh, she attended the CMS Girls' School in the area. When she was engaged to her fiancé, she was living with her father-in-law. However, both her fiancé and her father-in-law, who was a CMS catechist, passed away during her last year at the CMS Girls' School in 1914. Afterwards, Dr. Wong was taken care of by the principal of her school, Miss Clarke at the request of her father-in-law. Miss Clarke decided that Wong would train to become a doctor.

== Education ==
Before going to medical school, it was decided that Wong would take a preparatory year at a boarding school in Foochow, China. During the autumn term of 1916, Wong attended the U.S.A Presbyterian Mission College (specifically Hackett Women's Medical College) in Canton, China to become a doctor. By 1921, she had graduated medical school.

Wong pursued post-graduate studies twice. She first continued her studies in Peking, China in 1926 returning to Ningteh in 1927. She then took post-graduate classes in England in 1933 returning to Ningteh in 1934.

== Missionary work ==
=== Before Ningteh Hospital ===
Wong was engaging in religious missionary work even before her service to Ningteh Hospital. During her second year of medical school, she helped convert two people into becoming Christians through what she described as the "personal work for the un-Christians." After graduating from medical school in 1921, Wong worked at the mission hospital affiliated with her school as an intern until 1923.

=== Working at Ningteh Hospital for the CMS ===
Wong returned to Ningteh to work at the hospital for the CMS in 1923 as a doctor. In 1926 Wong's role was succeeded by Dr. Mary Wong during a temporary leave to pursue her post-graduate studies in Peking, China.

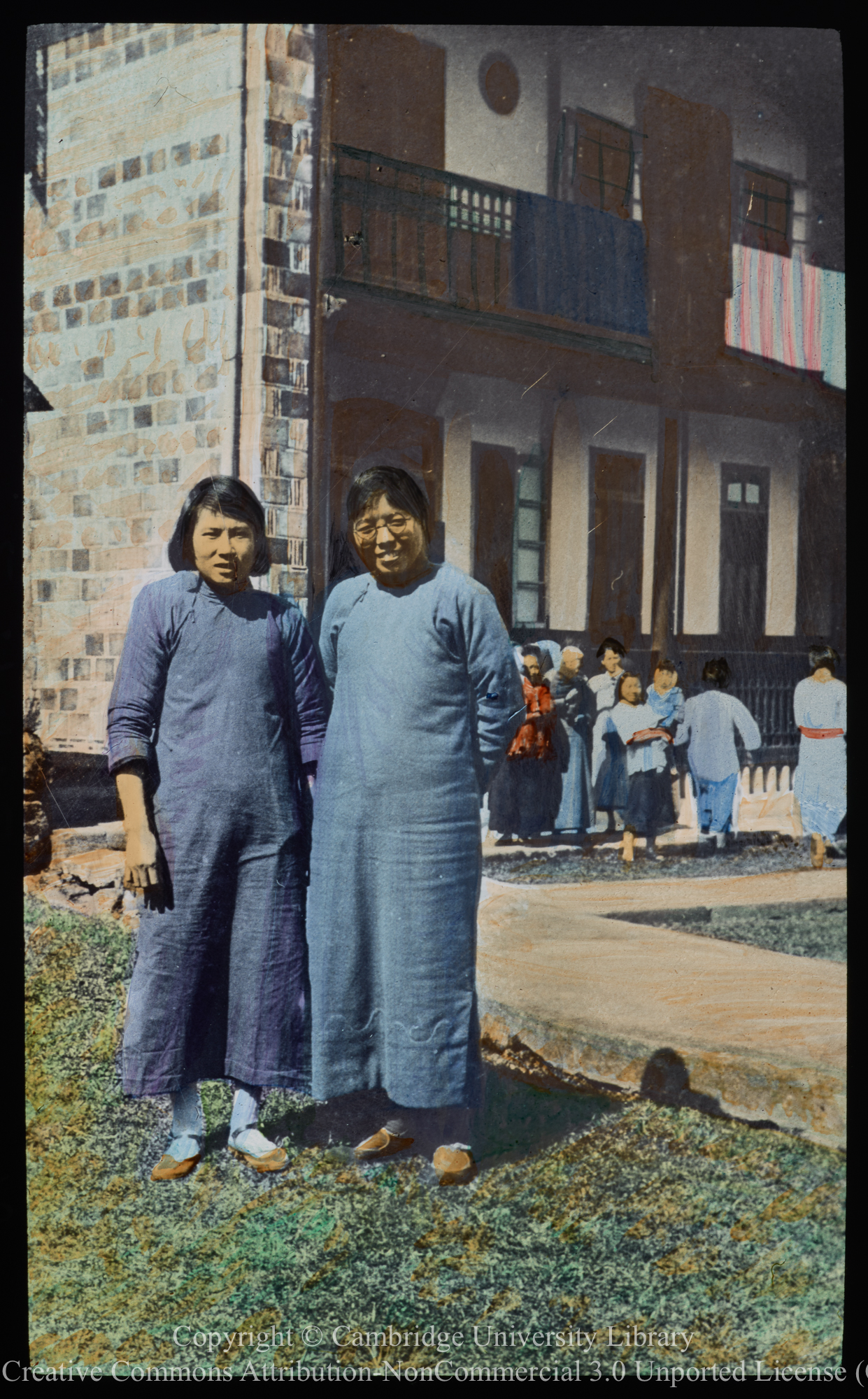
Dr Coral Yuan with head nurse at Ningteh Hospital, 1900 - 1920

While providing medical care, Wong often held bible classes for the staff and supervised the teachings given in the wards by the nurses. Wong often found opportunities to provide religious teachings to her patients while doing her clinical rounds.

By the time Wong returned to Ningteh in 1927, the number of patients at the hospital had doubled. The hospital desperately needed more nurses, but was short on funds to be able to hire more. Wong also did not have a proper housing for herself, as she was living in the woman's school with both the Matron and the "Bible woman."

During her time supervising the Ningteh Hospital, Wong often recognized what the hospital needed. For example, she recognized that the hospital needed to have accommodations for males when they started treating them as in-patients. In response to the need for female staff housing, Wong secured funds and built the accommodations building 1932. She also recognized the need to separate maternity care from primary care. In 1933 she opened a maternity care ward. Wong was receptive to the demands that the hospital needed to meet, and ultimately saw them met.

While working as a physician, Wong was best known for her excellent work in surgery, she also often treated tuberculosis, venereal disease, malaria, and helminthiasis. She treated malaria especially during the malaria epidemic in Ningteh during 1939.

Throughout most of her career, Wong was solely in charge of Ningteh Hospital, overseeing the clinical care and nursing staff who helped her provide medical treatment. Despite being the only doctor on duty for most of her career, she fulfilled her duties faithfully. This was highlighted by how she and her staff had "won the confidence and friendship" of the people in Ningteh and the surrounding villages.

=== Departure from Ningteh Hospital and CMS ===
In November 1948, Wong's retirement was announced. However, she had resigned from Ningteh Hospital prior to this announcement date. Although she was met with wishes for her happiness and praise for her 26 years of faithful service, it is unclear why she resigned.

At first, it was believed that Wong resigned because she had been rebaptized with the "Little Flock." However, this was disputed by Miss Crabbe, who thought Wong would not have done this because she was a leader and a "keen evangelist." However, Miss Crabbe also wrote about how Wong left CMS because she was influenced by a Sectarian Church. She thought that Wong kept her changing churches a secret because of the administrative position she had at Ningteh Hospital. Crabbe ultimately believed that Wong resigned from her position at Ningteh Hospital because she was burnt out.

== Legacy ==
Wong's death is currently unknown. Much of her life after her involvement with the CMS and Ningteh Hospital is unknown. What is known is that she wanted to engage in both medical and evangelistic work around Ningteh and that she lived to be at least 53. Despite this, the impact Wong left on Ningteh Hospital and Ningteh, China was profound. Wong became one of the first women from Mary Fulton's CMS Girls' School to receive medical training. From her work in Ningteh Hospital, she helped further maternity health in China by advocating for the separation of maternity work and primary care work and had women's accommodations built for the clinical staff. As a religious missionary, Wong influenced many people to become believers of Christianity. Wong's devoutness to both her faith and occupation ultimately propelled her career, leaving her to be well-liked by many during her time with the CMS despite how her resignation unfolded.
