= Varun Kumar (journalist) =

Indian journalist

- Occupations: Journalist, writer, blogger
- Years active: 2003–present
- Employer: UC News
- Organization: Alibaba Group
- Known for: Journalism

Varun Kumar is an Indian journalist. Kumar was manager of Alibaba Group's UC News company. Later, he joined ABP News, Living Media, and now TV9 Bharatvarsh.

== Career ==
Varun Kumar started his journalism career in 2003. By 2007, he was working as a television journalist. As a television journalist, Kumar worked for 3 years; after this period of his career, he started working for STAR News. Apart from this, he also wrote articles in ABP News. After this, he continued his work after 4 years on 1 January 2014 for the national newspaper Amar Ujala. Kumar left the job from Amar Ujala a year later and started to work for the Hindustan Times. Varun Kumar worked for the Hindustan Times from 5 January 2015 to February 2017, and after that he joined Alibaba Group's UC News. Varun is currently working as a manager at UC News.

== Achievements ==
Varun Kumar has been involved in journalism since 2003; for this reason he was given the national media award in Delhi on the occasion of the 2017 Teacher's Day. All of the members of Varun Kumar's family are also linked to journalism. Apart from this, Varun Kumar was also honored with the First Inspiration Inspire Aspire India Award in May 2017.
