= Japanese China =

Japanese China may refer to:

- Taiwan under Japanese rule (1895–1945)
- Manchukuo, a puppet state in Northeast China and Inner Mongolia (1932–45)
- Reorganized National Government of the Republic of China, a collaborationist government in the Republic of China (1940–45)

== See also ==
- Sino-Japanese (disambiguation)
- Japanese pottery and porcelain
