= Sino-Japanese Journalist Exchange Agreement =

China-Japan agreement, from 1964

Chinese name
- Simplified Chinese: 互换记者的会谈纪要
- Traditional Chinese: 互換記者的會談紀要
Transcriptions
Standard Mandarin
- Hanyu Pinyin: Hùhuàn Jìzhě de Huìtán Jìyào

Japanese name
- Kanji: 日中記者交換協定

The Sino-Japanese Journalist Exchange Agreement is a term that collectively refers to several agreements for a journalist exchange between China and Japan.

== 1964 Memorandum of Agreement ==
Liao Chengzhi (廖承志, a son of Liao Zhongkai), the president of the Sino-Japanese Friendship Society, and Tatsunosuke Takasaki (高碕達之助), a Japanese politician, worked together on the LT Trade Agreement, (Chinese: 发展民间贸易备忘录 or LT贸易, Japanese: 日中総合貿易に関する覚書). Both sides signed the memorandum regarding trade on November 9, 1962. The members of both the Liao Chengzhi Office and the Tatsunosuke Takasaki Office held a meeting regarding journalism between China and Japan. The delegates for the meeting were Liao and Japanese Diet member Kenzō Matsumura (松村謙三).

On April 19, 1964, both countries reached a consensus for the establishment of a trade liaison office and the exchange of journalists.

Attendees of this meeting were:

- For China - Liao Chengzhi (廖承志), Sun Pinghua (孫平化), Wang Xiaoyun (王暁雲).
- For Japan - Kenzō Matsumura (松村謙三), Yutaro Takeyama (竹山祐太郎), Kaheita Okazaki (岡崎嘉平太), Yoshimi Hurui (古井喜実), Tadaharu Okubo (大久保任晴).

The memorandum of the meeting regarding journalist exchange was as follows:

1. Based on the results of the meeting between Liao Chengzhi and Kenzō Matsumura, both China and Japan created the exchange of journalists.

2. Matters pertaining to the journalist exchange, including entry formalities, will be communicated and processed via the Liao Chengzhi Office and the Tatsunosuke Takasaki Office.

3. The number of journalists exchanged will be up to eight (8) persons from each country. Each newspaper company, press news agency, broadcasting network, and television network will provide one journalist. If necessary, depending on the situation, both parties can modify the number of journalists.

4. The first exchange of newspaper journalists will be achieved by the end of June 1964.

5. Both parties will send journalists at the same time.

6. The duration of the journalists' one time stay in the counterpart country will be up to a year.

7. Both parties will insure the safety of the other country's journalists.

8. Both parties will offer facilities for news gathering activities for the other country's journalists.

9. Journalists of both countries will abide by the administrative provisions for foreign journalists in the resident country, receiving fair treatment that each country gives foreign journalists.

10. Both parties will guarantee the freedom of communication of the other country's journalists.

11. If either country encounters any problem in the implementation of this agreement, the Liao Chengzhi Office and the Tatsunosuke Takasaki Office will jointly resolve the problem.

12. The memorandum of this meeting will be made available in Chinese and in Japanese, and the documents will be equivalent in effect. The Liao Chengzhi Office and the Tatsunosuke Takasaki Office will keep copies of the memorandum in both languages on hand.

Appendix:
The five basic principles regarding friendship, on which Zhou Enlai and Kenzō Matsumura reached a consensus previously, will be ascertained in the Matsumura - Liao Chengzhi meeting and both countries will exchange journalists based on these principles. These are to honor each country's position and keep its rules, even though both countries are different in political doctrine.

== 1968 Amendment ==
On March 6, 1968, Sino-Japanese Memorandum Trade Meeting Communique (Chinese; 中日备忘录贸易会谈公报, Japanese; 日中覚書貿易会談コミュニケ) was issued and both parties agreed to institutionalize the Memorandum Trade (MT贸易 or 覚書貿易) in lieu of Liao-Takasaki Agreement (LT贸易).

In the agreement, both countries state;

"中国方面指出，在中日关系包括我们之间的关系上所存在的障碍，是由于美帝国主义和日本当局推行敌视中国的政策所造成的。
日本方面对于中国方面的立场表示深为理解，并表示今后要为排除这种障碍，促进中日关系正常化，做出进一步的努力。
中国方面再次强调坚持中日关系的政治三原则和政治、经济不可分的原则。日本方面表示同意。双方认为，政治、经济不可分的原则，就是政治和经济是不可分割的，是相互联系、相互促进的，政治关系的改善，才有助于经济关系的发展。"

"China pointed out that the impediment existing in the relationship between China and Japan, including between meeting members', resulted from American imperialism and their hostile policy toward China which Japan supported.

Japan stated Japan expresses deep understanding of China's position, but put aside such barrier from now, and facilitate more effort in normalizing relations between China and Japan.

China emphasized the desire to maintain Three politic principles (政治三原则) and The Inseparable Principle of Politics and Economics in the relationship between China and Japan. Japan agreed. Both countries recognized the idea that The Inseparable Principle of Politics and Economics is that politics and economics are inseparable, relating to and facilitating each other, and the improvement in political relationship contributes to the development of the economical relationship."

On the same day, a meeting to amend the memorandum regarding Sino-Japanese Journalist Exchange Agreement was also arranged.

1 Both parties correspondingly confirmed that the mutual exchange of journalists on the basis of the memorandum regarding journalist exchange was that both countries follow the principle which is indicated in the Meeting Communique announced on March 6, 1968 and it will enhance the mutual understanding and friendship between Japan and China.

2 Both parties correspondingly agreed to amend the number of journalist exchanged, which is stipulated in the paragraph 3 of the memorandum regarding journalist exchange, from within eight persons from each country to within five persons from each country.

3 This arrangement will be the supplement and amendment for the memorandum regarding journalist exchange and have an equivalent effect.

4 This arrangement will be documented in Chinese and in Japanese, and the documents in both languages will be equivalent in effect. Japan-China Memorandum Trade Office (日中覚書貿易事務所; Japan) and Sino-Japanese Memorandum Trade Office (中日備忘録貿易弁事処; China) will keep the memorandum with one in Chinese and one in Japanese together.

March 6, 1968, Beijing

== Three politic principles ==
The Three politic principles (政治三原则) appear in the Sino-Japanese Memorandum Trade Meeting Communique of 1968 are the long-held diplomatic principle which China have often asserted since Liao Chengzhi (廖承志) made a point as the government's official view on Zhou Enlai's (周恩来) behalf when Tadataka Sata (佐多忠隆), Japanese diet member, visited China on August 29, 1958.

According to Zhou Enlai's talk regarding trade between Japan and China (周恩来会见日中贸易促进会专务理事铃木一雄时的谈话) in 1960, Three politic principles will be as follows.

第一，日本政府不能敌视中国。
第二，不能追随美国，搞“两个中国”的阴谋，美国这样做，日本追随，我们当然反对。
第三，不要阻碍中日两国关系向正常化方向发展。

1 Japanese government shall not take a hostile view toward China.
2 Japan shall not follow the United States and the conspiracy of creating two Chinas which the United States contrives. We definitely disagree with Japan's subservience.
3 The development of and the normalization of bilateral relations between China and Japan will not be interfered.

The compliance for these three points were discussed in the meeting for Memorandum Trade (MT贸易).

== Press restraints ==
Joint Communique of Japan and the People's Republic of China was signed in Beijing on September 29, 1972. This established diplomatic relations and made substantial progress in the relationship between China and Japan. On January 5, 1974, China-Japan Trade Agreement (中华人民共和国和日本国贸易协定 or 中日貿易協定) was signed in Beijing. On the same day, Memorandum Regarding Japan-China Continuous Journalist Exchange (日中常駐記者交換に関する覚書) was also exchanged.

The Three political principles still exist. Each Japanese media organization, which sends correspondent to China, is required to agree with the contents of the statement in the documents regarding journalist exchange. This virtually means the journalists are banned from writing a press report that takes a hostile view toward China.

== Deportation proceedings ==
As world media has reported that, China restricts the information of foreign media, that the government assumes is illegal, and gives a deportation order for the journalists and the people who work for the foreign press, include Japanese journalists.

== See also ==
- Censorship in the People's Republic of China
- Freedom of the press

=== Sources ===
- 中日经贸关系六十年 (1945–2005) April 1, 2006 ISBN 7-80688-220-0 (Chinese)
- 日本外交主要文書・年表 第2巻 January, 1984 ISBN 4-562-01445-8 (Japanese)
