= UCWeb =

Chinese mobile Internet company

UCWeb Inc
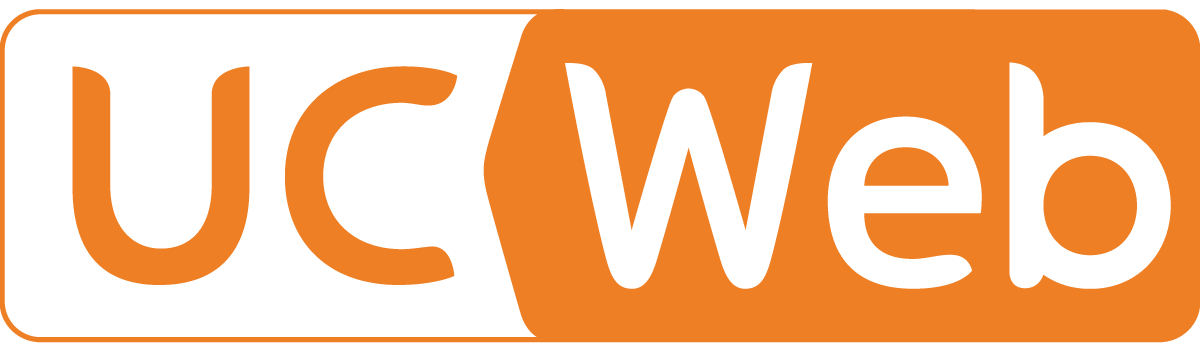
- Industry: Internet
- Founded: 2004; 22 years ago
- Founder: He Xiaopeng; Liang Jie
- Headquarters: Guangzhou, Guangdong, China
- Area served: Worldwide
- Key people: Yu Yongfu (President)
- Products: mobile web browser, mobile search engine, etc.
- Parent: Alibaba Group
- Subsidiaries: UC 9Game (九游)
- Website: www.ucweb.com

UCWeb Inc. (also known as UC Mobile) is a Chinese mobile Internet company that offers products and services that include mobile browser, UC News, and search engine services. Its flagship product, UC Browser, topped the Chinese, Indonesian and Indian markets in 2013.

== Description ==
UCWeb was founded in 2004 as a mobile browser maker. Over the past decade, it diversified to areas such as mobile search, mobile gaming, mobile reading, etc. According to iResearch, in 2014, the company's UC Browser was the most popular browser of its kind in China, with more than 66% market share. It's available in 11 languages (English, Hindi, Russian, Indonesian, Vietnamese, etc.) and on all major mobile OS platforms (iOS, Android, Windows Phone, Java ME, Blackberry, etc.). As of March 2014, UC Browser had over 500 million users around the globe.

In April 2014, UCWeb and Alibaba Group jointly announced the formation of a joint venture named Shenma Inc. (Chinese: 神马搜索; pinyin: Shénmǎ Sōusuǒ) that offers a mobile-only search engine in China. This venture combined UCWeb's large UC Browser user base with Alibaba's e-commerce ecosystem which allowed users to search for applications, videos, novels and products with direct links with Taobao and Tmall. Shenma actually means god horse or divine horse in Chinese while Sōusuǒ (搜索) means “search”; together, the name is Shénmǎ Sōusuǒ, or “God Horse Search.” Originally the product was designed for smartphones rather than desktop computers which indicated the sudden shift of Chinese internet use to mobile devices. It was also intended to challenge Baidu's dominance in mobile search. After its acquisition by Alibaba in 2014, it was more under its control. After the joint venture was finalized UCWeb became an essential part of Alibaba's mobile business operations, and UCWeb chief executive, Yu Yongfu became president of Alibaba's Mobile Business Unit. The unit combined UCWeb's browser, search, app-store, mobile gaming and digital reading businesses with other Alibaba mobile services including those that were associated with AutoNavi, which Alibaba had purchased in 2014. Alibaba's ownership placed UCWeb within a broader digital-media and mobile-services strategy. Former UCWeb chief executive Yu Yongfu was appointed chairman and chief executive of the new group, reporting directly to Alibaba chief executive Daniel Zhang who was later replaced by Eddie Wu.

In June 2014, UCWeb was acquired by Alibaba Group in the largest Chinese Internet merger deal. This will see UCWeb form the Alibaba UC mobile business group by assimilating and consolidating part of mobile-related businesses within the Alibaba Group. After the merger, under the leadership of Yu Yongfu, chief executive of UCWeb since 2006, the Alibaba UC mobile business group will oversee the browser, search, location-based service, app store, mobile gaming, and mobile reader operations. Other browser tools that Alibaba created do not necessarily use UCWeb to function. For example, UCWeb and Accio Work are both products of Alibaba's Group ecosystem, but they are different tools.UC browser as described above is a mobile web browser and an information platform that is used mostly by consumers who want to browse, search and consume content. Accio Work which was launched in 2026 by Alibaba International, is more of an AI agent platform that is used by small and medium businesses to vet suppliers, and vendors, including getting quotes.It can even create online stores for users and uses a browser like a Chromium-based browser to perform specific kinds of tasks like searching, scraping and form filling.

In 2015 it was revealed as part of the Snowden leaks that UCBrowser leaks sensitive IMSI, IMEI and MSISDN data, which was used by intelligence agencies to track users.
