= Liang Jie (businessman) =

Chinese technology executive and entrepreneur

- 梁捷 / Líang Jíe
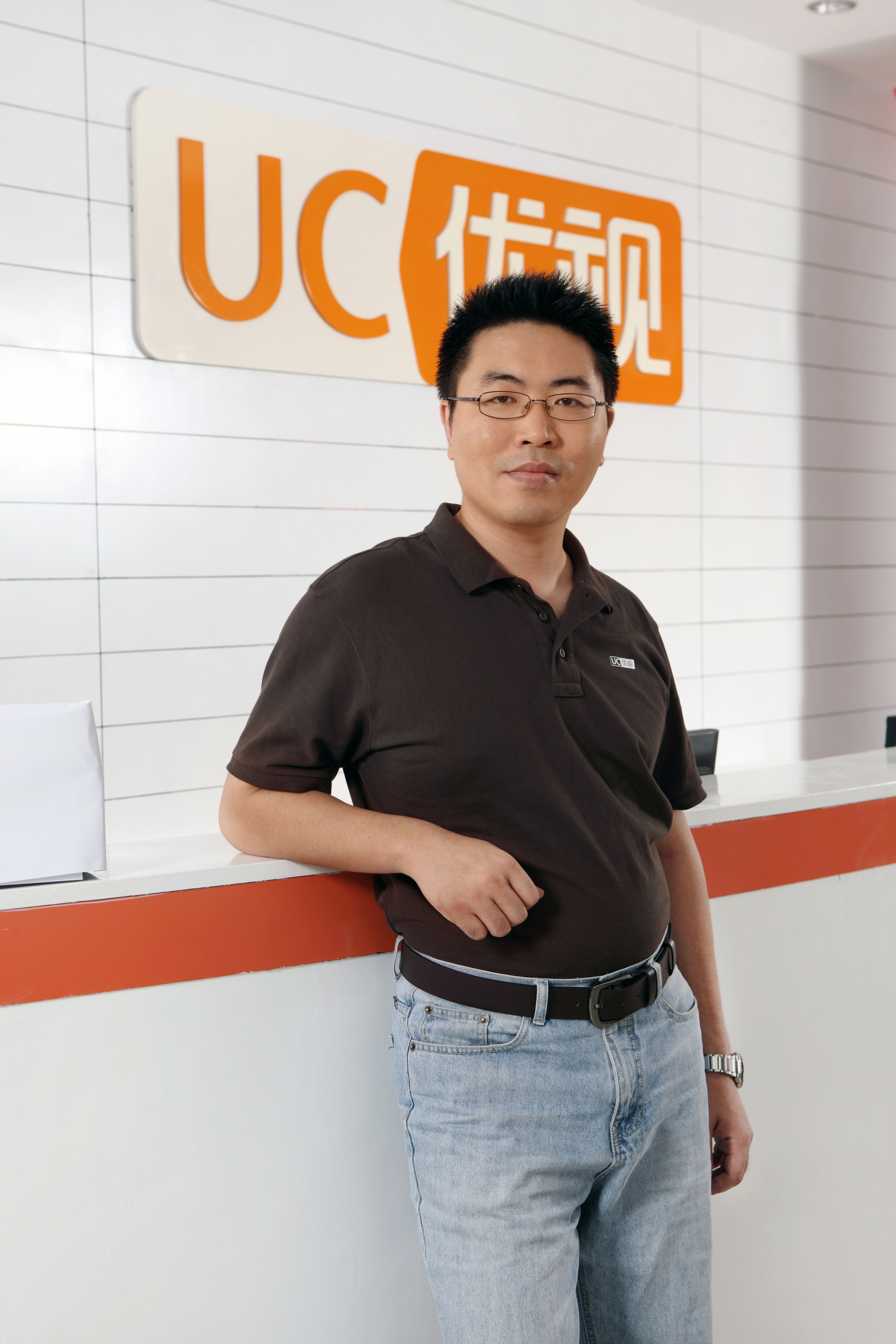
- Liang Jie, co-founder and CTO of UCWeb Inc.; president of Shenma Inc.
- Born: 11 February 1975 (age 51); Guangzhou, Guangdong, China
- Education: South China University of Technology
- Occupations: Co-founder, Chief Technology Officer, UCWeb; President, Shenma Inc.

Liang Jie (Chinese: 梁捷; pinyin: Líang Jíe; born 11 February 1975) is a Chinese technology executive and entrepreneur. He is currently the Chief Technology Officer of UCWeb Inc., a Chinese mobile Internet and software company he co-founded in 2004. UCWeb was acquired by Alibaba Group in June 2014 in the largest Chinese Internet merger deal ever. He is also the president of Shenma Inc., a joint venture formed by UCWeb and Alibaba that offers a mobile-centric search service.

== Biography ==
A Guangzhou native, Liang attended the city's South China University of Technology and graduated with a bachelor's degree in Computer Science in 1998. After graduation, he started his career at Asiainfo Technologies' Guangzhou office in role of software engineer working on large scale email system.

In 2004, he co-founded UCWeb with He Xiaopeng, overseeing the company's R&D and technology innovation-related affairs. He led the company's tech team to build a proprietary mobile browser rendering engine U3 kernel.

In April 2014, UCWeb together with Alibaba incorporated a joint venture (Chinese: 神马搜索; pinyin: Shénmǎ Sōusuǒ; lit. 'god horse search') Shenma Inc., Liang serving as the president of the new entity. He is also an investor in 3 startups incubated in the New Delhi-based Venture Gurukool.

== Prizes ==
- Zhou Guangzhao Foundation Science & Technology Fund Innovation Award
