= Liao Zhongkai =

Chinese-American Kuomintang leader and financier

- 廖仲愷
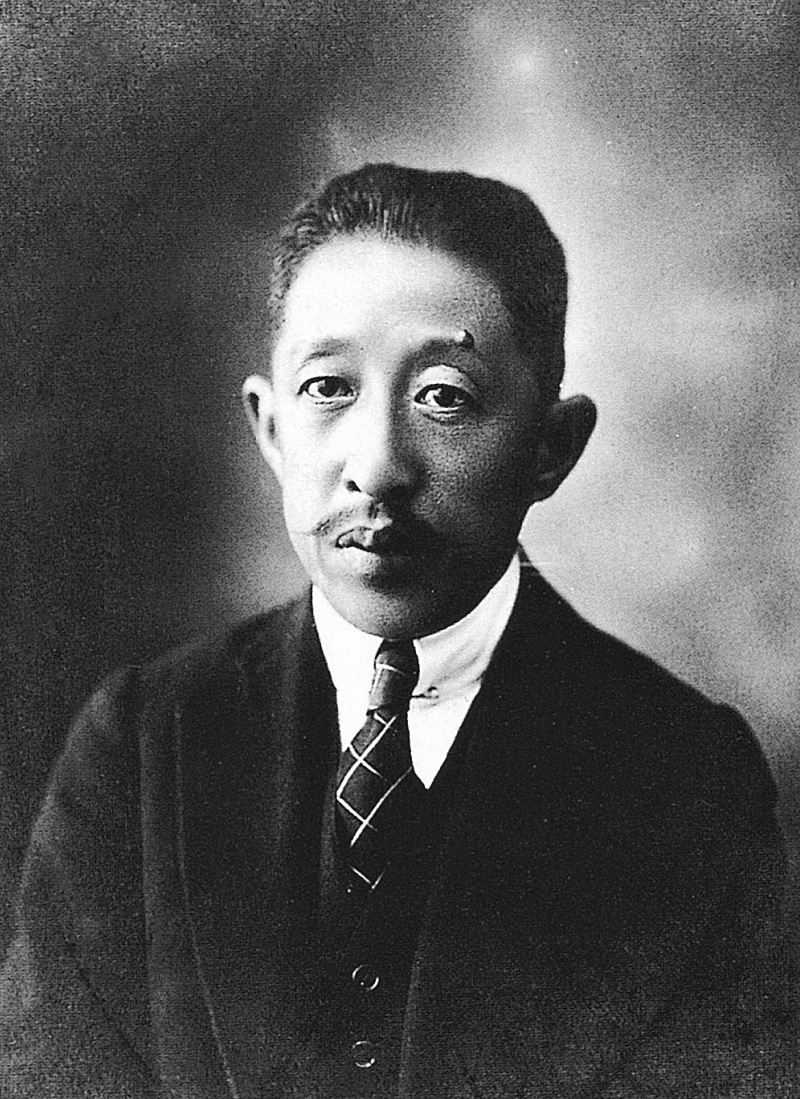
- Liao, sometime before 1920

Member of the Executive Committee of the Kuomintang
- In office 1925–1925
- Premier: Sun Yat-sen

Minister of Finance of the Kuomintang
- In office 1921–1925

Personal details
- Born: April 23, 1877 Alameda, California, U.S.
- Died: August 20, 1925 (aged 48) Canton, Guangdong, China
- Party: Kuomintang
- Spouse: He Xiangning
- Children: Liao Mengxing, Liao Chengzhi
- Parent: Liao Zhubin
- Education: Queen's College; Waseda University; University of Tokyo
- Profession: Revolutionary, financier, businessman, politician, statesman

Chinese name
- Traditional Chinese: 廖仲愷
- Simplified Chinese: 廖仲恺
Transcriptions
Standard Mandarin
- Hanyu Pinyin: Liào Zhòngkǎi
- Wade–Giles: Liao4 Chung4-kʻai3
Yue: Cantonese
- Yale Romanization: Liuh Juhng-hói
- Jyutping: Liu6 Zung6-hoi2

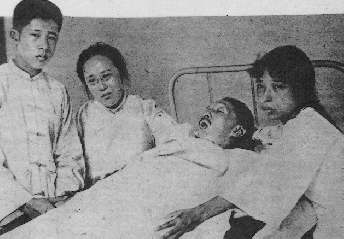
Liao's death. From left: Liao Chengzhi, He Xiangning, Liao Zhongkai and Liao Mengxing

Liao Zhongkai (April 23, 1877 – August 20, 1925) was an American-born Chinese revolutionary. He was a close follower of Sun Yat-sen and was one of the foremost leaders of the Kuomintang (KMT) from its founding until his death. He is considered to have been part of the KMT's left wing and supported the First United Front between the KMT and the Chinese Communist Party (CCP). In August 1925, he was assassinated by members of the KMT's right-wing who were opponents of the First United Front.

== Early life ==
Liao was born in 1877 in Alameda, California and received his early education in the United States. He was one of nineteen children. His father Liao Zhubin, who had five wives, was sent to San Francisco by the Hong Kong and Shanghai Bank.

Returning to Hong Kong in 1893, at the age of sixteen he studied at Queen's College from 1896. He married He Xiangning in 1897. He then went to Japan in January 1903 to study political science at Waseda University. In 1907 he went to Chuo University to study political and economic science.

== In politics ==
Liao joined the Chinese Revolutionary Alliance in 1905 upon its founding and became the director of the financial bureau of Guangdong after the founding of the Republic of China.

In the early struggles of the party, Liao Zhongkai was arrested by Guangdong strongman Chen Jiongming in June 1922. After Chen's defeat Liao became Civil governor of Guangdong from May 1923 to February 1924, and then again from June to September 1924.

Following the Bolshevik Revolution, Sun Yat-sen began a correspondence with the Bolsheviks that grew into the First United Front between his movement, the CCP, and the Soviet Union. Liao Zhongkai strongly supported this move. Soviet advisors began arriving in Guangzhou and helped Sun organize a mass political party. Liao became one of the members of the provisional executive committee of the new Kuomintang (KMT), which met from October 1923 to early 1924. In February 1924, Liao was appointed to head the new Ministry of Labor, which was tasked with bringing the labor movement into the national revolution. He attempted to organize a "Guangzhou Workers' Delegates Conference" the following month, but was met with little interest from unions. It would take a year of hard organizing to build positive relations with the unions and infiltrate party members and sympathizers into the union leadership.

In May 1924, he became political commissar of the newly established Whampoa Military Academy. There, he was in charge of the political training of the future officers of the National Revolutionary Army. When Sun Yat-sen died in March, 1925, and Liao was one of the three most powerful figures in the Kuomintang Executive Committee, the other two were Wang Jingwei and Hu Hanmin. When Hu Hanmin's proposal for a National Government Council was accepted by the KMT's Central Executive Committee, Liao was chosen to be Minister of Finance on July 24. During this time he was considered to be a leader of the KMT's left-wing and strongly supported the First United Front. He was principled in his support of Sun's ideology of Minsheng in the Three Principles of the People.

Beginning with a dispute between Chinese students at Holy Trinity College and the school's administration, a wave of opposition to Christian schools spread through China in 1924. In August, Liao Zhongkai confounded the Anti-Christian Federation with Wu Zhihui. He would go on to oversee many of the anti-Christian demonstrations that spread through central China.

== Death ==
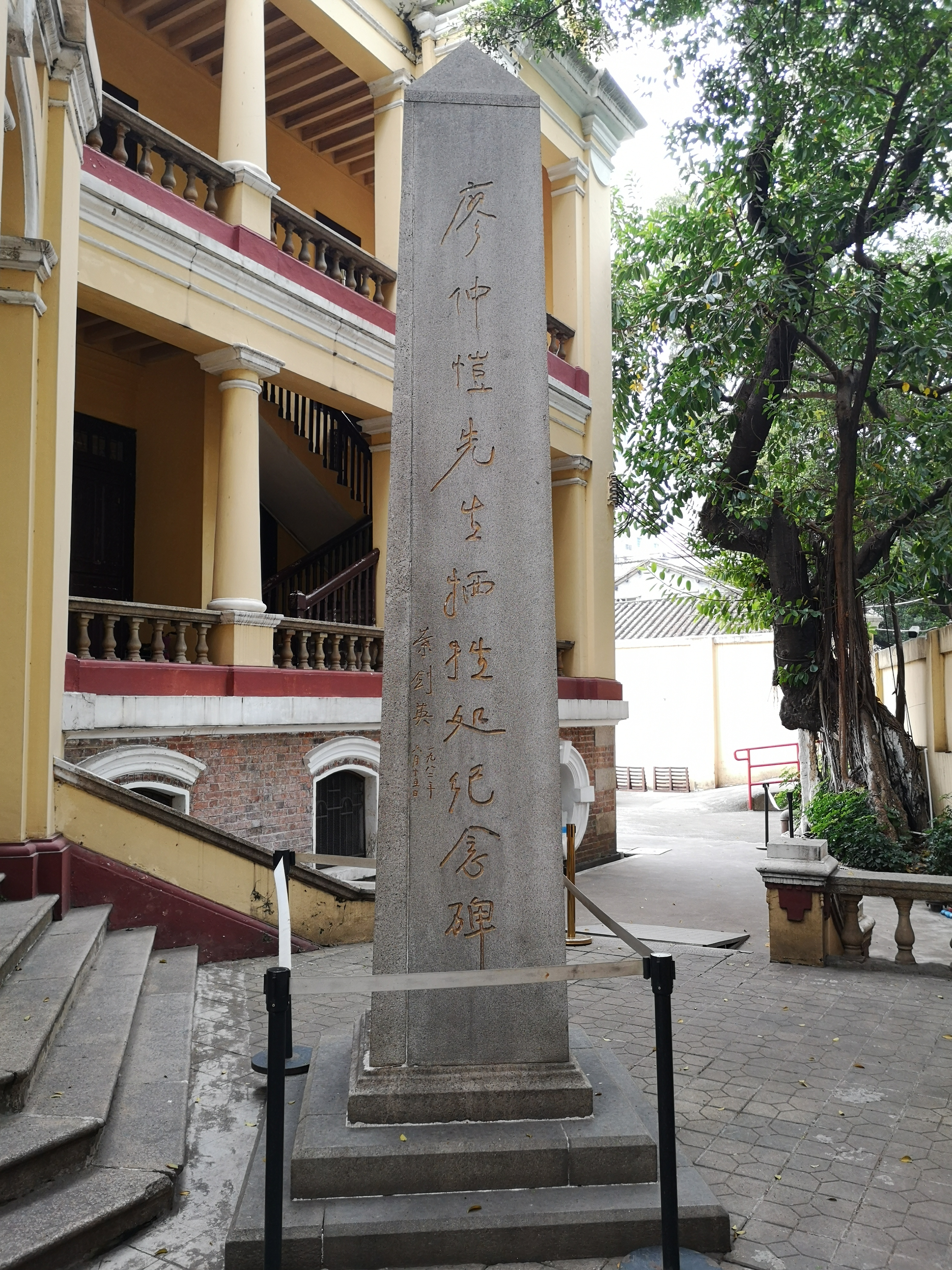
Liao Zhongkai Monument, establishing at the site where he was assassinated

Liao continued his belief in Sun's policy after Sun died, including one of the key policies of maintaining close relations with the Soviet Union as well as the Chinese Communist Party, which was strongly opposed by the KMT right wing. Liao was assassinated before a Kuomintang Executive Committee meeting on August 20, 1925, in Guangzhou, when five gunmen riddled him with bullets from Mauser C96s as he stepped out of his limousine. Suspicion for the act fell upon Hu Hanmin, who was then arrested. This left only Wang Jingwei and the rising Chiang Kai-shek as rivals for control of the Kuomintang.

Liao and He Xiangning had a daughter, Liao Mengxing, and a son, Liao Chengzhi. The latter had four sons, Liao Hui being the eldest. Anna Chennault is his niece.

== Bibliography ==
- Itoh, Mayumi (August 2012). Pioneers of Sino-Japanese Relations: Liao and Takasaki. Palgrave-MacMillan. ISBN 978-1-137-02734-4.
- Zhao, Suisheng (1996). Power by Design: Constitution-Making in Nationalist China. Honolulu: University of Hawaiʻi Press. ISBN 0-8248-1721-4.
- Bastid-Bruguière, Marianne (2002). "Patterns of propaganda organization in the National-revolutionary Movement in China in the 1920s". In Leutner, Mechthild; Felber, Ronald; Titarenko, Mikhail L.; Grigoriev, Alexander M. (eds.). The Chinese Revolution in the 1920s: Between Triumph and Disaster. London; New York: RoutledgeCurzon. ISBN 0-7007-1690-4.
- Barrett, David P. (1982). "The Role of Hu Hanmin in the "First United Front": 1922-27". The China Quarterly. 89.
- Murdock, Michael G. (2006). Disarming the Allies of Imperialism: Agitation, Manipulation, and the State during China's Nationalist Revolution, 1922-1929. Ithaca, N.Y: East Asia Program, Cornell University. ISBN 1885445318.
- Lee, Lily Xiao Hong, ed. (1998). Biographical Dictionary of Chinese Women: The Twentieth Century 1912-2000. Armonk, N.Y: M. E. Sharpe. ISBN 9780765607980.
