= Trend Micro Internet Security =

Antivirus and online security software

- Trend Micro Internet Security 2008
- Developer: Trend Micro
- Stable release: Internet Security 2021/V17.0 / December 2020; 5 years ago
- Operating system: Microsoft Windows
- Type: Antivirus
- License: Proprietary
- Website: trendmicro.com

Trend Micro Internet Security (known as PC-cillin Internet Security in Australia and Virus Buster in Japan) is an antivirus and online security program developed by Trend Micro for the consumer market. According to NSS Lab comparative analysis of software products for this market in 2014, Trend Micro Internet Security was fastest in responding to new internet threats, but as of June 2024 based on the chat support there is no known mechanism as with Microsoft Defender Antivirus to submit false positives like "Incorrectly detected as malware/malicious" or "Incorrectly detected as PUA (potentially unwanted application)" which may point to cutting corners and be the cause of application mislabeling e.g. as ransomware, while the mechanism for detecting real threats is not specified.

In addition to anti-malware and web threat protection, the premium version of this software includes compatibility for PCs, Macs, Android or iOS mobile devices; parental controls; identity theft prevention; a privacy scanner for major social networking sites; and 25 GB of cloud storage.

== Features ==
Features in Trend Micro Internet Security 2015 include:

- Antivirus
- Antispyware
- Antispam
- Email safety scan
- Two-way firewall
- Website authentication
- Home network protection
- Parental controls and filtering

The software also includes:

- Protection against rootkits
- Proactive intrusion blocking
- Personal data leak prevention

Trend Micro Premium Security includes additional features, including:

- Wireless network validation
- keylogger protection
- Online data backup
- Remote file and folder permissions control
- PC tuning and cleanup
- Security programs for mobile devices that run on Android, Symbian, and Windows Mobile operating systems
- Cloud storage (25 GB)

== Effectiveness ==
AV-Comparatives awarded Trend Micro a three-star Advanced + rating–the highest ranking given by the organization–in AV-Comparatives’ Whole Product Dynamic “Real-World” Protection Test for 2014.

AV-TEST in October 2014 gave Trend Micro Internet Security 2015 a score of 17 out of a possible 18 points.

Trend Micro Maximum Security scored the highest success rate in blocking malware downloads in NSS Labs’ 2014 Consumer Endpoint Protection test focused on Socially Engineered Malware. The results were based on continuous series of tests to determine the participants’ effectiveness against socially engineered malware. NSS Labs is an independent network testing facility, security and consultancy organization. NSS Labs also found that Trend Micro had the quickest time in adding protection against unknown threats - less than 15 minutes.

In January 2016 it was discovered that the consumer version of Trend Micro AV allowed any website visited by its users to execute arbitrary code or read all browser passwords on the Windows PC it purportedly protected. A patch was later issued to close the issue.

=== Mobile Security ===
In March 2025, the independent IT security institute AV-TEST evaluated Trend Micro Mobile Security (version 17.1) for Android. The software achieved an overall score of 17 out of 18 points. In the "Protection" category, it demonstrated a 100% detection rate against 3,169 real-time malware samples and 3,200 widespread Android malware samples. The application received a score of 6.0 out of 6.0 for "Performance," indicating no significant impact on battery life or system speed. However, it received a score of 5.0 out of 6.0 for "Usability" due to the absence of a backup feature.

In June 2014, AV-Test published results for its mobile security endurance tests, which assessed more than 30 apps over a six-month period. Trend Micro's mobile security tied for the highest overall score of 13 out of 13 points.

== Version history ==
Previous versions include:

- PC-cillin
- PC-cillin 2
- PC-cillin 95
- PC-cillin 2000
- PC-cillin 2002
- PC-cillin 2003
- PC-cillin Internet Security v11/2004
- PC-cillin Internet Security v12/2005
- PC-cillin Internet Security v14/2006
- Trend Micro Internet Security v15/2007
- Trend Micro Internet Security v16/2008
- Trend Micro Internet Security v17/2009
- Trend Micro Internet Security v18/2010
- Trend Micro Titanium Internet Security v19/2011
- Trend Micro Titanium Internet Security v20/2012
- Trend Micro Titanium Internet Security v21/2013
- Trend Micro Titanium Internet Security v22/2014
- Trend Micro Internet Security v23/2015

As of January 2015, Trend Micro supported Trend Micro Internet Security versions 19/2011 and higher.

PC-cillin 2000 and earlier versions were virus scanners without any additional features. PC-cillin 2002 and 2003 were stand-alone virus scanners which also included a firewall component and improved on the software's scanning and virus detection engine. Newer versions of Trend Micro Internet Security offer additional features such as spyware protection, antispam and an integrated firewall along with an improved scanning and virus detection engine and enhanced heuristics. PC-cillin 2003 was the last stand-alone antivirus product offered by Trend Micro until 2007, when the company released a standalone anti-malware product that offered protection from malicious software including viruses, spyware, and adware.

== See also ==
- Antivirus software
- Internet Security
