= Lingnan University (Guangzhou) =

University in Guangzhou (Canton), China

- Former name: Canton Christian College
- Type: Private University
- Active: 1888–1952
- Location: Guangzhou, China; 23°05′59″N 113°17′39″E
- Website: www.ln.edu.hk (of the successor institution)

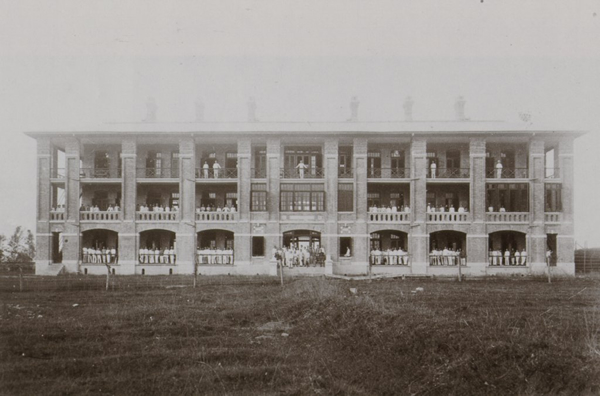
Martin Hall

Lingnan University
- Traditional Chinese: 嶺南大學
- Simplified Chinese: 岭南大学
Transcriptions
Standard Mandarin
- Hanyu Pinyin: Lǐngnán Dàxué
- Wade–Giles: Ling3-nan2 Ta4-hsüeh2
Yue: Cantonese
- Jyutping: ling5 naam4 daai6 hok6

Canton Christian College
- Traditional Chinese: 格致書院
- Simplified Chinese: 格致书院
Transcriptions
Standard Mandarin
- Hanyu Pinyin: Gézhì Shūyuàn
- Wade–Giles: Ko2-chih4 Shu1-yüan4
Yue: Cantonese
- Jyutping: gaak3 zi3 syu1 jyun6*2

Lingnan Academy
- Traditional Chinese: 嶺南學堂
- Simplified Chinese: 岭南学堂
Transcriptions
Standard Mandarin
- Hanyu Pinyin: Lǐngnán Xuétáng
- Wade–Giles: Ling3-nan2 Hsüeh2-t'ang2
Yue: Cantonese
- Jyutping: ling5 naam4 hok6 tong4*2

Lingnan University (simplified Chinese: 岭南大学; traditional Chinese: 嶺南大學; pinyin: Lǐngnán Dàxué; Jyutping: Ling5 Naam4 Daai6 Hok6) was a private university from 1888 to 1952 in Canton, Guangdong, China. It was established by a group of American missionaries in 1888 as the Canton Christian College (格致書院).

When the Communist government reorganized China's higher education in the Soviet model in 1952, Lingnan University's engineering departments were incorporated into the newly established South China Institute of Technology (now South China University of Technology), and the rest of the school was incorporated into Sun Yat-sen University. Lingnan College was reestablished in 1988 within Sun Yat-sen University.

Some members of the university moved to Hong Kong and founded the Lingnan College at Wan Chai in 1967. In 1999, it was relocated to Tuen Mun, acquired university status and renamed as Lingnan University.

== History ==
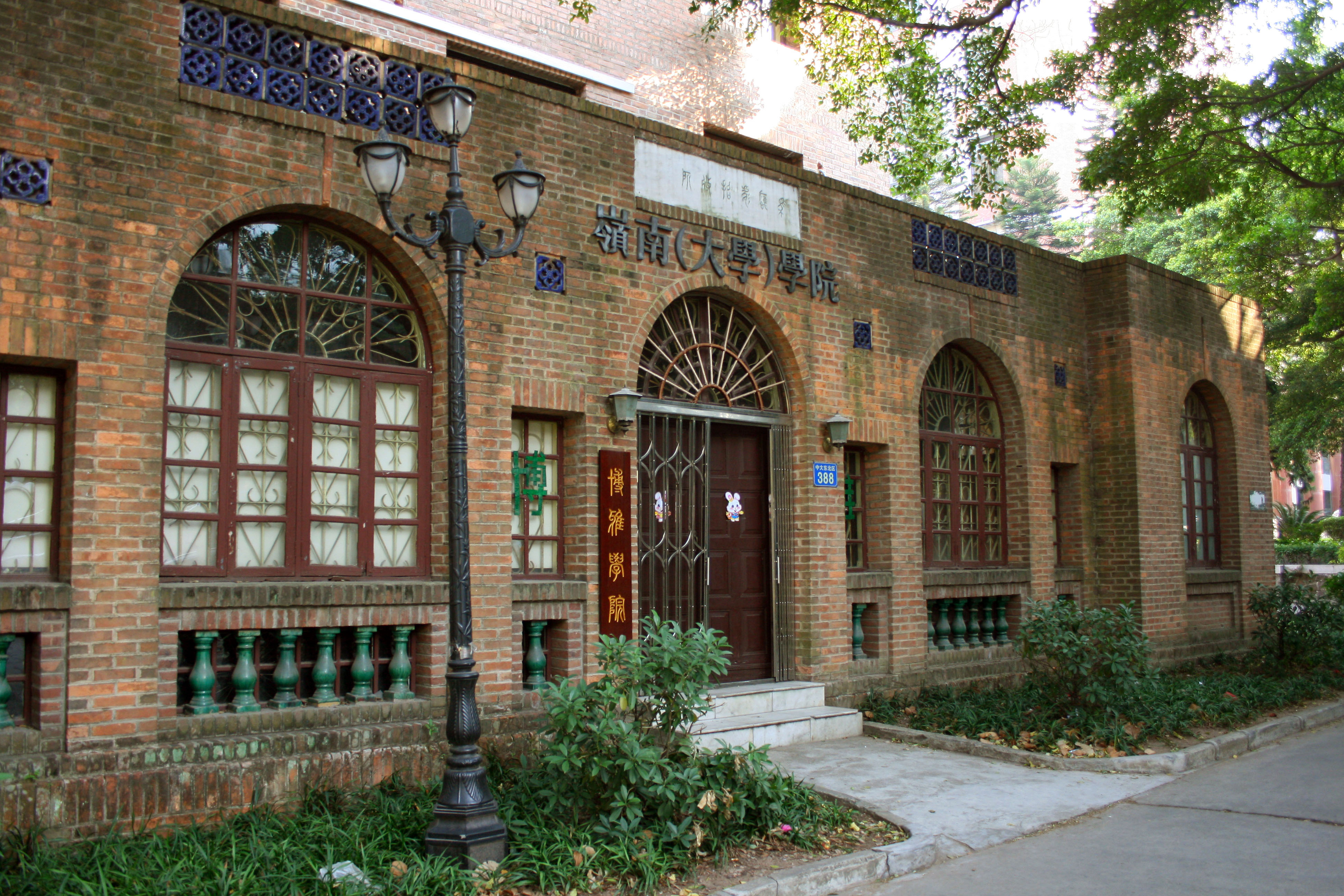
An old building of Lingnan University, now located in Sun Yat-sen University

The university was originally founded in 1888 by Andrew Happer at the request of the American Presbyterian Mission in Canton with the goal of providing a non-denominational Christian education. The university split, relocated, and was separately incorporated several times during its existence. It moved to Macau, then a Portuguese colony, in 1900 to escape the repressive measures implemented by the ruling Qing dynasty of China. In 1903, the Chinese name was changed to Lingnan Academy (Chinese: 嶺南學堂; pinyin: Lǐngnán Xuétáng; Jyutping: ling5 naam4 hok6 tong2) in Macau. It moved back to Canton in 1904.

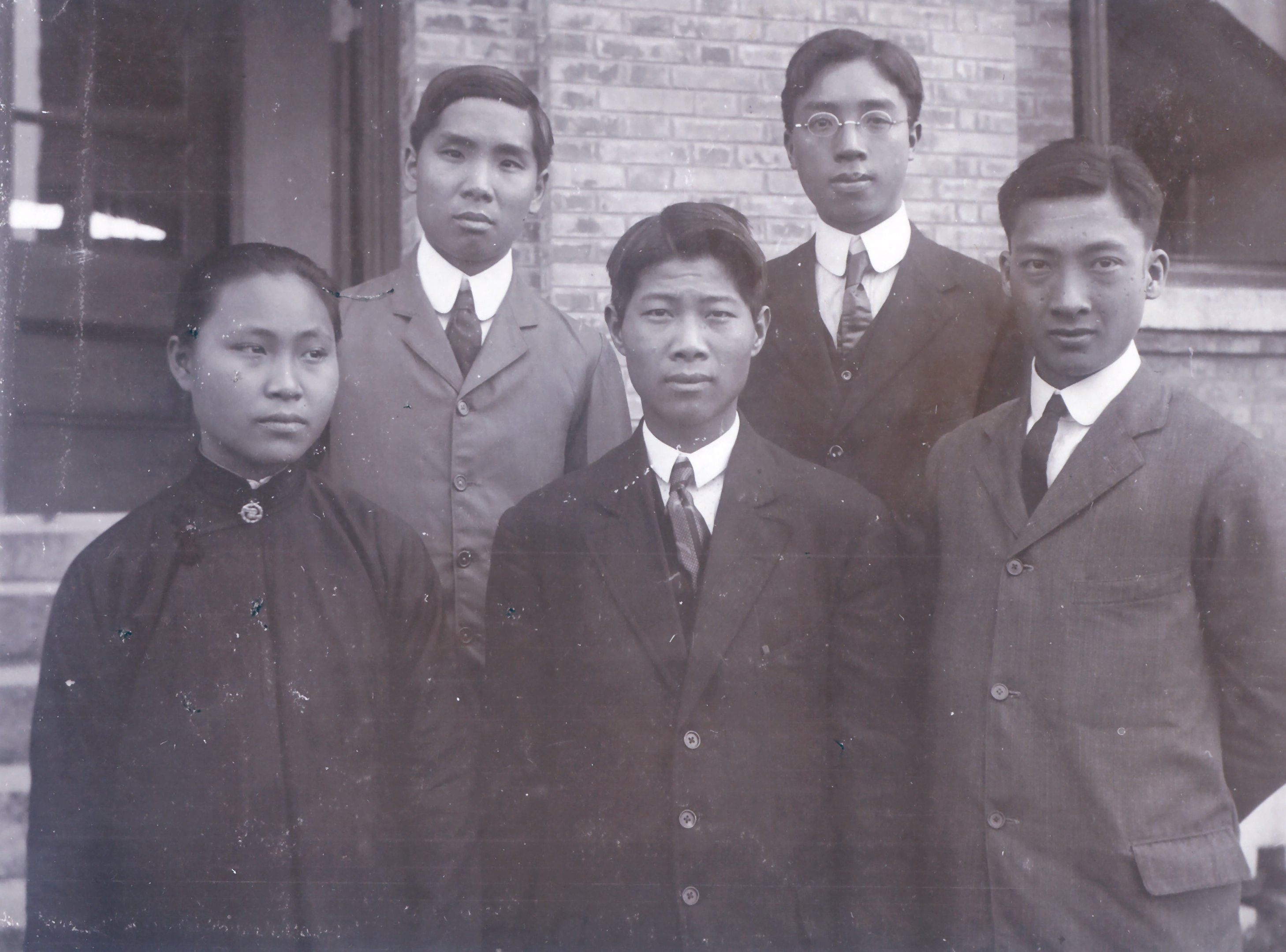
First graduating class of the University Medical School in Canton, 1911

In 1906, the University of Pennsylvania's Christian Association sent University of Pennsylvania School of Medicine graduate Josiah McCracken to Canton to determine whether it would be feasible to take over the medical department of the Canton Christian College. McCracken reported that he thought the organization should follow through, and in 1907 the school was renamed "The University Medical School in Canton, China," and he became its president from 1907 to 1913. In 1913, the Christian Association ended the affiliation with the Canton Christian College and Josiah McCracken helped start a new medical school at St. John's University in Shanghai.

In 1916, the Chinese name was changed again, to Lingnan University (Chinese: 嶺南大學; pinyin: Lǐngnán Dàxué; Jyutping: ling5 naam4 daai6 hok6), as the college expanded to become a university. In 1927, management of the university passed into Chinese hands, and the English name was changed to Lingnan University, the transliteration of the school's Chinese name. Dr. Chung Wing Kwong became the first Chinese principal of the university. On July 23, 1930, the property of the Canton Medical Missionary Society and Hospital were transferred to the board of directors at Lingnan University. A branch in Hainan with an emphasis on agricultural studies was founded in 1933.

=== Hackett Medical College for Women ===
The Hackett Medical College for Women (夏葛女子醫學院, the first medical college for women in China) and its affiliated hospital known as David Gregg Hospital for Women and Children (Chinese name is 柔濟醫院), located in Guangzhou, China, were parts of a medical center that was founded by female medical missionary Dr. Mary H. Fulton (1854–1927). Dr. Fulton was sent by the Foreign Missions Board of the Presbyterian Church (USA), with the support of the Lafayette Avenue Presbyterian Church of Brooklyn, New York, of which David Gregg was pastor. The college was dedicated in 1902 and offered a four-year medical curriculum. At the end of 1932, the medical center was registered and put under the control of the Chinese government. Furthermore, it affiliated with Guangzhou Hospital and Lingnan University to form the Sun Yat-Sen Medical College in 1936.

During the 1930s and 40s, the university was forced to move several times as Japanese armies advanced across China. In 1937, it relocated to Hong Kong as the Japanese occupied Canton, and in 1942, to Qujiang, Shaoguan in northern Guangdong Province, as the Japanese occupied Hong Kong. After World War II, the university was finally able to return to Canton.

In 1953, Lingnan University was incorporated into Chung Shan University (now Sun Yat-sen University). Members of the university who fled from China's Communist rule to Hong Kong founded the Lingnan College in Hong Kong to continue the spirit of the university in 1967. That college became Lingnan University in 1999.

== Presidents ==
1. Charles K. Edmunds (1907–1924)

== Notable alumni ==
- Lee Sun Chau, graduate of Hackett Medical College for Women and one of the first female Chinese doctors of Western Medicine in China
- Liang Yusheng, wuxia novelist
- Wing-tsit Chan, eminent Chinese philosopher and academic
- Wong Shik Ling, a linguist and prominent scholar in Cantonese research.
- Paul Kwong, Archbishop of Hong Kong
- Rong Baisheng, architect
- Coral Wong, graduate of Hackett Medical College for Women and medical superintendent of the Ningteh Hospital for the Church Missionary Society (CMS)
