= UC Browser =

Chinese web browser developed by UCWeb Inc

- Screenshot A screenshot of UC Browser for Android.
- Developer: UCWeb Alibaba Group
- Release: 2004; 22 years ago

Stable release(s)
- Windows: 6.0.1308.1016 (Aug 17, 2023); Android: 15.1.2.1388 (March 20, 2026)
- Engine: Blink, V8
- Operating system: Platforms: iOS; iPadOS; Android; Windows Phone; Windows 10 Mobile; Windows RT; S60; Windows CE; Microsoft Windows; Tizen; Bada; KaiOS; Fire OS; ChromeOS; Linux; Ubuntu; BlackBerry 10
- Standards: HTML5, CSS3
- Available in: 25 languages
- List of languages Chinese, English, Urdu, Bangla, Hindi, Nepali, Tamil, Telugu, Vietnamese, Indonesian, Portuguese, Spanish, Russian, Arabic, Farsi, Marathi, Kannada, Bhojpuri, Thai
- Type: Mobile browser
- License: Proprietary software with EULA (link) and Terms of Use (link)
- Website: www.ucweb.com

UC Browser is a web browser developed by mobile internet company UCWeb, a subsidiary of the Alibaba Group. It was the most popular mobile browser in India, Indonesia, and Mali, as well as the second-most popular one in China as of 2017. Its world-wide browser share as of November 2025 is 0.59% (and 1.07% on smartphones) according to StatCounter.

Originally launched in April 2004 as a Java-only application, it was subsequently made available on a number of platforms including Android, iOS, BlackBerry OS, Java ME, Symbian, Windows Phone, and Microsoft Windows. As of 2026, Android, IOS, and Microsoft Windows are supported platforms for the browser.

Shortly after the China–India skirmishes started, the browser became the subject of privacy and security controversies and was banned in India on 29 June 2020.

== Functionality ==
UC Browser is a cross-platform web browser primarily targeted at mobile phones. It is known for its small app size and data compression technology, making it popular in emerging markets where people tend to have mobile phones with more limited device memory and internet bandwidth. In particular, the browser makes use of proxy servers, which run data through UCWeb servers before sending it to the user's device, enabling data compression but also posing privacy risks. Additional features of the browser include cloud acceleration, multi-file format downloading, HTML5 web app and cloud syncing features, and "fast download", a feature that downloads files in multiple parts simultaneously.

=== Platforms ===
As of 2025, UC Browser is only available as an Android app, according to UCWeb. UC browser is a mobile web browser from UCWeb which Alibaba purchased in 2014. The development of the UC Browser has been shaped by Alibaba's broader mobile strategy since Alibaba purchased it in 2014. It remains mostly focused on Android devices, where it has continued to receive updates aimed at improving speed, data compression and video playback. Over time it has also been used as a gateway to Alibaba-linked services, reflecting the company's interest in mobile traffic and ecosystem integration.At the same time, UC Browser has faced periodic criticism over privacy and security issues which as impacted its reputation in various markets. These developments indicate that Alibaba is trying to expand beyond the basic e-commerce model to mobile internet services. By 2025, UCWeb was only available as an android application, while it was available as a wider platform earlier. Some Chinese Android application stores in 2021 removed the application.

=== Data compression ===
UC Browser uses proxy servers to compress web pages before sending them to users. This process requires less memory on the user's device and lowers data costs; however, it also poses privacy and security risks as all of the data accessed by the user through UC Browser first runs through a UCWeb server, rather than going directly to the user's device.

=== UC+: HTML5, WebApp and add-ons ===
In July 2013, UCWeb announced the UC+ Open Platform. The platform consists of a WebApp store, an add-on platform and an Application Bookmark Platform. It went live with the launch of UC Browser v9.2 for Android.

Developers can use a provided SDK to create programs that the browser runs in different scenarios. Users can download and install them from the browser's add-on panel. Examples include sharing to social media, webpage translation, augmented reality, and voice control. The Application Bookmark Platform allows partner websites to put up a QR code on UC Browser for users to scan, which adds the webpage to their bookmarks. This platform was among the first in China.

=== Download management ===
The browser supports simultaneous downloads and includes a download manager, including pages for offline reading. It supports pausing and resuming downloads. The current version of the download manager has features designed to solve common problems while downloading, such as an intermittent internet connection and mislabeled files. The download process can continue after the app is closed, and can also automatically resume if the download is interrupted. The download manager sorts downloaded files by type and places them in respective folders.

=== Cloud system ===
UCWeb claims that the cloud system used by the browser tends to fetch data from the closest servers available, making the loading process quicker and smoother for users.

== Privacy and security vulnerabilities ==
In May 2015, the American National Security Agency (NSA) documents leaked by whistleblower Edward Snowden indicated that UC Browser leaks sensitive data like international mobile subscriber identities, international mobile station equipment identities, MSISDN's, Android ID's, MAC addresses, and geolocation and Wi-Fi-related data without any encryption. These leaks are used by intelligence agencies to track users. The documents also revealed that the Australian Signals Directorate (ASD) had identified UC Browser as a security weak point. Its widespread use in China, India and Indonesia made it particularly attractive to ASD's exploits. The Snowden documents revealed that in cooperation with its Five Eyes partners, ASD hacked the UC Browser and infected smartphones with spyware. The ASD declined to comment in relation to the revelations.

Following the leaks, the Citizen Lab based at the University of Toronto published an independent report corroborating numerous privacy and security issues with both the English language and Chinese language editions of the Android version of UC Browser. The report criticized the transmission of personally identifiable information to various commercial analytics tools and the transmission of user search queries without encryption. They also managed to bypass the encryption of UC Browser, leading them to accuse UCWeb of using non-effective encryption systems to transmit personally identifiable subscriber data, mobile device identifiers, and user geolocation data.

In May 2016, Alibaba Group provided Citizen Lab with updated versions of UC Browser in order to verify their security fixes to these issues. The subsequent update published by Citizen Lab indicated that not all of the previously identified data leaks and privacy breaches had been fixed in UC Browser.

In 2017, the Centre for Development of Advanced Computing (C-DAC), a scientific research unit within India's Ministry of Electronics and Information Technology (MEITY), began a technical investigation into the "several major privacy and security vulnerabilities that would seriously expose users of UC Browser to surveillance and other privacy violations" alleged in the report. C-DAC found that the browser (which was the second-most-used browser in India) had been sending user data to Chinese servers and that it retains control over a user's device DNS even after the browser is deleted.

In March 2019, analysts at the anti-malware firm Doctor Web publicly disclosed that UC Browser and UC Browser Mini for Android were downloading and installing extra modules from the company's own servers via an unprotected HTTP channel. This exposed browser users to potential arbitrary remote code execution if an attacker was able to perform a man-in-the-middle attack to deliver malicious module (but no cases of exploitation were publicly disclosed). Furthermore, this violates Google Play policies that forbid Google Play apps from downloading any executable code from any sources outside of Google Play. In June 2020, a new version of its UC browser was added to the Google Play store with updated settings that comply with the store's security guidelines.

In May 2019, Indian security researcher Arif Khan reported that the URL address bars on the UC Browser and UC Browser Mini apps were susceptible to URL spoofing.

In June 2021, it was discovered that the app was recording user data and sending IP addresses to Alibaba servers.

== Market adoption ==
UC Browser gained significant popularity in China, India, and Indonesia in 2012 through 2017 and still retains some popularity in China. In October 2012, UC Browser topped Opera in Google Play's free Android app download category in India for the first time. Google Zeitgeist 2013 showed that the "Most Searched Mobile Apps" in India were dominated by messaging and browsing apps, with WhatsApp and UC Browser topping the rankings for the most searches on mobile in 2013. As of March 2014, UC Browser had over 500 million users, largely in China, India, and Indonesia, and as of 2016 it had more than 100 million monthly active users. According to the app analytics firm App Annie, UC Browser was the 8th most downloaded mobile app of the 2010–2019 decade.

However, according to independent web analytics firm StatCounter, UC Browser had never been the leading browser in China and had never exceeded 20% browser share there. As of March 2021, Google Chrome had 43% browser share, while UC Browser had 18%.

In India UC Browser was the leading browser from October 2013 through June 2017, peaking at 46% browser share. As of March 2021, Google Chrome had 85% browser share, while UC Browser had 4.3% share.

In Indonesia UC Browser was the leading browser from July 2015 much of the time until March 2017, peaking at 51% browser share. As of March 2021, Google Chrome had 81% browser share, while UC Browser had 1.9% share.

In May 2020 India's National Security Council recommended that UC Browser and other Chinese-owned apps be blocked due to cyber-security concerns following the 2020 China–India skirmishes .

== History ==
UC Browser was initially launched in April 2004 as a J2ME-only application.

The logo of UC Browser was redesigned in 2012, from a cartoon squirrel to a more abstract and stylized squirrel that's more in line with American designs.

In May 2013, UCWeb customized its browser for Vodafone's Indian customers.

In August 2013, UC Browser provided distribution channels of companies like AppURL Initiative and partnered with distributor Gameloft to sell its products.

In 2013 also it announced a partnership with Trend Micro, under which both companies worked to provide mobile web safety assessments in the browser. After the acquisition of UCWeb in 2014, UC Browser became part of Alibaba's mobile-internet business, alongside the company's broader investment in mobile services and digital commerce.

On 26 June 2020, the Government of India banned UC Browser, along with 58 other Chinese apps such as TikTok and WeChat, citing data and privacy issues and claiming that it is a "threat to the sovereignty and integrity" of the country. Many experts believe that the move was a retaliation to the 2020 China–India skirmishes between India and China.

In March 2021 the browser was removed from several Chinese app stores over a complaint that it was selling misleading medical adverts when searching for hospitals in the browser. It was still available on Apple Inc's Chinese app store.

== See also ==
- CM Browser
- QQ browser
- Opera (web browser)
- Opera Mini, a server-based compressing browsing system
- Bolt (web browser), a discontinued server-based compressing browsing system
- List of web browsers
