= Qixia =

Qixia (栖霞) may refer to the following locations in China:

- Qixia, Shandong (栖霞市), county-level city of Yantai, Shandong
- Qixia District (栖霞区), Nanjing
- Qixia Temple (栖霞寺), Buddhist temple in Nanjing
- Qixia Mountain (栖霞山), a tourist attraction in Nanjing
