= Gao Qifeng =

Chinese painter (1889–1933)

- 高奇峰
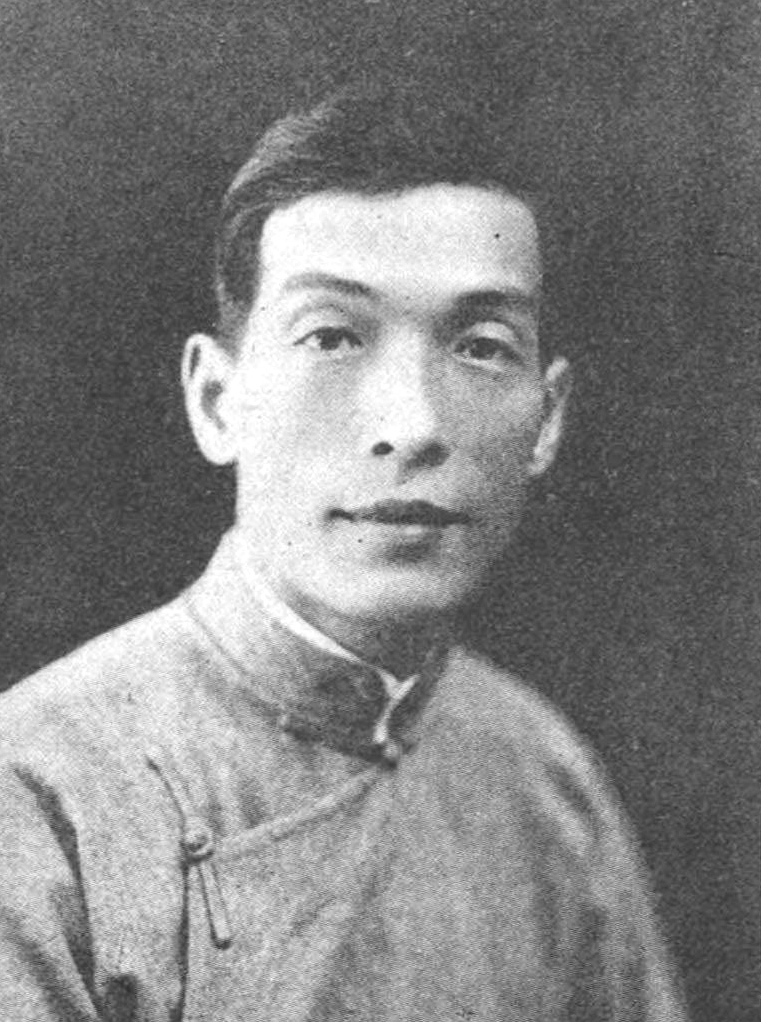
- Gao, c. 1927
- Born: Gao Weng (高嵡); 13 June 1889; Panyu County, Guangdong, Qing dynasty
- Died: 2 November 1933 (aged 44); Shanghai, Republic of China
- Movement: Lingnan School
- Relatives: Gao Jianfu (brother)

Chinese name
- Chinese: 高奇峰
Transcriptions
Standard Mandarin
- Hanyu Pinyin: Gāo Qífēng
- Wade–Giles: Kao^{1} Chʻi^{2}-feng^{1}
- IPA: [káʊ tɕʰǐ.fə́ŋ]
Yue: Cantonese
- Yale Romanization: Gou^{1} Kei^{4}-fung^{1}
- Hong Kong Romanisation: Ko Kei-fung
- IPA: [kɔw˥ kʰej˩.fʊŋ˥]

Gao Qifeng (Chinese: 高奇峰; pinyin: Gāo Qífēng; 13 June 1889 – 2 November 1933) was a Chinese painter who co-founded the Lingnan School with his older brother Gao Jianfu and fellow artist Chen Shuren. Orphaned at a young age, Gao spent much of his childhood following Jianfu, learning the techniques of Ju Lian before travelling to Tokyo in 1907 to study Western and Japanese painting. While abroad, Gao joined the revolutionary organization Tongmenghui to challenge the Qing dynasty; after he returned to China, he published the nationalist magazine The True Record, which later fell afoul of the Beiyang government. Although offered a position in the Republic of China, Gao chose to focus on his art. He moved to Guangzhou in 1918, taking a series of teaching positions that culminated with an honorary professorship at Lingnan University in 1925. Falling ill in 1929, Gao left the city for Ersha Island, where he took students and established the Tianfang Studio.

In his painting, Gao blended traditional Chinese approaches with foreign ones, using Japanese techniques for light and shadow as well as Western understandings of geometry and perspective. Although he painted landscapes and figures, he is most recognized for his paintings of animals, particularly eagles, lions, and tigers. In his brushwork, he combined the vigour of his brother's technique with the elegance of Chen's. Gao taught numerous students, including Chao Shao-an and Huang Shaoqiang; he was particularly close to Zhang Kunyi, with whom he may have been romantically involved.

== Biography ==
=== Early life ===
Gao was born Gao Weng (高嵡) in Yuangang Township, Panyu County, Guangdong, on 13 June 1889. The family was poor, and his father Boxiang died in 1895; his mother followed two years later. A sickly child, Gao was sent to live with a relative. One of six brothers, he ultimately became the ward of his brother Jianfu – ten years his elder – and followed him into the arts.

In his youth, Gao learned the water infusion and "boneless" painting techniques employed by Ju Lian. Sources disagree to the provenance of this knowledge. Gao Jianfu is known to have studied under Ju at his Xiaoyue Qin Pavilion, (Note: Croizier (2023, p. 16) translates this as Hall of the Whispering Lute.) and thus he is often attributed as teaching them to his brother. Others have suggested that Gao Qifeng studied directly with Ju. (Note: As an example, Croizier (2023, p. 16) provides the Biographical Dictionary of Republican China; Ou Haonian of the Lingnan Fine Arts Museum also indicates that Gao Qifeng studied directly under Ju Lian (Au, Gao Qifeng).) No archival material has been found to support the latter scenario, and Ralph Croizier notes in his study of the Lingnan School that, if true, Gao studied under Ju only briefly.

Gao attended a Christian school by the age of fourteen, and later converted to Christianity. In the mid-1900s, he took an apprenticeship with Pastor Wu Shiqing, painting lampshades at his Yongming Zhai glass shop. He later worked with Wu's brother Jinghun to open another storefront. As an adult, he took the courtesy name Qifeng. On his early paintings, he used the art name Fei Pu (飞瀑); the seal with which he signed his paintings was marked Fei Pu Sketching.

=== Artistic career ===
In 1907, Gao travelled to Tokyo with his brother to further study art. While Jianfu was enrolled at the Tokyo School of Fine Arts, Gao became a student of Tanaka Raishō; he appears to have also drawn influence from artists such as Takeuchi Seihō and Hashimoto Kansetsu. All of these artists promoted the nihonga style, which blended Western techniques with Japanese ones. (Note: Contemporary art discourse in Meiji Japan was divided between yōga, which advocated for high levels of Western-style realism, and nihonga, which sought to blend realism with traditional elements. Gao Jianfu joined art societies associated with both styles (Chu 1981, p. 7).) Through his studies, Gao learned Western approaches to perspective and sketching and became familiar with the works of the Kyoto school. He developed a style that blended these various influences, seeking to combine the naturalism of Western art with the lyricism and philosophy of traditional Chinese painting.

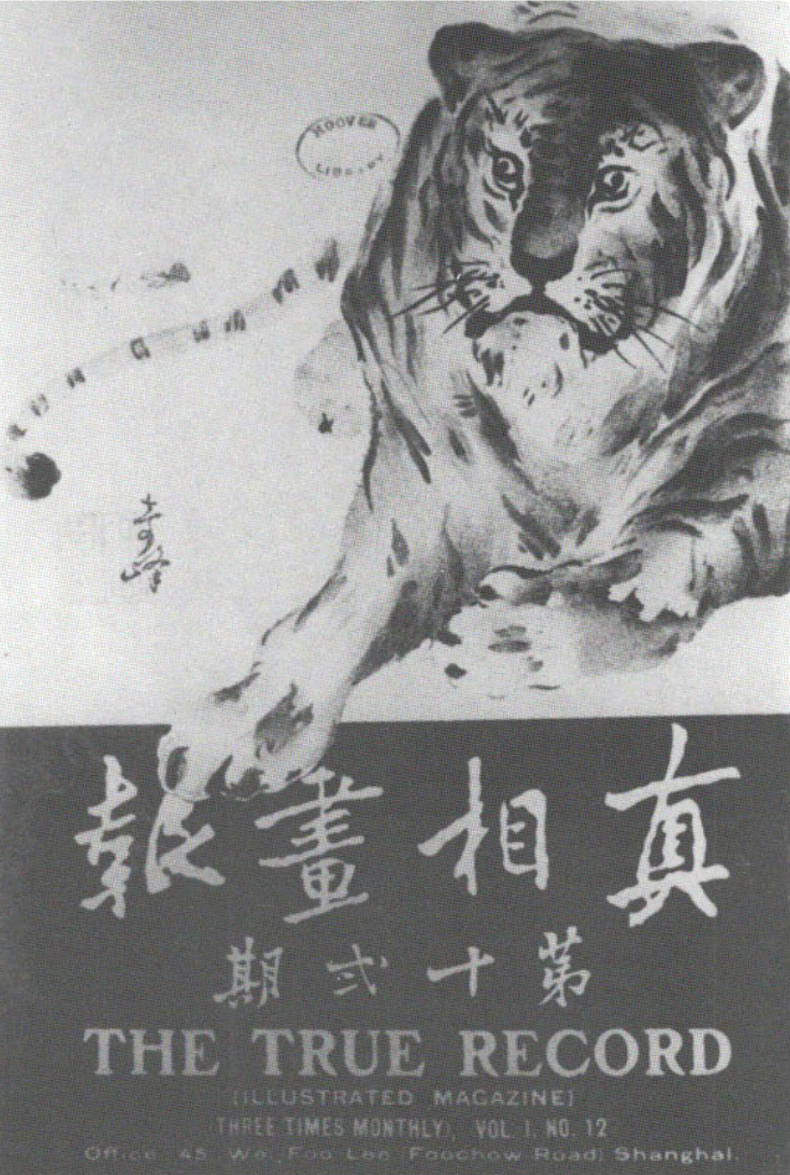
The True Record, with a cover illustration by Gao

After returning to China in 1908, the Gao brothers moved to Nanhai. Gao Qifeng became a teacher at the Nanhai Middle School, while also learning psychology and sociology, holding that the truth, goodness, and beauty of art could better address the human condition with insight into the problems of society. (Note: Chu (1981, p. 8) quotes Gao as saying, "In our endeavour to learn how to paint ... we must not only equip ourselves with a useful knowledge about anatomy, colouring, light and shade, philosophy, nature, the six principles handed down by ancient artists, and the development of the art, but must also conduct adequate researches into the realm of psychology and sociology in order that we may gain a clear idea of what is most adapted to the present needs of society. We can then make use of the principle of vividness, naturalness, and beautifulness and turn out such inspiring and allegorical pictures as will tend to blot out the blemishes of society." Translation by Chu.) Teaching art, Gao believed, would allow the transmission of a better understanding of ethics and social conditions. In 1908, he donated several paintings to a fundraiser for flooding victims in western Guangdong.

In Japan, the Gao brothers had joined the Tongmenghui, an organization established to overthrow the Qing dynasty. Gao Jianfu arranged the assassinations of several Qing leaders, with the death of General Fengshan attributed to a painter whom he had recruited; Gao Qifeng may also have been involved in this cell, and his friend and fellow revolutionary Wang Jingwei recalled him sleeping soundly in a room full of explosives. After the 1911 Revolution, the brothers were offered positions in the new Republic of China by Tongmenghui leader Sun Yat-sen, but declined.

Instead, the Gao brothers moved to Shanghai and established The True Record, a large-format magazine that consisted of pictures, paintings, cartoons, chronicle paintings, essays, reviews, and sketches. This nationalist magazine, subsidized in part by the new government, published seventeen issues between June 1912 and March or April 1913, with Gao Qifeng as the editor-in-chief. The Gaos believed that pictorials could best "arouse people's patriotic thoughts and support the order of social progress". (Note: Original: ｢唤起人群爱国之思想，扶植社会进行之秩序｣) In essays, the brothers called for the creation of a new approach to art, as well as improvements in art education; other parts of the magazine offered news and social commentary. They also decried the increasingly authoritarian Beiyang government.

Gao – writing with Xie Yingbo and Ma Xiaojin – published an article in 1913 implicating Provisional President Yuan Shikai in the assassination of nationalist leader Song Jiaoren. According to the writer Cai Dengshan, Yuan thus issued a warrant for their arrest, and Gao began a self-imposed exile in Japan. This claim is not supported universally among scholars, (Note: Gao's Japanese exile is also mentioned by the Hong Kong Museum of Art (Urban Council 1981, p. 22) and Liang (2022b). Liang and Cai differ, however, on the year of Gao's return to China. Liang (2022b) suggests that Gao returned to China in early 1914, while Cai (2023) asserts that he only returned after Yuan Shikai's death in 1916.) though Gao is thought to have spent time learning woodblock printing in Japan. As the decade continued and China's nascent democracy devolved into corruption and warlordism, Jianfu grew disenchanted with politics; the art critic Li Yuzhong suggests that Qifeng was likely influenced by his brother in this regard.

In the 1910s, the Gaos had established the Aesthetic Institute, a combined gallery, exhibition hall, and publishing house, in Shanghai. Through the bookstore, they sold reproductions of Chinese and Western paintings, including their own works. As the decade continued, Gao devoted himself exclusively to painting and teaching. He moved to Guangzhou in 1918 to lead the Art and Printmaking Department at the Class A Industrial School. He also established the Aesthetics Museum on Fuxue West Street. In 1925, Gao was made an honorary professor at Lingnan University (now part of Sun Yat-sen University). He was provided land upon which he built a studio; according to the curator Christina Chu, these were his most productive years.

Through the 1920s, Gao gained increasing recognition for his artwork, and he was frequently featured in The Young Companion, a bilingual pictorial magazine published in Shanghai. Prior to the construction of the Sun Yat-sen Memorial Hall, Gao was asked to contribute three of his works: Sea Eagle (海鷹), White Horse in the Autumn River (秋江白馬), and Lion (雄獅); during his lifetime, Sun Yat-sen had expressed a fondness for these paintings, none of which has survived.

=== Later years and death ===
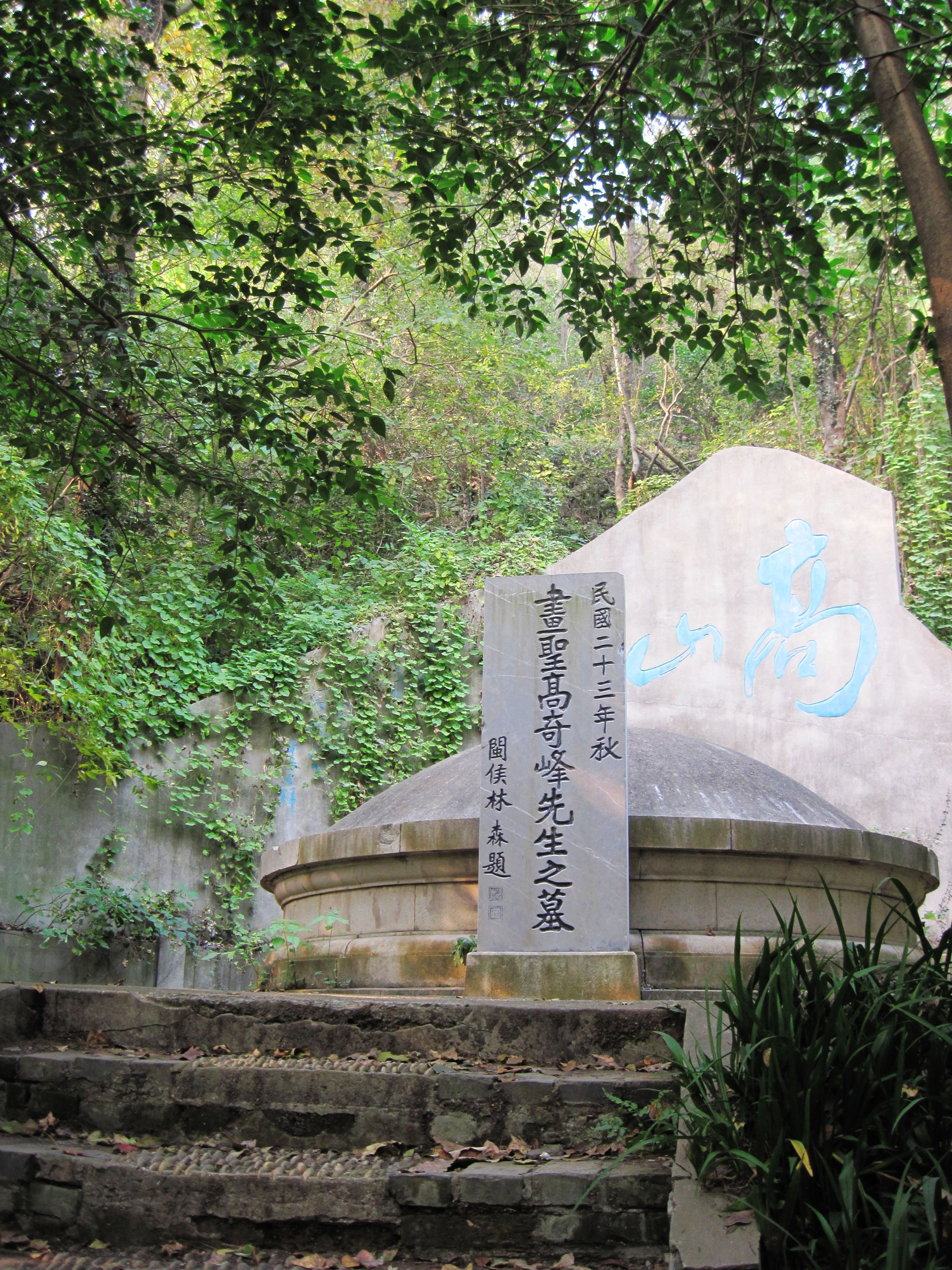
Gao's tomb at Qixia Mountain

Around 1929, Gao fell ill with pneumonia and removed himself from the city to recover, being admitted to the Zhujiang Nursing Home on Ersha Island in the Pearl River. After a year, Gao was released, choosing to establish the Tianfang Studio (Note: Also "Pavilion". Tianfang translates to "Heavenly Breeze" (HKHM, The Heavenly Breeze) or "Heavenly Wind" (Croizier 2023, p. 86).) on the island to continue his work. There, he taught numerous students, with the seven most famous becoming known as the Tianfeng Seven. However, Gao remained sickly, and his productivity suffered; he only made one trip, to Guilin in 1931, to find new inspirations and materials.

In 1933, an exhibition of contemporary Chinese painting was scheduled in Berlin. (Note: Titled the Ausstellung Chinesische Malerei der Gegenwart ("Exhibition of Contemporary Chinese Painting") (Liang 2022a), this was one of several events highlighting Chinese painting that were organized in Europe between 1931 and 1935; others were held in Frankfurt (1931), Paris (1933), and London (1935) (Su 2021, p. 144).) Gao was selected as a government representative, (Note: Other representatives included Xu Beihong, Chen Shuren, Liu Haisu, and Ye Gongchuo (Cai 2023). Liu was the primary organizer (Su 2021, p. 136).) and asked to travel to Shanghai for a preliminary meeting. On the ship from Guangzhou, Gao fell ill, and his fellow passenger Ye Gongchuo sought medical attention. Gao was diagnosed with tuberculosis, and after the ship arrived in Shanghai he was brought to Dahua Hospital.

Gao died on 2 November 1933, aged 44. Before his death, he had asked that his artworks be donated to museums and that his Tianfeng Pavilion art studio be maintained as the Qifeng Painting Academy. Per his request, funeral preparations were handled by his student Fan Tchunpi. A memorial service was held at the China Funeral Parlor on Haige Road (now Huashan Road), attended by artists such as Chen Shuren and Ye Gongchuo, as well as politicians such as Wang Jingwei, Cai Yuanpei, and Wu Tiecheng. Other tributes came from Sun Fo, Ju Zheng, and Zhang Ji. Gao's body was subsequently escorted by his student Zhang Kunyi to Guangdong, where he was interred at the Christian Cemetery in Henan; the national government contributed 2,000 yuan (equivalent to ¥197,000 in 2019) to cover expenses.

Zhang pushed for the state to give Gao recognition, finding support from numerous prominent politicians, including Sun Fo, Cai Yuanpei, and Yu Youren. They petitioned for Gao to be reinterred closer to the national capital in Nanjing, arguing that he deserved the recognition due to his contributions to the country as well as his artistic skill. This petition was heeded, and Gao was reinterred at Qixia Mountain on 27 December 1936. A mausoleum was erected, as was a marker bearing an inscription by then-President Lin Sen: "The Tomb of Mr. Gao Qifeng, the Sage of Painting". (Note: Original: ｢畫聖高奇峰先生之墓｣)

== Relationships ==
Gao is recognized, together with his brother Jianfu and fellow Ju Lian student Chen Shuren, as a founder of the Lingnan School of painting. All three shared similar backgrounds, and drew on Western influences in their art, believing that synthesis was necessary to preserve Chinese tradition while creating a new style of "national painting" suited for modern times. Among Gao's students were Zhang Kunyi, Zhou Yifeng, Ye Shaobing, He Qiyuan, Rong Shushi, Huang Shaoqiang, and Chao Shao-an. These students, later known as the Tianfeng Seven as they had studied at the studio, continued to spread the influence of the Lingnan School. Several of them later settled in Hong Kong and Macau, bringing the school and its teachings to these territories.

Gao had five brothers: Guiting (桂庭), Lingsheng (灵生), Guantian (冠天), Jianfu (剑父), and Jianseng (剑僧); Lingsheng had been born to Gao Boxiang's second wife. Guantian had been a partner in the Aesthetic Institute, though he was not an artist. Another brother, Jianseng, travelled to Japan in 1911, and as with Qifeng and Jianfu developed a style that blended Japanese, Western, and traditional Chinese art. He died in 1916, not having gained the same prestige.

Gao married the Suzhou-born Yang Cuixing in 1915 and had a daughter named Liandi the following year. The marriage ended in 1921 when Gao's wife took their daughter and left. Cai Dengshan attributes this to Gao's devoting himself entirely to art.

Gao had a close relationship with his student Zhang Kunyi, who has been described as his goddaughter or adopted daughter, but was also rumoured to have been his lover. (Note: Chen Jianying, writing for the Southern Metropolis Daily, suggests that they had intended to marry in 1933. At the time, cohabitation was not considered socially acceptable, and thus a premarital relationship would have been scandalous (Chen 2009).) Gao dedicated several paintings to her in the late 1920s. She, meanwhile, moved in with Gao despite being married. After he became ill, she tended to him, handled the housework, and studied art under him. Cai Dengshan writes that, after Gao's death, Zhang was so distraught that she mixed her tears with powder to paint plum blossoms, using her own blood for the sepals; he attributes this to filial piety. Gao Jianfu's student Zheng Danran recalled that the Gao brothers had a falling out, which he attributed to Qifeng's relationship with Zhang. In the 1940s, Zhang arranged for ninety of Gao's works to be brought on a touring exhibition through the United States and Canada.

== Analysis ==
=== Comparison with other Lingnan founders ===
Stylistically, Gao Qifeng had many similarities with Gao Jianfu and Chen Shuren, the other founders of the Lingnan School. All three had learned the techniques of Ju Lian, and all three had spent time in Japan learning Japanese and Western approaches to painting. Collectively, these artists sought a balance between innovation and tradition, absorbing new ideas while keeping Chinese techniques foundational. In their early years, the Gaos both drew extensively from contemporary Japanese art, with Croizier noting "strong stylistic evidence" that Gao Qifeng had attended the Japan Fine Arts Exhibition and imitated works presented therein. (Note: The brothers produced copies of several Japanese works, with Gao Qifeng's Two Water Buffaloes drawing extensively from a 1909 painting by Hikida Hoshö (Croizier 2023, pp. 38–41). The practice of copying has a lengthy history in Chinese art, being considered one of the six principles of Chinese painting. It was understood that, by imitating the works of their predecessors, artists would simultaneously preserve earlier artworks and draw from the experiences, pictorial vocabulary, and insight of acknowledged masters (Sullivan 1961, pp. 98–99). Gao Jianfu explicitly extended this principle to foreign works, arguing that the principle originally referred to the copying of Indian works that were transmitted to China together with the spread of Buddhism (Croizier 2023, p. 198).) All embraced, to varying extents, the "boneless" technique. Likewise, all produced works that combined traditional Chinese techniques with Western understandings of perspective and chiaroscuro, thereby blending romanticism and realism.

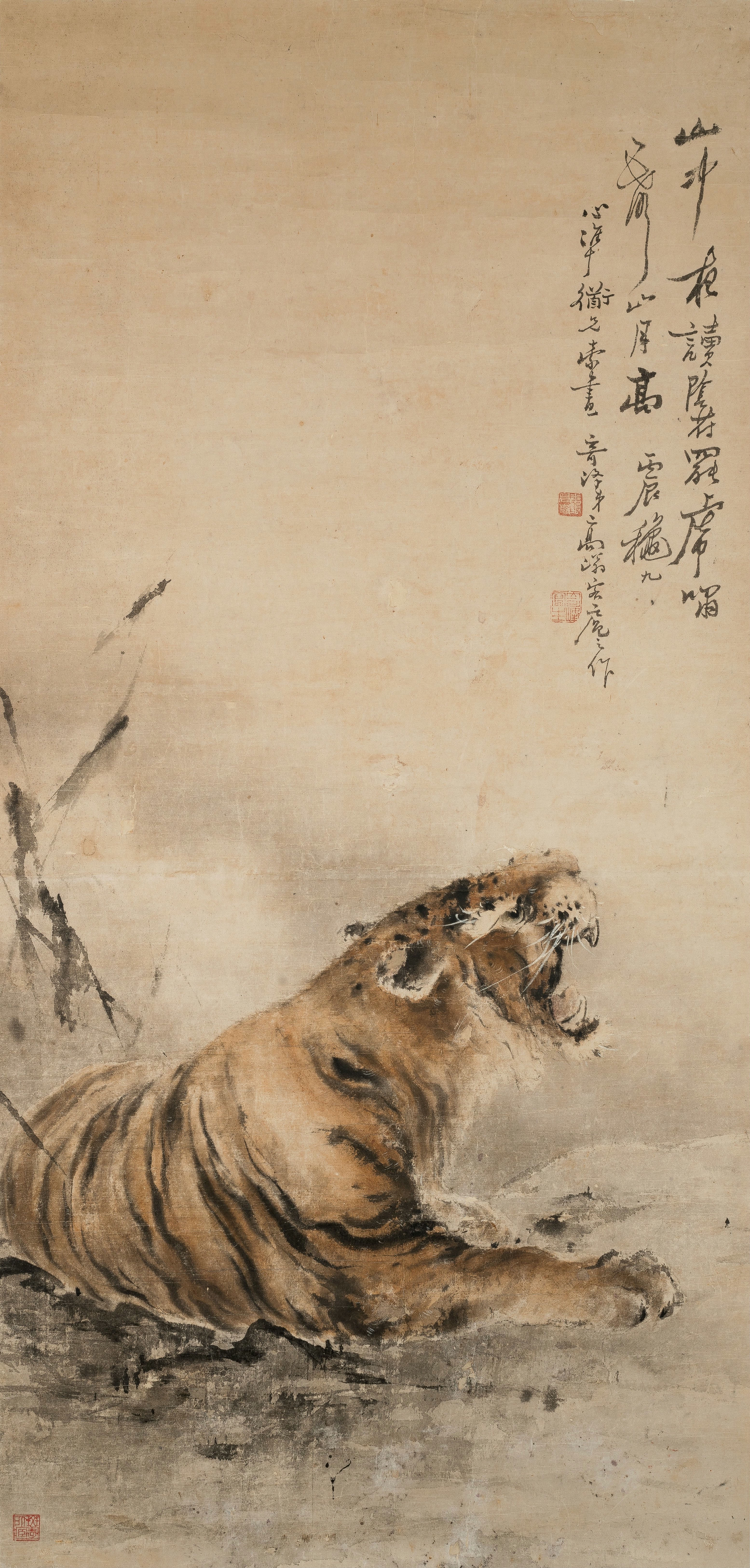
The Roar of the Night (1916); Gao has been noted for his paintings of tigers.

They also had their individual styles, with Chen remarking to Jianfu, "You partake of the strange and marvelous; I of the orthodox; Mr. Qifeng maintains a middle position." (Note: Translation by Croizier (2023, p. 117).) Cai Dengshan agrees, writing that, where Jianfu employed a majestic and innovative approach and Chen's style was dignified and elegant, Qifeng balanced the strengths of both of his peers. Similarly, Li notes that Gao blended the vigour of his brother's brushstrokes with the elegance of Chen's. Croizier writes that, of the three, Gao Qifeng was the most strongly influenced by their Japanese training, with a proclivity for broad ink washes and strong tonal contrasts reminiscent of the Shijō school. Each artist favoured different subjects, with Gao Qifeng being best known for his beasts, Gao Jianfu for his landscapes, and Chen for his bird-and-flower scenes.

Gao Qifeng's works tend to fetch higher prices than those of the other Lingnan masters. As of 2014, his most expensive painting is Lion (雄狮, 1915), which was sold by China Guardian in 2010 for 6.72 million yuan (US$993,000). At Sotheby's Hong Kong in 2004, his Four Landscape Screens (山水四屏) sold for 3.982 million Hong Kong dollars (US$511,300). That same year, Beijing Hanhai sold Gao's Pine and Monkey (松猿图) for 1.32 million yuan (US$159,000). The higher auction prices of Gao's works may be attributed, at least in part, to their relative paucity compared to those of his longer-lived peers.

=== Style ===
Regarding his approach to painting, Gao narrated:

I [...] picked out the finest points of Western art, such as the masterful strokes of the pen, composition, inking, coloring, inspiring background, poetic romance, etc. and applied them to my Chinese techniques. In short, I tried to retain what was exquisite in the Chinese art of painting, and at the same time to adopt the best methods of composition which the world's art schools had to offer, thereby blending the East and the West into a harmonious whole. (Note: Gao provided this explanation during one of his courses at Lingnan University. It is recorded in Collected Paintings by the Late Gao Qifeng (高奇峰先生遺畫集, 1935). Translation by Chu (1998, pp. 67–68))

As with his peers, Gao drew from diverse sources. His paintings show the influence of Ju Lian and his relative Chao, though not as prominently as in those of Gao Jianfu. These influences are most evident in his earliest works, which employ water infusion and the "boneless" technique while leaving the backgrounds as negative space. After his interactions with the nihonga school, Gao began to blend traditional Chinese approaches to painting with foreign ones, sketching his subjects before rendering them with ink and colour. His use of light and shadow reflects Japanese tradition, while his understandings of geometry and perspective draw from Western ones. Gao's later works employed a more freehand approach, with the paintings produced after his illness being described as direct and straightforward, with reduced narrative and little diversity in colour. According to Croizier, they appear rougher yet more intimate, with meticulous detail giving way to more spontaneous imagery.

According to Li Gongming of the Guangzhou Academy of Fine Arts, Gao favoured vigorous yet delicate brushwork and vivid images. He used these primarily to depict flora and fauna in a naturalistic manner; his depictions of eagles, lions, and tigers are particularly celebrated. Li Yuzhong suggests that Gao's angry lions and roaring tigers evoke a "bold and unyielding spirit", (Note: Original: ｢了豪放不屈的气魄｣) while Sun Yat-sen deemed his depictions of animals to reflect a revolutionary spirit. Croizier describes Gao as the Lingnan School's premiere painter of tigers, employing a painstaking realism that implies a deep absorption of Meiji-era techniques, though he also showed great skill with large birds.

Landscapes and figures are also attested in Gao's oeuvre. Several works depict moonlit nights and winter snows, which Cai Dengshan describes as often having a "delicate, graceful, crystal clear, and clean charm". (Note: Original: ｢景物常有一种清丽秀润、晶莹光洁的意韵｣) However, pure landscapes are rare, as Gao's images of trees – some of which were completed with the assistance of his brother – and riverbanks are used as settings for animal subjects. "Boneless" colour washes are common in these works. His figures, meanwhile, are mostly religious, and include holy figures such as Bodhidharma, though a portrait of the poet Li Bai after Liang Kai is known.

== Gallery ==
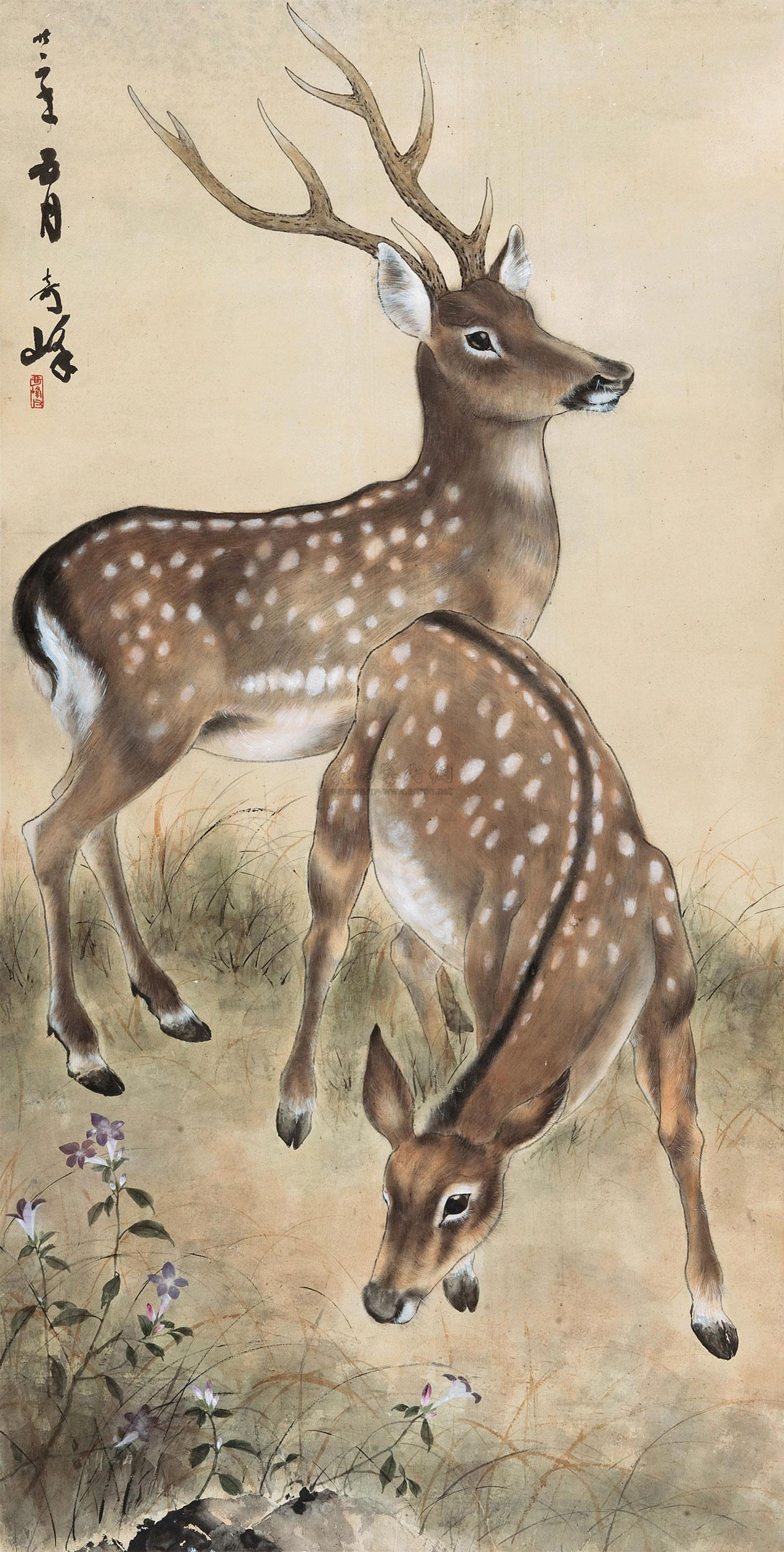
Deer (undated)

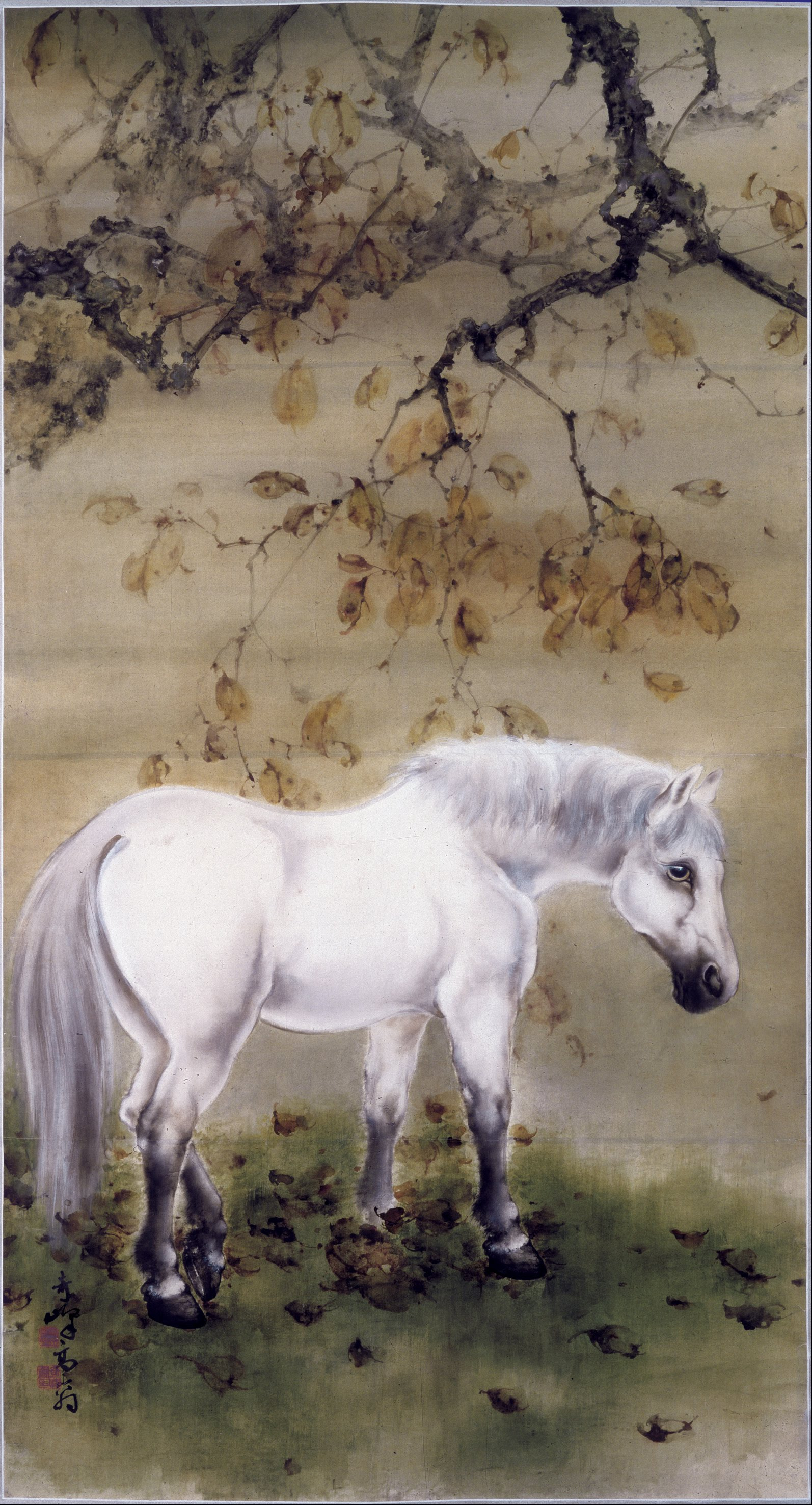
White Horse (undated)

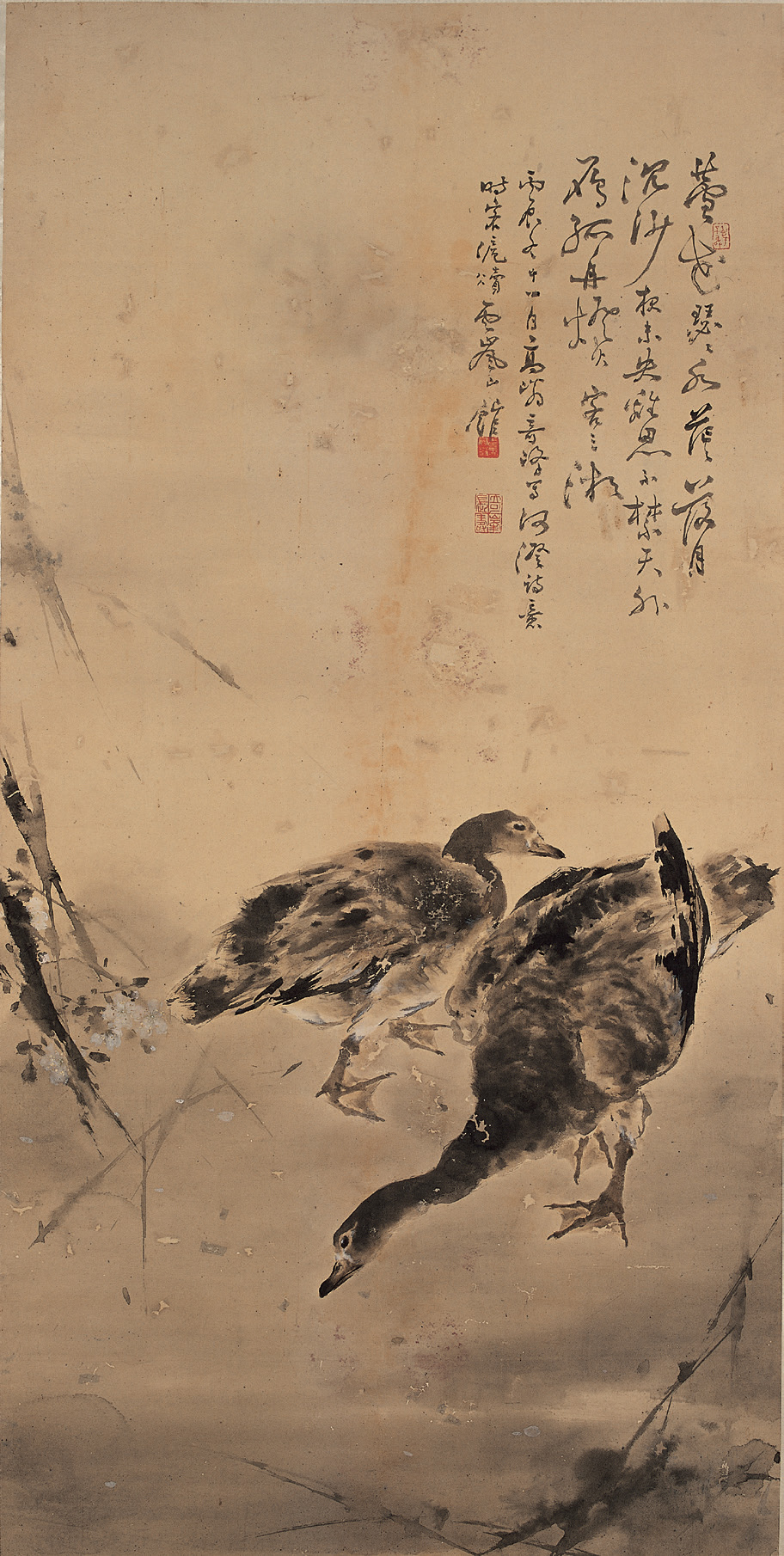
Two Geese in Reed Fields (1916)

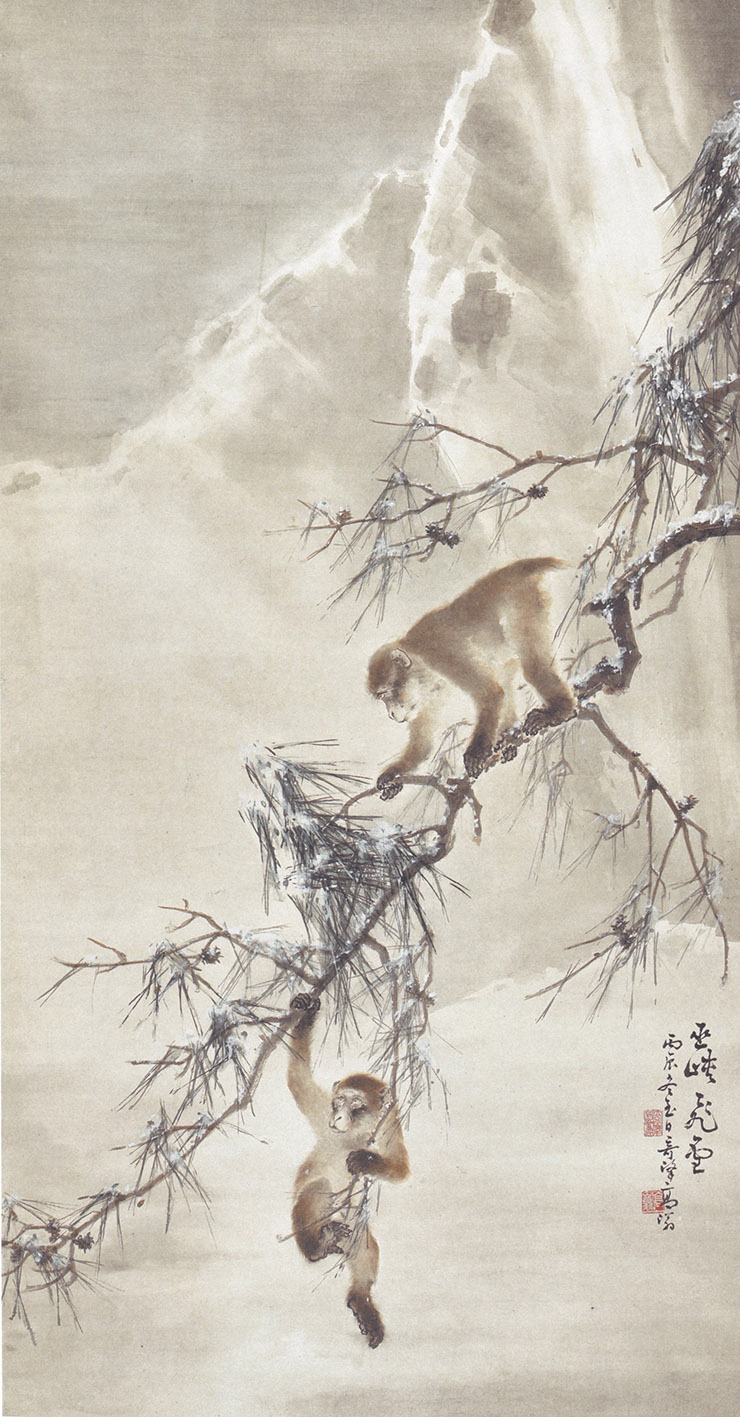
Snow in the Wu Ravine (1916)

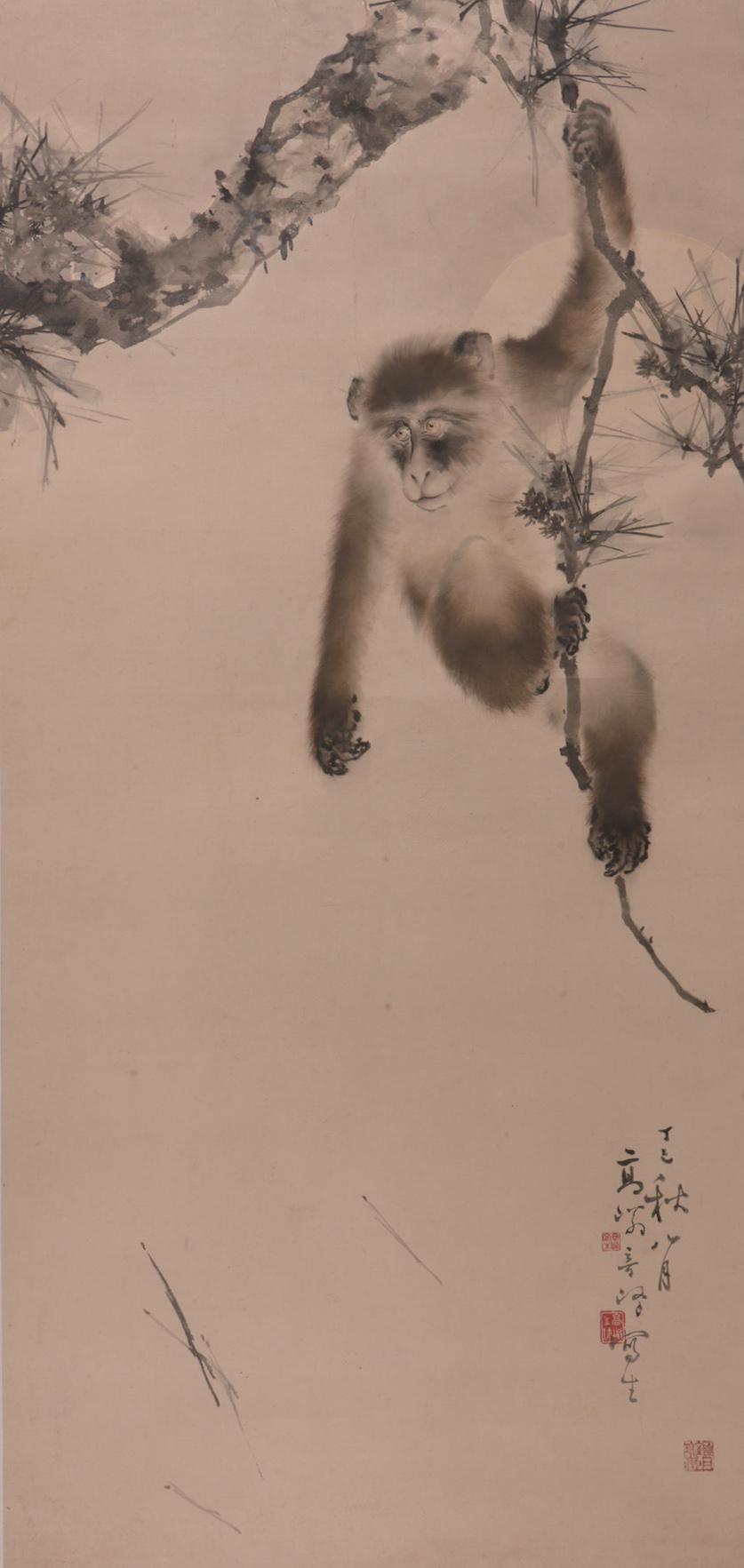
Monkey on a Pine Tree (1917)

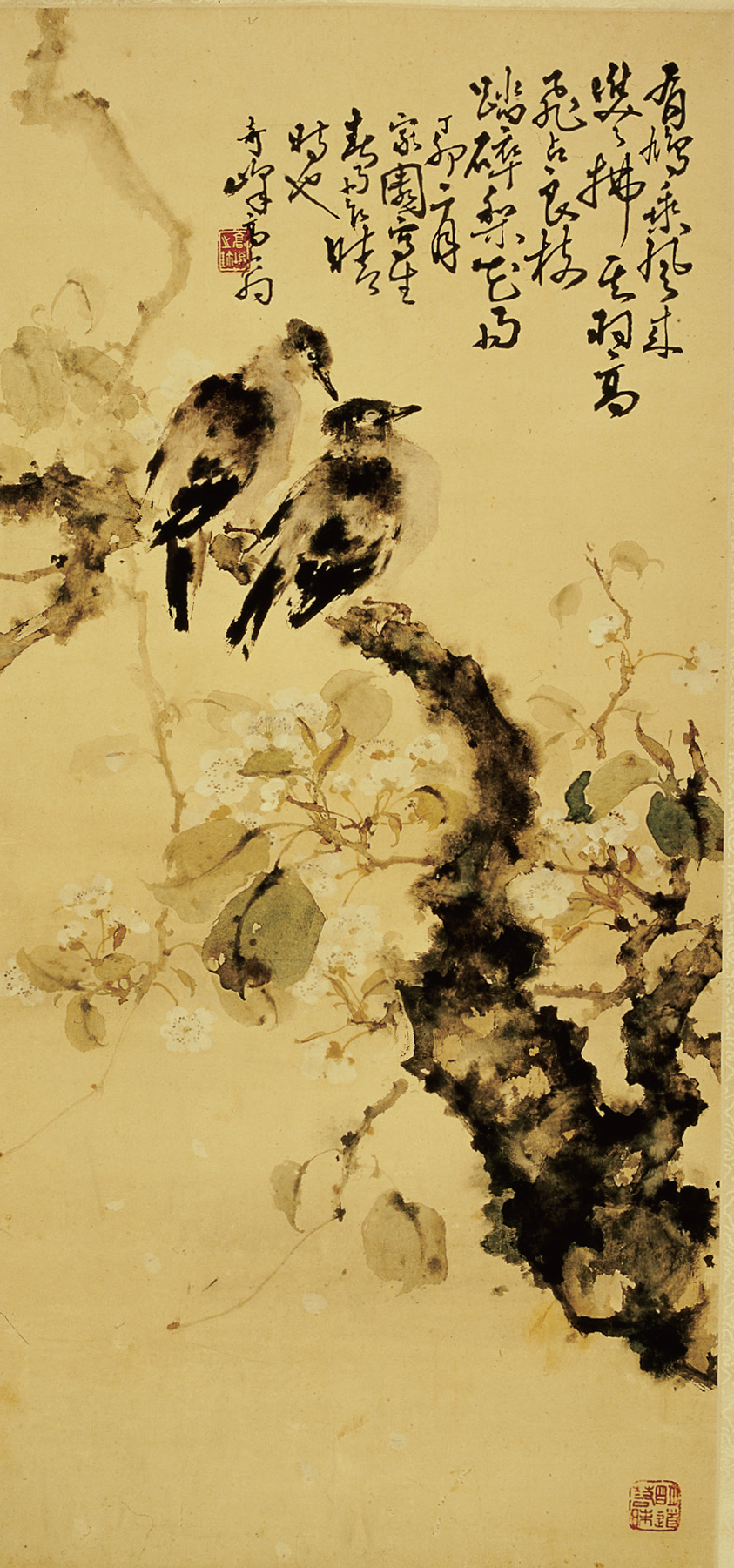
Pear Blossoms and Two Doves (1927)

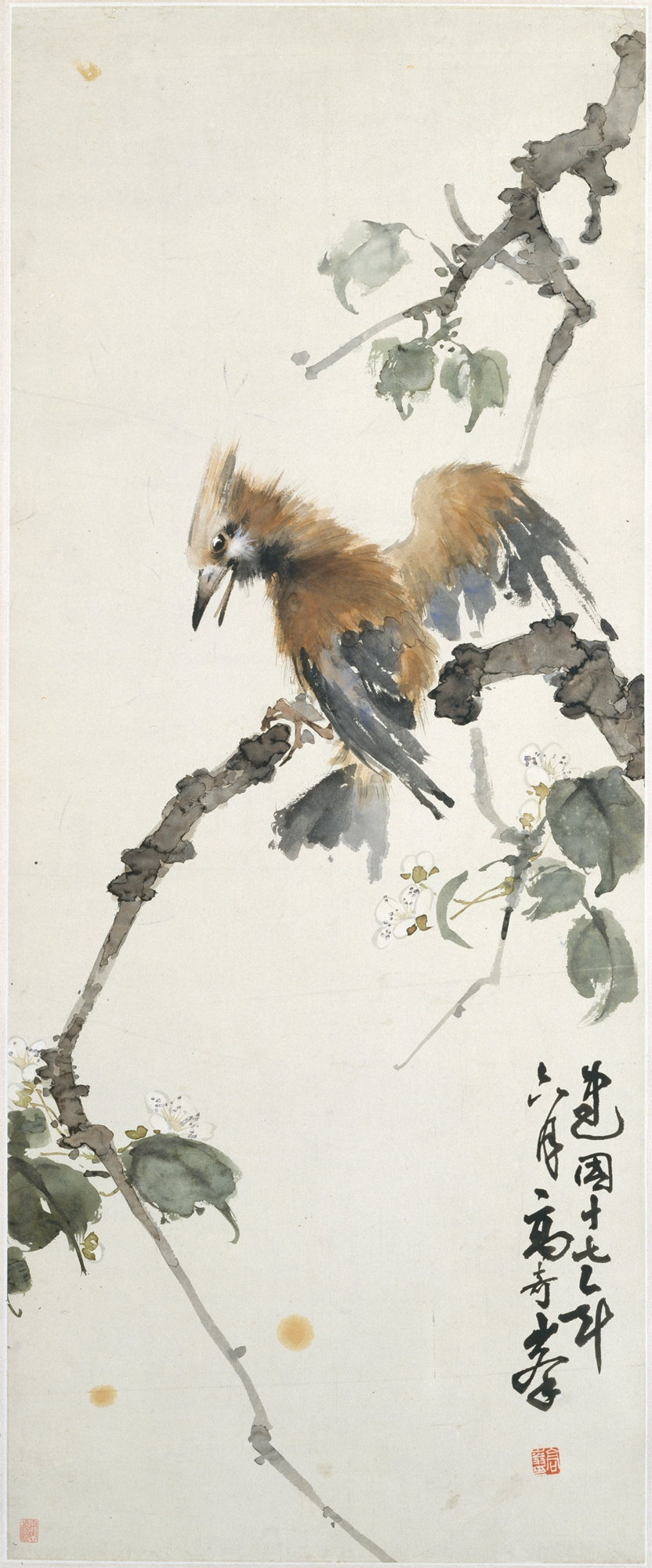
Woodpecker (1927)

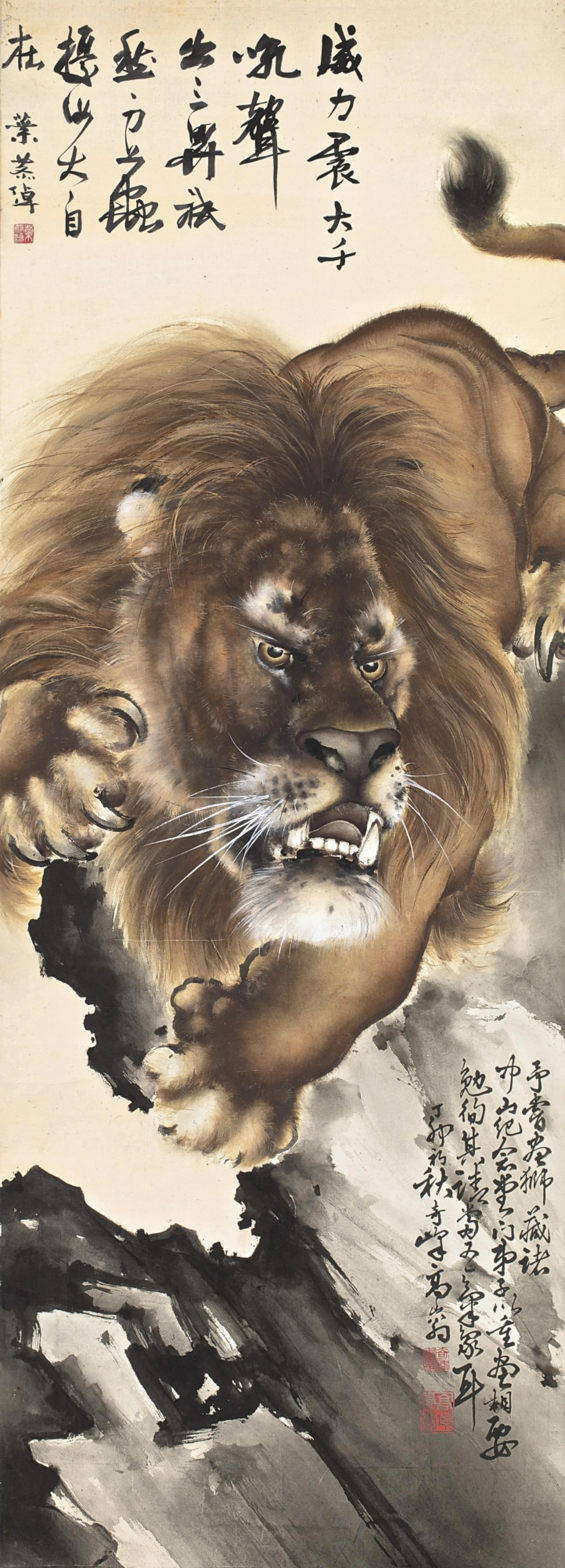
Angry Lion (1927)

== Works cited ==
- 【广东美术百年21大家】高奇峰 [21 Fine Arts Masters from Guangdong in the Past 100 Years: Gao Qifeng] (in Chinese). Guangdong Museum. 24 September 2017. Archived from the original on 3 December 2023.
- Andrews, Julia F. (1994). Painters and Politics in the People's Republic of China, 1949–1979. Berkeley: University of California Press. ISBN 978-0-520-07981-6.
- Andrews, Julia F.; Shen, Kuiyi (2012). The Art of Modern China. Berkeley: University of California Press. ISBN 978-0-520-23814-5.
- Au, Ho-nien. 畫家介紹─高奇峰先生簡介 [Introduction to the Painters: Gao Qifeng] (in Chinese). Lingnan Fine Arts Museum. Archived from the original on 15 July 2024.
- "Biographical Notes". The Art of Gao Qifeng. Hong Kong: Urban Council. 1981. pp. 20–24. ISBN 978-962-215-040-9.
- Cai Dengshan (蔡登山) (25 August 2023). 番禺高奇峰：未尽其才的"岭南三杰 [Panyu Gao Qifeng: The "Three Heroes of Lingnan" Who Did Not Use His Talents to Their Fullest]. Dute News (in Chinese). Shenzhen Media Group.
- Chen Jianying (陈坚盈) (6 April 2009). 张坤仪（1892-1969） 她的一生只为奇峰而画 [Zhang Kunyi (1892–1969) She only Painted for Qifeng in Her Life]. Southern Metropolis Daily (in Chinese). Archived from the original on 18 January 2024 – via Guangzhou Digital Library.
- Chu, Christina (1981). "The Art of Gao Qifeng: An Investigation of Historical Background and Stylistic Development". The Art of Gao Qifeng. Hong Kong: Urban Council. pp. 6–12. ISBN 978-962-215-040-9.
- Chu, Christina (1998). "The Lingnan School and Its Followers: Radical Innovation in Southern China". In Andrews, Julia Frances; Shen, Kuiyi (eds.). A Century in Crisis: Modernity and Tradition in the Art of Twentieth-century China. New York: Guggenheim Museum. pp. 40–79. ISBN 978-0-8109-6909-4. Archived from the original on 18 September 2024.
- Croizier, Ralph (2023). Art and Revolution in Modern China: The Lingnan (Cantonese) School of Painting, 1906–1951. Berkeley: University of California Press. ISBN 978-0-520-33696-4. Archived from the original on 9 October 2024.
- Croizier, Ralph; Liang, Tian S. (2022). Liang, Tian S. (ed.). "Lingnan School". Grove Art Online. doi:10.1093/gao/9781884446054.article.T051207. ISBN 978-1-884446-05-4.
- Floriani, Giulia Pra (2023). "Photographic Portraits of Leaders of the 1911 Revolution: The Promise of Historical Rupture in the Chinese Republican Press". In Satterthwaite, Tim; Thacker, Andrew (eds.). Magazines and Modern Identities: Global Cultures of the Illustrated Press, 1880–1945. London: Bloomsbury. ISBN 978-1-350-27865-3. Archived from the original on 8 October 2024.
- Gu, Yi (2013). "What's in a Name? Photography and the Reinvention of Visual Truth in China, 1840–1911". The Art Bulletin. 95: 120–138. doi:10.1080/00043079.2013.10786109.
- Liang, Tian S. (2022). "Gao Qifeng". Grove Art Online. doi:10.1093/oao/9781884446054.013.90000138521. ISBN 978-1-884446-05-4. Archived from the original on 9 June 2024.
- Liang, Tian S. (2022). "Zhenxiang Huabao" [The True Record]. Grove Art Online. doi:10.1093/oao/9781884446054.013.90000138520. ISBN 978-1-884446-05-4. Archived from the original on 3 June 2024.
- Lu Youzhe (吕友者) (6 May 2014). 岭南画派的艺术及市场 [The Art Market of the Lingnan School]. Oriental Collection (in Chinese). Archived from the original on 1 October 2024 – via Sina.com.
- Su, Stephanie (2021). "Exhibition as Art Historical Space: The 1933 Chinese Art Exhibition in Paris". The Art Bulletin. 103 (3): 125–148. doi:10.1080/00043079.2021.1882808.
- Sullivan, Michael (1961). An Introduction to Chinese Art. Berkeley: University of California Press. OCLC 1069809.
- Sullivan, Michael (1996). Art and Artists of Twentieth-Century China. Berkeley: University of California Press. ISBN 978-0-520-07556-6.
- "The Heavenly Breeze: Selected Works of Gao Qifeng and His Disciples". Hong Kong Heritage Museum. Archived from the original on 17 September 2024.
- Wang Jingjing (汪晶晶) (6 November 2008). 高奇峰 谁堪画圣之名 谁享最风光葬礼 [Gao Qifeng: Who Deserves the Title of the 'Painting Saint', Who has the Most Splendid Funeral]. Southern Metropolis Daily (in Chinese). Archived from the original on 5 January 2024 – via Guangzhou Digital Library.
- Yin, Tongyun (2013). "From Painter to Artist: Representing Guohua Paintings and Painters in Liangyou, 1926–1938". In Pickowicz, Paul; Shen, Kuiyi; Zhang, Yingjin (eds.). Liangyou, Kaleidoscopic Modernity and the Shanghai Global Metropolis, 1926–1945. Leiden: Brill. pp. 227–247. ISBN 978-90-04-26338-3. Archived from the original on 17 September 2024.
- Zhu Wanzhang (朱万章) (31 July 2017). 高奇峰《松猿图》：画海横舟 劈波至勇 [Gao Qifeng's "Pine and Monkey": Painting a Boat Crossing the Sea and Bravely Cutting through the Waves]. rmzxb.com.cn (in Chinese). Chinese People's Political Consultative Conference. Archived from the original on 16 March 2021.
