= Kunyi =

Kunyi may refer to:

- Kunyi language, a Bantu language spoken in the Republic of the Congo
- Liu Kunyi (1830–1902), Chinese official
- Zhang Kunyi (1985–1969), Chinese artist
