= Huang Shaoqiang =

Chinese artist (1901–1942)

- 黃少強
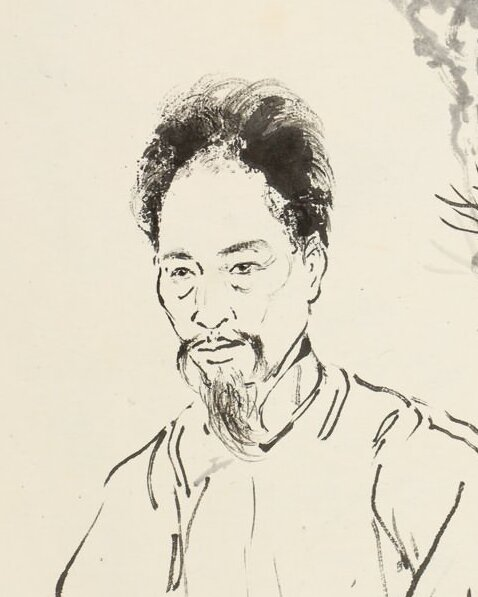
- Self-Portrait (undated, detail)
- Born: Huang Yishi; 1901; Xiaojiang Village, Guangdong, Qing dynasty
- Died: 7 September 1942 (aged 40–41); Xiaojiang Village, Guangdong, Republic of China
- Movement: Lingnan School

Chinese name
- Traditional Chinese: 黃少強
- Simplified Chinese: 黄少强
Transcriptions
Standard Mandarin
- Hanyu Pinyin: Huáng Shǎoqiáng
- Wade–Giles: Huang2 Shao3-ch'iang2
Yue: Cantonese
- Jyutping: wong4 siu? koeng?

Huang Shaoqiang (Chinese: 黃少強; pinyin: Huáng Shǎoqiáng, 1901 – 7 September 1942) was a Chinese artist of the Lingnan School. The grandson of a village official, he learned poetry, calligraphy, and art from a young age. He studied at the Bowen Art School and was a pupil of Gao Qifeng and Gao Jianfu, who taught a blend of Western and Chinese painting. After graduating, he became an educator while developing his own career as an artist, holding his first solo exhibition in 1926. Following the Japanese invasion of Manchuria, Huang raised funds for the war effort. He travelled China for several years, settling in Guangzhou by 1935. As Japanese forces moved southward, he fled to British Hong Kong briefly before ultimately returning to his hometown in Guangdong. Sickly, he died at his ancestral home.

Differing from his teachers, Huang favoured depictions of the human figure. His early works showed the influence of Japanese painting, with broad swathes of colour and a sense of three-dimensionality, while later works were marked by rougher linework that nonetheless reflected Western approaches to modelling. His works mostly portray everyday situations, highlighting the suffering of the common person, though some depict religious subjects. Death is a prevalent theme in his paintings. During his lifetime, Huang held some eighty-five exhibitions; numerous retrospectives have followed since his death.

== Biography ==
=== Early life ===
Huang was born Huang Yishi (黃宜仕) in Xiaojiang Village, Guanyao, Nanhai, Guangdong, in 1901. The grandson of Huang Jie, a village official, Huang received an education from a young age. He read poetry and other works of literature, practised calligraphy, and was exposed to famed works of art – including works from Europe. Although his grandfather wanted him to go into administration, Huang preferred art. In 1911, as he was processing the Xinhai Revolution, he painted No One to Tell (无告人), which Zhong Lin of the Nan Fang Daily describes as Huang's first mature work.

In 1920, Huang – who took the courtesy name Shaoqiang in adulthood – enrolled at the Bowen Art School, seeking to learn painting from the United States–trained artist Liu Bowen. He also studied under Gao Qifeng before apprenticing under Gao Jianfu. The Gao brothers were two of the founders of the Lingnan School of painting, which blended Western styles with traditional Chinese art. Huang thus learned to combine western approaches to modelling with traditional ink- and brushwork, though unlike his teachers Huang often depicted human figures. At some point, Huang spent time learning from Liu Haisu at the Shanghai Academy of Fine Arts (now part of Shanghai University). Through 1926, he illustrated the Foshan Athletic Monthly, a publication of the Jingwu Athletic Association's Foshan branch, and contributed several articles dealing with art theory.

=== Artistic career ===
Having completed his studies at the Bowen School in 1924, Huang entered the field of education. In 1925, he began to teach painting for the Foshan Jingwu Association; he also taught the subject at several local schools. With fellow Lingnan School painter Chao Shao-an, he also established an art garden to teach painting to youths. He was hired by the Foshan Academy of Fine Arts, which had been established by Gao Jianfu, in 1926. Several members of Huang's family died in the 1920s, including his grandfather, father, mother, and multiple siblings; he dealt with the sense of loss through his art.

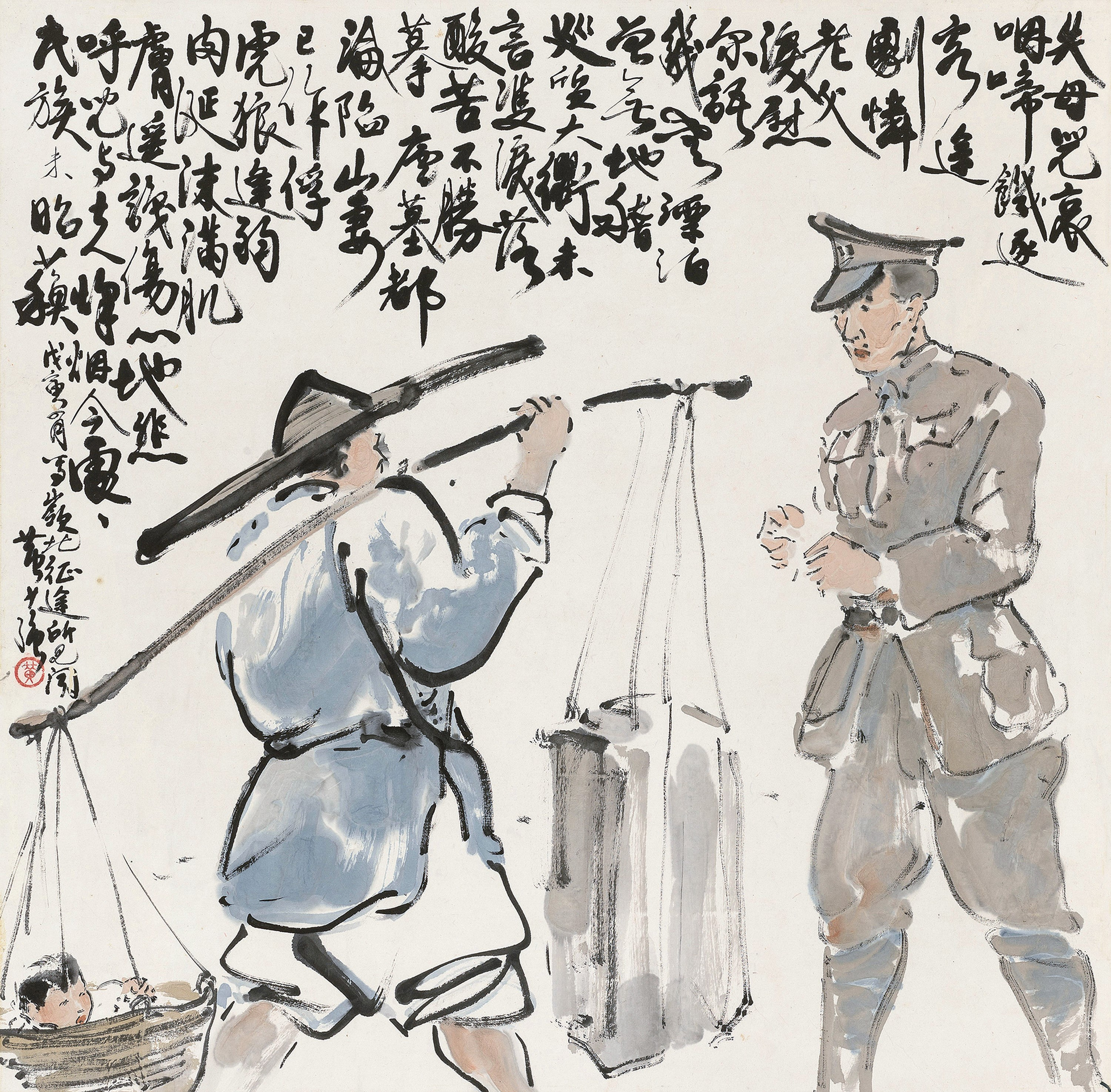
Huang organized fundraising exhibitions following the Japanese invasion of Manchuria (Hunger, 1938)

Huang held his first solo exhibition in Foshan in 1926. Containing some 160 works, the exhibition was held by the Foshan Jingwu Society and divided thematically into five sections. Over subsequent years, he participated in numerous solo and joint exhibitions. For example, two paintings by Huang, Dust on an Empty Bed (尘榻空留) and Self-Admiration in Despair (穷途自赏), were exhibited at the First National Art Exhibition in 1929; these were the only recent works exhibited therein. His painting Sad String (哀弦) was sent for display in Berlin as part of an exhibition of Chinese art in 1933, then brought to London for further showings.

Following the 1931 Japanese invasion of Manchuria, Huang contributed his Floods and Refugees (洪水图流民图) to the National Disaster Painting Exhibition (1932) in Guangzhou. (Note: According to Lam (2018, p. 206), this painting – since lost – "was arguably the first large-scale figural composition in ink and brush to receive nation-wide attention in twentieth-century China".) He took first place in the exhibition, sold the work, and donated the proceeds to support the war effort. In 1934, he and several other artists organized another exhibition, with proceeds donated to support the fight against the Japanese. (Note: This included Huang's Hardships and Sufferings of the People, a now-lost painting that depicted three families of varying socio-economic statuses dealing with a drought. The work was nationally recognized, and Huang later donated it to Chairman Lin Sen (Lam 2018, p. 211).) Outside of exhibitions, he organized students to spread anti-Japanese propaganda. He also produced several works that denounced the invasion, including Daughter of Resistance (抵抗之女) and National Soul Rising at the Yalu River (鸭绿江头起国魂). At one point, he travelled to Hunan to comfort soldiers fighting the Japanese.

Huang developed a reputation as a maverick, one isolated from the world, and took the public persona of a tortured artist. At the same time, he argued against the elitist idea that artists are more inspired than others. He frequently associated with other artists, including fellow Lingnan School painters He Qiyuan, Chao Shao-an, and Ye Shaobing. In the early 1930s, Huang travelled China, making stops in Guangxi, Jiangsu, Zhejiang, Shandong, and Shanxi, where he observed the experiences of the common people. As he travelled, he also interacted with his peers. During his sojourn, he met Qi Baishi, Lin Fengmian, Huang Binhong, and Xu Beihong.

In 1935, Huang returned to Guangzhou. He established the People's Atelier at his home on Tongning Road, where he continued to educate young painters; ultimately, the students held six joint exhibitions. He also wrote about art, producing several texts, including a compilation of poetry from his works. Outside the gallery, Huang taught at the Nanhai Normal School until 1936, when he was hired by Li Jinfa to teach painting at the Guangzhou Municipal School of Fine Arts. With the fall of Guangzhou in 1938, Huang fled to British Hong Kong.

=== Later years and death ===
In Hong Kong, Huang organized more art exhibitions to raise money for the campaign against the Japanese, and produced multiple works – such as No Looking Back (不堪回首) and A National Disaster Too Terrible for Words (罄竹难书国难惨) – depicting the suffering that accompanied the occupation. With fellow artists Ye Shaobing and He Jiafang, he established the Sui Han Society. Working with other artists, he also established an art school in the city, serving as its director.

When Hong Kong fell to the Japanese, Huang returned to Guangzhou briefly before travelling to Foshan. There, he continued to paint, while also mentoring young artists such as Pan He. At his Zhilu Painting School in Donghuali, as in his earlier educational roles, Huang urged his students to paint based on their observations in the field, rather than isolated in the studio. Pan recalled that, during this period, Huang would follow his subjects on the streets, sketching them; this resulted in many subjects being depicted from behind.

Huang refused to acquiesce to the Japanese and was unwilling to join the Japan-established South China Arts Association; when asked to do so by fellow Lingnan painter He Qiyuan, he sent a written response rather than deliver his answer in person. He was detained in 1942, and though released, he became sickly. With little money available, he lived for a time with his mother-in-law, before departing for Xiaojiang Village in May. Huang was robbed on the road, further affecting his health. Ultimately, he died in his ancestral home on 7 September 1942.

== Family and legacy ==
Huang married Chen Huanqing in 1918; she was also a painter, and taught at the Foshan Ladies Painting Association. The couple had four sons and several daughters. Huang's family have donated more than four hundred of his works to various museums, hoping to ensure their safekeeping and spread knowledge of his oeuvre. Huang also taught numerous artists, both at schools and in private. These included the sculptor Pan He, as well as the painters Chen Ningdan, Huang Zhijian, and Tan Yong. From 1935, the People's Atelier held annual exhibitions to display the works of Huang's students; examples included Rong Jingduo's They Who Struggle to Save Food for Three Days (役役誰儲三日糧) and Liang Rui's Dreaming of the Son's Future Repayment (他年反哺徒空想). Pan He identified Huang as his greatest artistic influence, holding that his mentor's approach to art – viewing it not as a means of earning money, but as a means of serving the people – had influenced his own paradigm.

Writing for the Foshan Museum, Li Xiaoqing notes that Huang participated in some eighty-five exhibitions in his lifetime, with international showings in Belgium, France, Germany, Russia, and the United Kingdom. These exhibitions gained the support of prominent politicians and artists, with a 1935 catalogue of his paintings containing notes from Chairman Lin Sen, Premier Wang Jingwei, and President of the Examination Yuan Dai Jitao, as well as the essayist Hu Shih and painter Xu Beihong. Numerous retrospectives on Huang and his work have been held, including an exhibition of more than one hundred paintings, as well as related poetry, photographs, and other media, at the Guangdong Museum of Art in 1999. The Huang Shaoqiang Memorial Hall, located in Nanhai, contains numerous works by Huang, donated by his family. The Foshan Municipal Government has published several compilations of Huang's writings, and in 2006 a catalogue of his oeuvre was issued to commemorate the 105th anniversary of his birth.

== Style and analysis ==
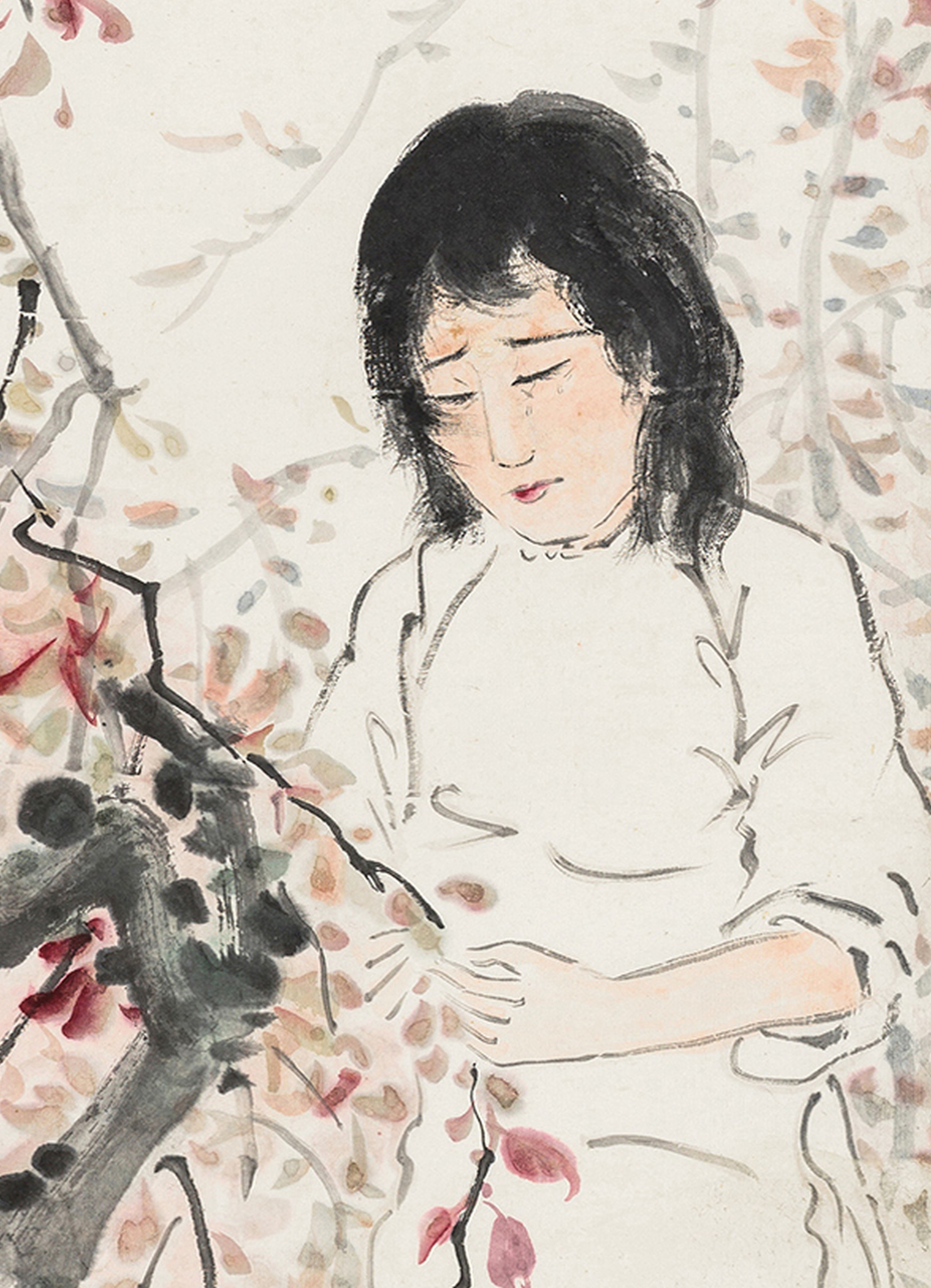
Sorrow was a common theme in Huang's work (Lady, undated, detail)

Huang, who was known professionally by the art name Zhilu (止庐), (Note: Lam (2018, p. 197) translates this as "hut of stillness".) sought to capture modern situations by using traditional Chinese approaches to painting. His early works show the influences of Japanese painting, something that he likely inherited from the Gao brothers; Gao Jianfu had been close to Takeuchi Seihō in his early years. These paintings were characterized by broad swathes of colour, as well as a sense of three-dimensionality. Later works abandon the influence of wood-block printing. They use less colour, with rougher linework that nonetheless reflects the approaches to modelling used in Western art. Often Huang's works are accompanied by poetry, some quite lengthy. Zhong Lin describes him as having "brought the fundamental and representative line of traditional Chinese painting to its fullest potential", (Note: Original: 「将传统中国画中最根本、最具代表性的线条的作用发挥到极致」.) and the art scholar Ka Ming Kevin Lam deems Huang as groundbreaking in his struggle "to create a new figure painting according to [his] understanding of modern art".

Huang specialized in figure painting; along with Fang Rending, he was one of only two members of the Lingnan School with such a focus. Huang's art deals primarily with Chinese subjects, often everyday situations and people. Attested in his works are beggars, craftsmen, peasants, peddlers, street performers, and tea house servants; such everyday figures were frequently depicted in contemporary approaches to bring art to the people. Consequently, Ye Shuming of the e-zine Yang Cheng describes Huang's paintings as imbued with a humanitarian spirit, taking a critical realist approach to highlighting their suffering while condemning the excesses of luxury. Liu Haisu uses these works to highlight art's transformation from a media of the wealthy to something belonging to the masses. Some of Huang's works had religious themes, and several depict arhats (persons who have achieved nirvana) or the Bodhisattva of compassion, Guanyin.

Death and suffering are common themes in Huang's works, such that three of his four submissions to the First National Art Exhibition in 1929 dealt with them. Wei Chenghong of the Lingnan School of Painting Memorial Hall links such themes' prevalence with the successive deaths of several family members and the "inescapable nightmare" and "irresistible magic" of Huang's resulting fear of death. (Note: Original: 「无法摆脱的梦魇」 and 「可抗拒的魔力」.) Huang was aware of this tendency, viewing himself as "writing the sorrow of the country and the suffering of the people". (Note: Original: 「谱家国之哀愁，写民间之疾苦」.) The curator Chen Ji argues that Huang was able to "surpass traditional Chinese figure painting not only in form, but also in spirit, speaking directly to the ontology of modern art and completing the transformation of his figure painting into modern meaning" through his explorations of sorrow and human suffering. (Note: Original: 「黄少强的人物画不惟在形式上，而且在精神上超越了传统的中国人物画，直指现代艺术的本体，并完成了他的人物画向现代意义上的转变」.)

Lam argues that Huang's innovations have been overlooked due to the historical emphasis on his depictions of the "ills and hardships of the people". He notes, for instance, that Huang produced several works – including Floods and Refugees – that combined four to six hanging scrolls to produce large-scale works with little parallel in earlier Chinese works. Huang also experimented with nudes, using the naked female figure not to portray beauty but to highlight violence. His themes at times departed from Chinese tradition. This included motherhood, with obstructed labour portrayed through two works completed shortly after his mother's death, as well as a detailed portrayal of one of his exhibitions. (Note: Titled Appreciating the Tune (賞音), this painting depicted a potentially imagined exhibition of seven of Huang's paintings, complete with three viewers. The work has been partially lost, with only four of its six scrolls surviving (Lam 2018, pp. 220–222).)

== Gallery ==
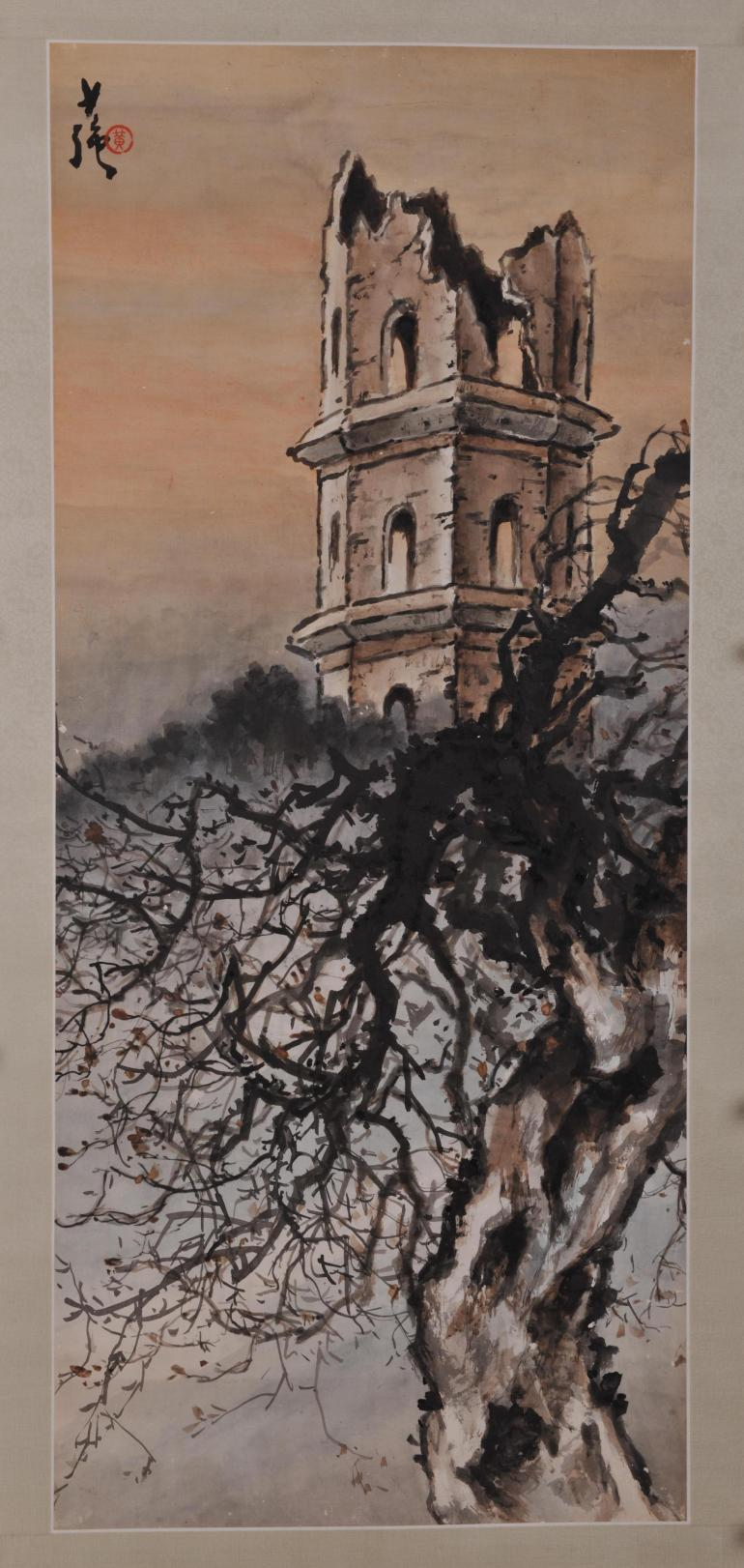
Broken Pagoda in Autumn (1926)

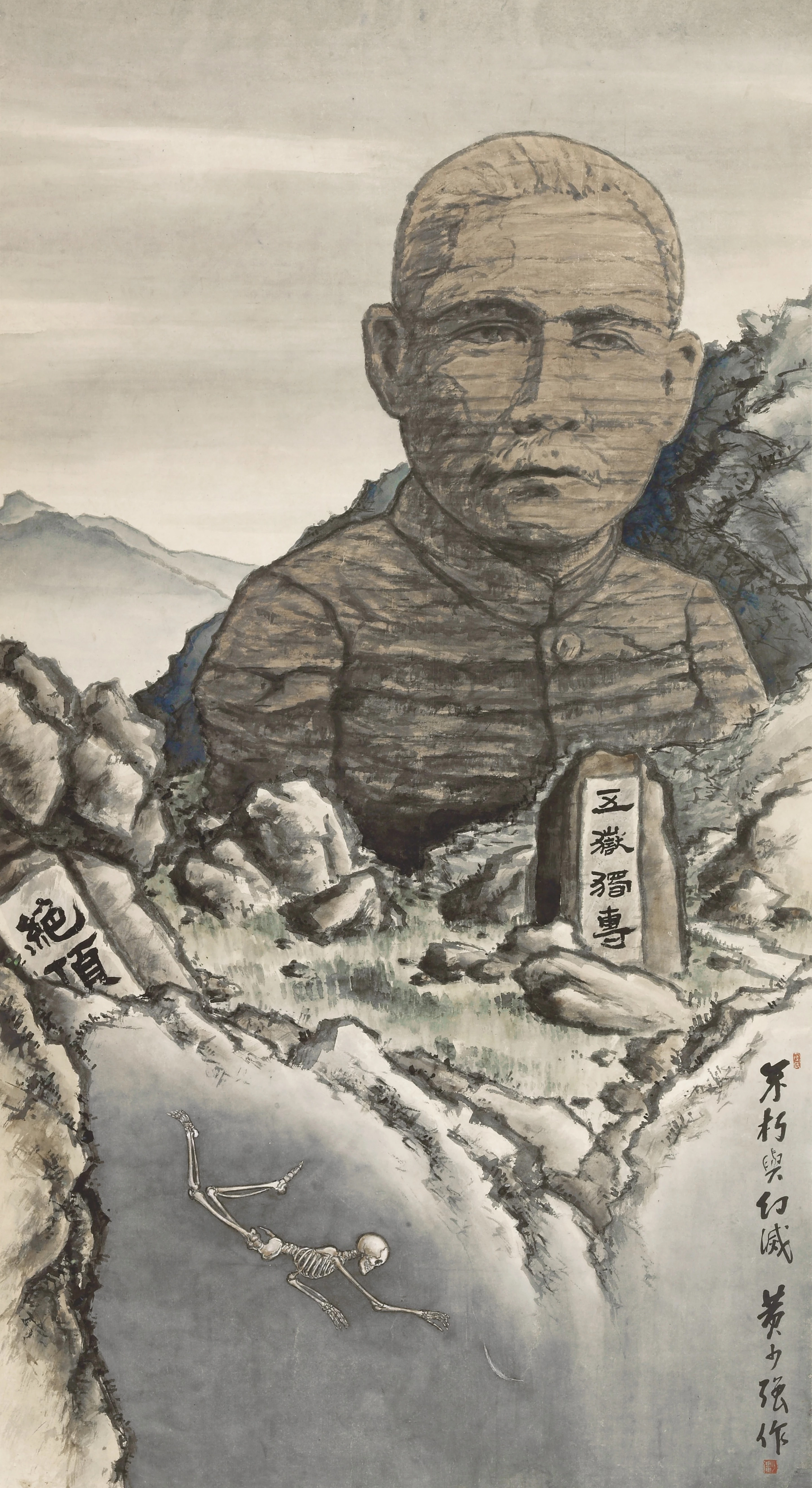
Immortality and Oblivion (1928)

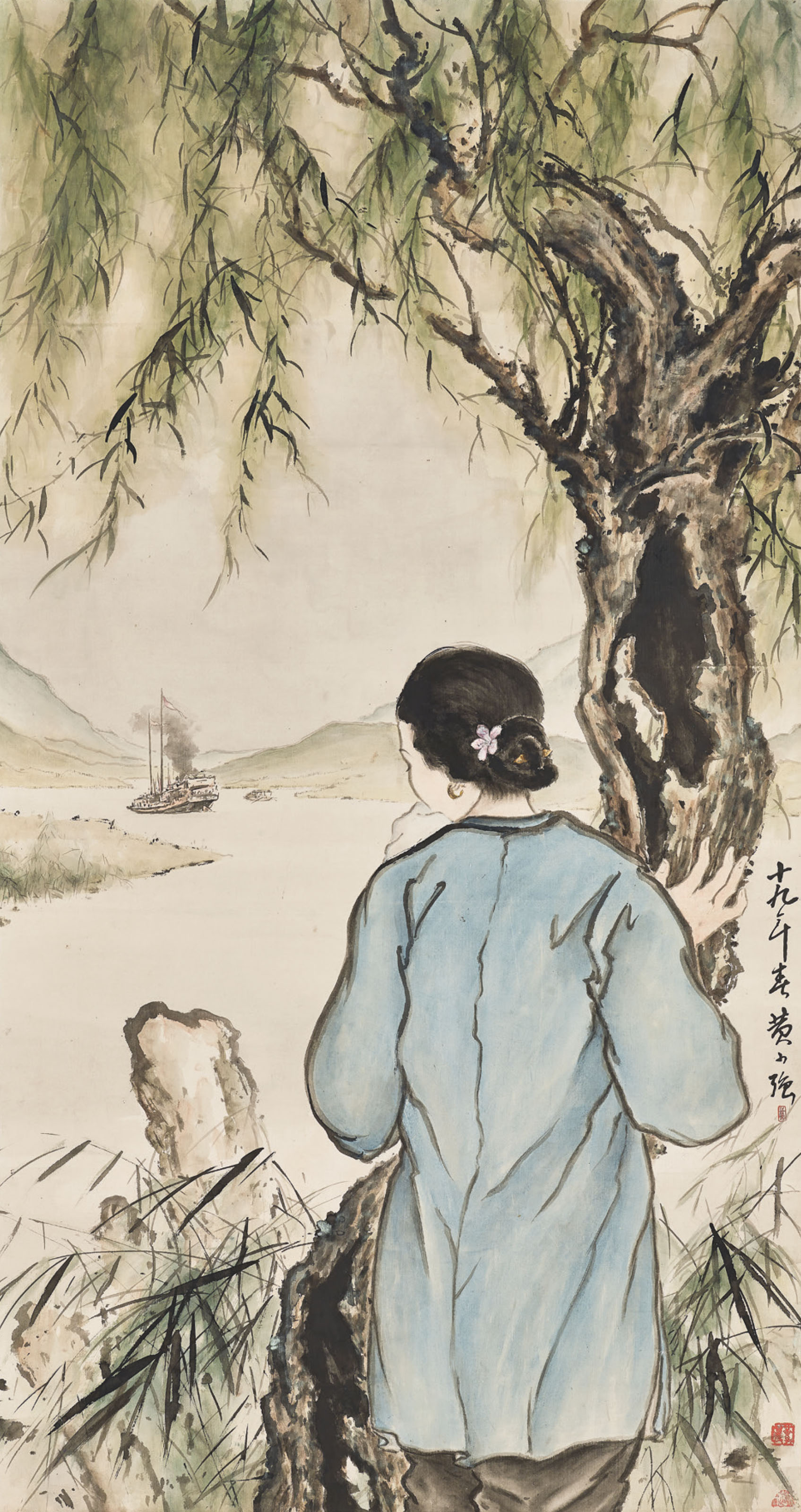
Farewell (1930)

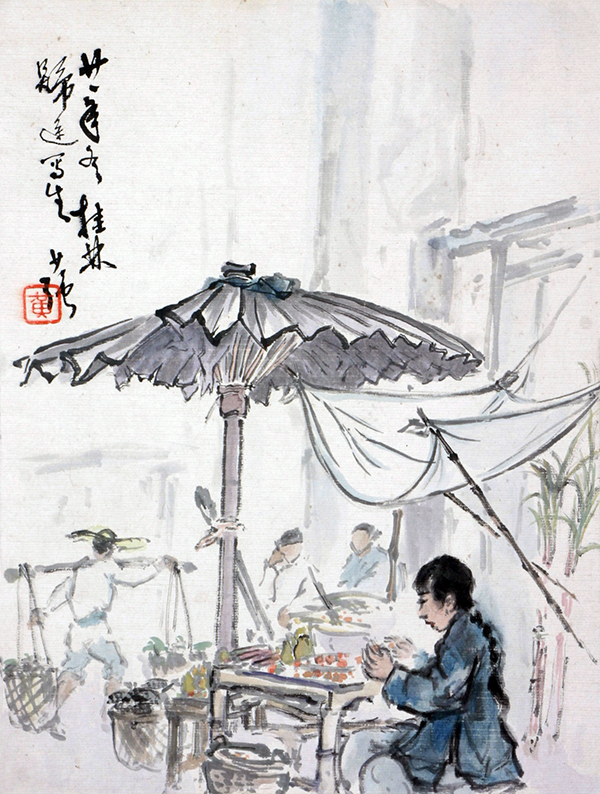
Sketching Guilin on the Way Home (1931)

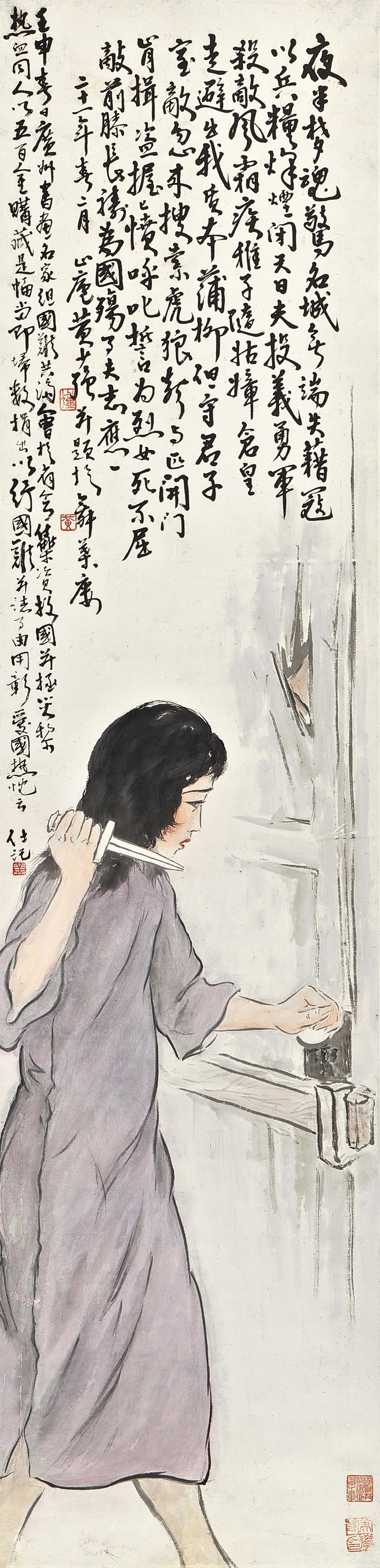
Martyr (1932)

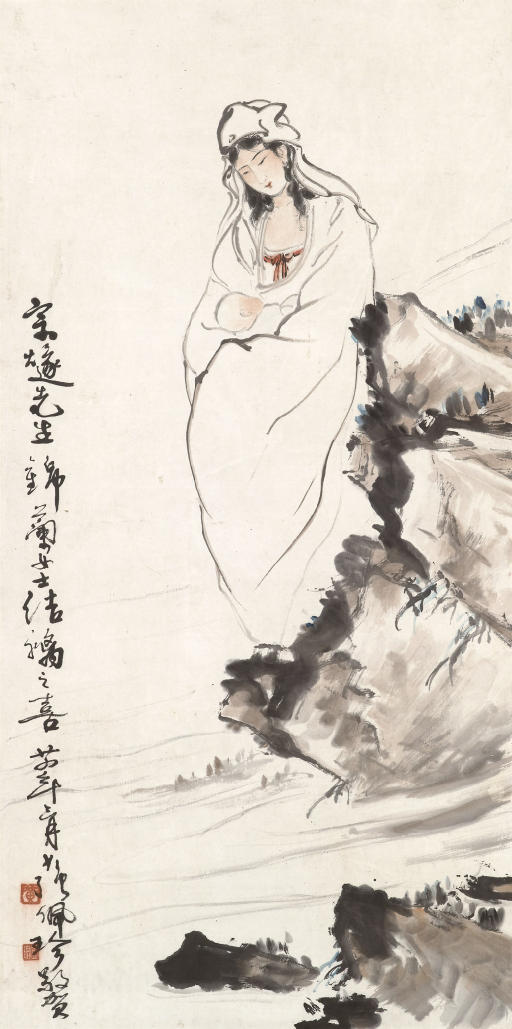
Guanyin with Child (1935)

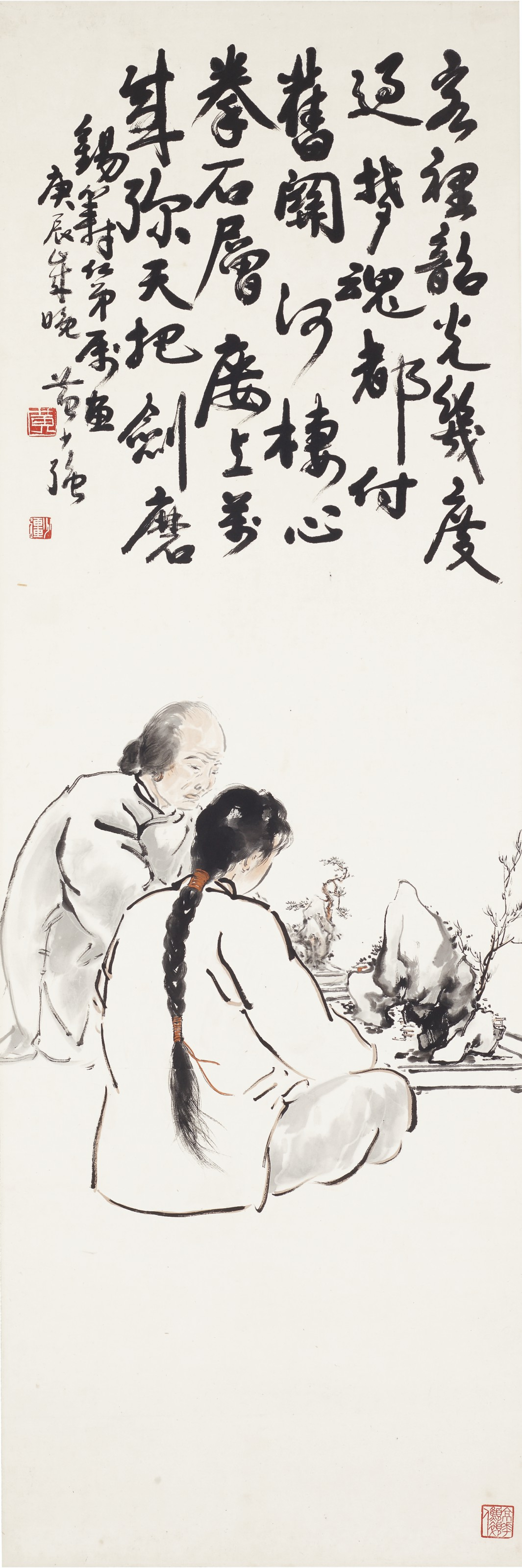
Correction of Youth (1940)

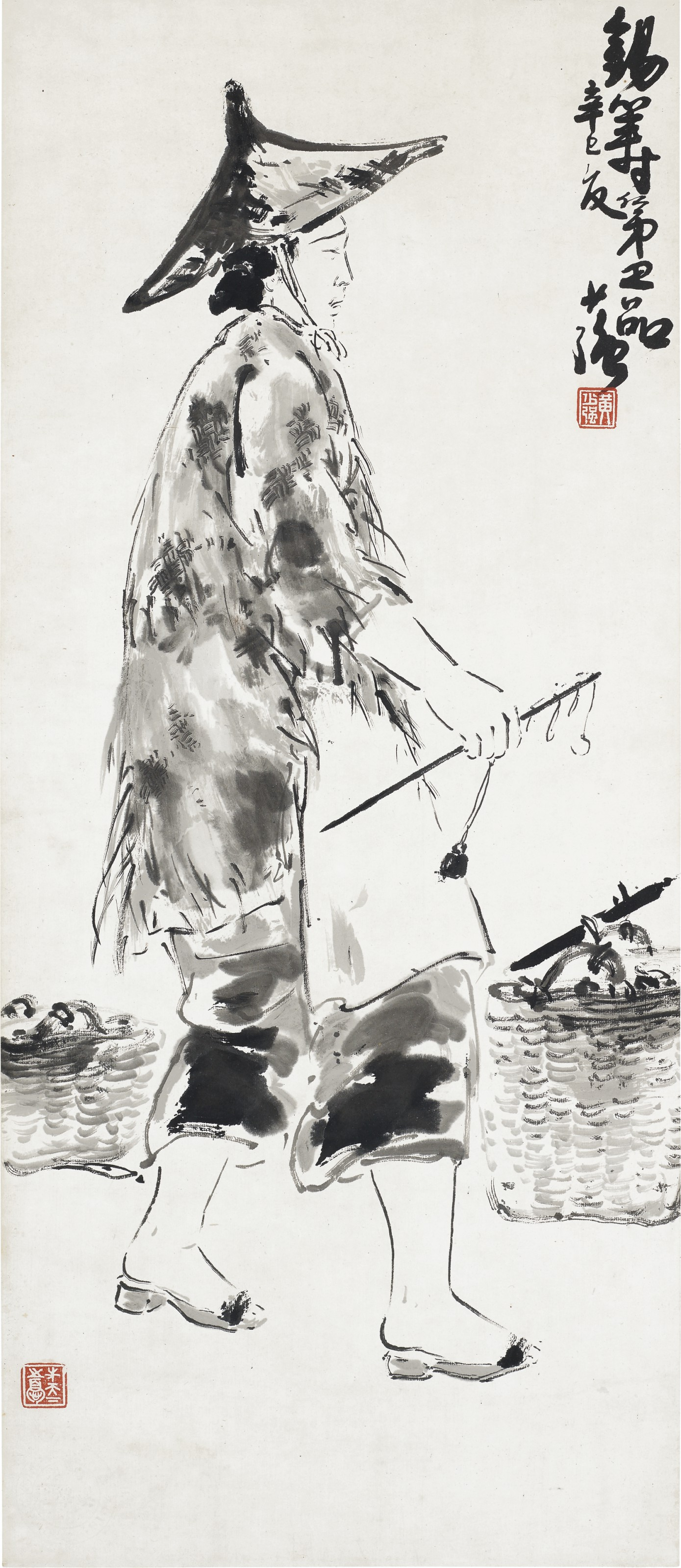
Peasant (1941)

== Works cited ==
- "黄少强(1901–1942) 谱家国哀愁 写民间疾苦" [Huang Shaoqiang (1901–1942) Wrote About the Sorrow of the Country and the Suffering of the People]. Southern Metropolis Daily (in Chinese). 23 March 2009. Archived from the original on 5 January 2024. (via Guangzhou Library)
- "黄少强·走向民间专题展" [Huang Shaoqiang: Towards the People Special Exhibition] (in Chinese). Guangdong Museum of Art. 6 March 2008. Archived from the original on 6 September 2024.
- "黄少强认为"有人格自然有风格" 对我的影响很大" [Huang Shaoqiang's Belief that "Personality Naturally Leads to Style" has Greatly Influenced Me] (in Chinese). Guangdong Museum of Art. 27 August 2017. Archived from the original on 6 September 2024.
- Jiang Xinchen (蒋欣陈) (26 November 2020). "潘鹤：渔女之父的珠海情缘" [Pan He: The Father of the Fisherwoman and His Love for Zhuhai]. Southcn.com (in Chinese). China South Publishing & MediaGroup. Archived from the original on 1 September 2024.
- Lam, Ka Ming Kevin (2018). Figural Modernism: Figure Painting of the Lingnan School and the Modernization of Chinese Art, 1911–1949 (Thesis). Northwestern University. doi:10.21985/n2-yvcg-4083.
- Li Xiaoqing (李小青) (n.d.). "另辟蹊径 独树一帜——记岭南派著名画家黄少强" [Taking a Different Path and Being Unique: Huang Shaoqiang, Famous Painter of the Lingnan School] (in Chinese). Foshan Museum. Archived from the original on 6 September 2024.
- "在线品鉴第四十二期—黄少强断塔秋零图" [Online Appreciation Issue 42 – Huang Shaoqiang's Broken Pagoda in Autumn] (in Chinese). Nanhai Museum. 26 November 2020. Archived from the original on 5 September 2024.
- Ye Shuming (叶曙明) (16 August 2021). "为平民而画的岭南画家黄少强" [Huang Shaoqiang: A Lingnan Painter for the Common People]. Yangcheng.com (in Chinese). Archived from the original on 20 May 2022.
- Zhong Lin (钟琳) (14 January 2015). "黄少强 一枝秃管衡身世描写人间疾苦声" [Huang Shaoqiang's Life: The Story of a Bald Pipe Describes the Suffering of the World]. Southcn.com (in Chinese). China South Publishing & MediaGroup. Archived from the original on 6 September 2024.
