= Tanaka Raishō =

Japanese painter (1868–1940)

- 田中頼璋
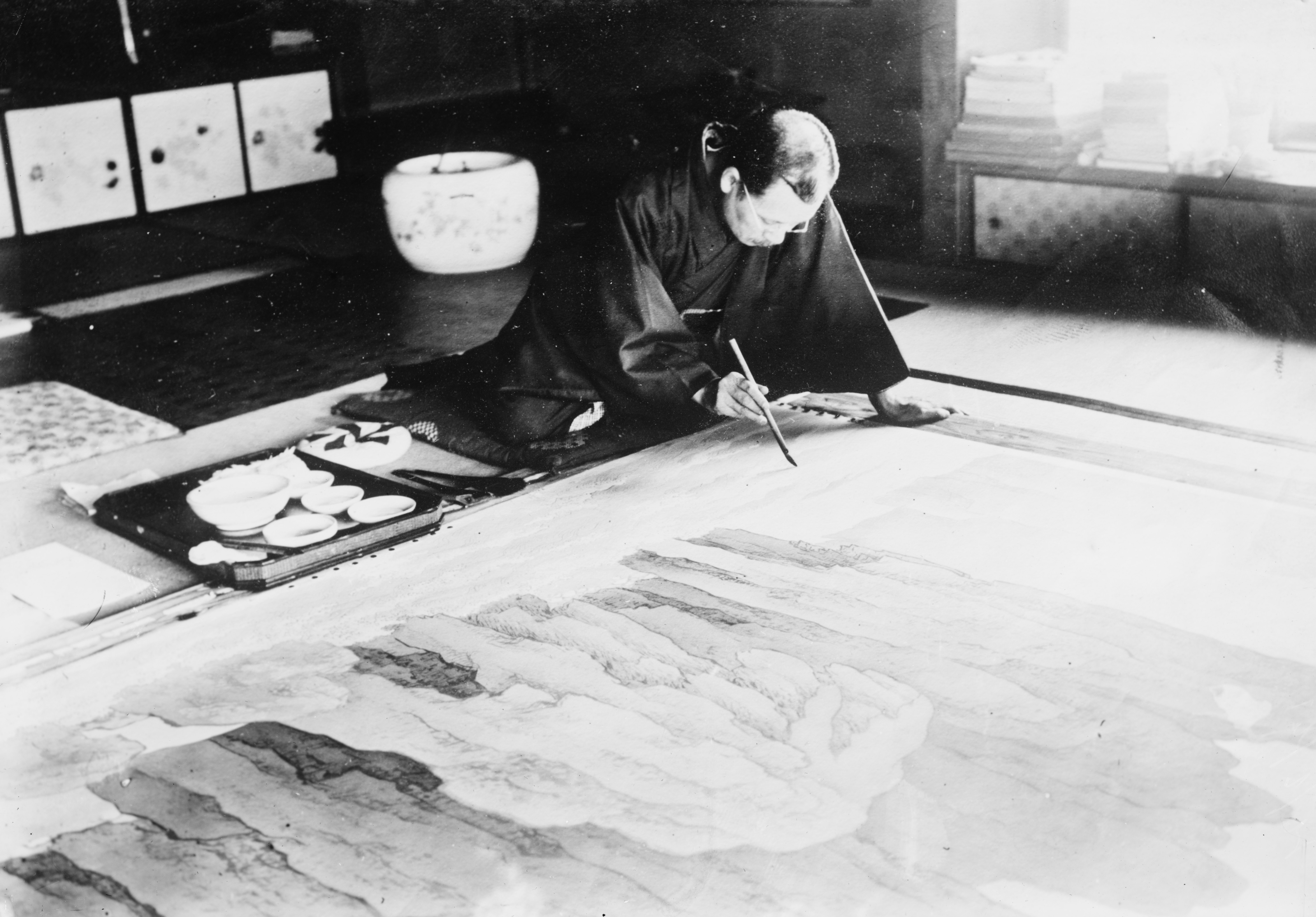
- Tanaka painting in his studio, 1900
- Born: Tanaka Daijiro (田中大治郎); 10 August 1868; Hamada, Shimane, Japan
- Died: 16 February 1940 (aged 71); Hiroshima, Japan

Tanaka Raishō (Japanese: 田中頼璋; 10 August 1868 – 16 February 1940) was a Japanese painter of the nihonga school. He participated in numerous exhibitions, winning first prize at the 1916 and 1917 Japan Fine Arts Exhibitions.

== Biography ==
Tanaka was born Tanaka Daijiro (田中大治郎) on 10 August 1868 in Hamada, Shimane. As a teenager, he travelled to the town of Hagi in Yamaguchi Prefecture, where he studied under Mori Kansai. In 1899 or 1902, Tanaka moved to Tokyo, where he learned from Kawabata Gyokushō. He signed most of his works Raishō, but also used the art names Toyofumi (豊文) and Yoriaki (頼章).

By the 1900s, Tanaka was presenting his works at exhibitions. He participated in several shows sponsored by the Japan Art Association. In 1907, he won third-place at the Tokyo Industrial Exhibition. Tanaka exhibited works at the Japan Fine Arts Exhibition beginning in 1908, winning several prizes – including third place in his inaugural show with Narutaki, as well as first place in 1916 and 1917. In 1910, Tanaka's Wintry Landscape was exhibited at the Japan–British Exhibition in London. When the Japan Fine Arts Exhibition was taken over by the Imperial Academy of Arts (now the Japan Art Academy), Tanaka was a nominated artist. He later became a judge with the exhibition, as well as a committee member.

In the 1900s, Tanaka took numerous students. One of these was Gao Qifeng, a Guangdong-born Chinese artist who had travelled to Japan with his brother Jianfu. Another Chinese student was He Xiangning, who studied under Tanaka from 1908. After the 1923 Great Kantō earthquake, Tanaka moved to Hiroshima. He died there on 16 February 1940, having suffered from nephritis. He was survived by his daughter, Michiko, who had travelled to Germany in 1930 to become an actress and musician.

One of Tanaka's grandchildren, Tanaka Kinnosuke, worked with the artist Okahara Taika to produce a book presenting Tanaka's oeuvre; it was published in 2009. Tanaka was recognized for his landscape paintings. Since his death, he has received little attention; Okahara attributes this to his failure to innovate. He worked primarily in the nihonga style, drawing on traditional Japanese painting while modernizing it with foreign elements.

== Gallery ==
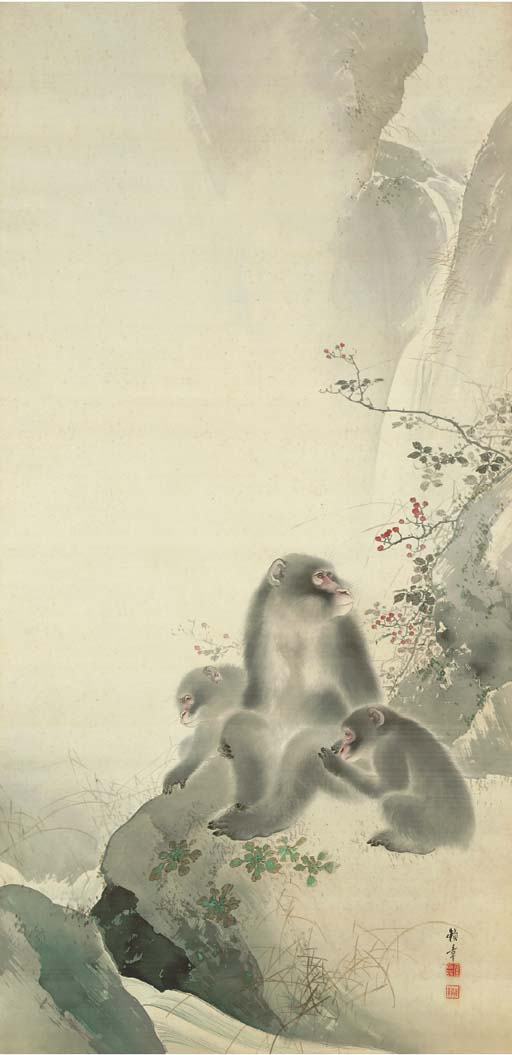
Three Monkeys on Bank Near Waterfall (1907)

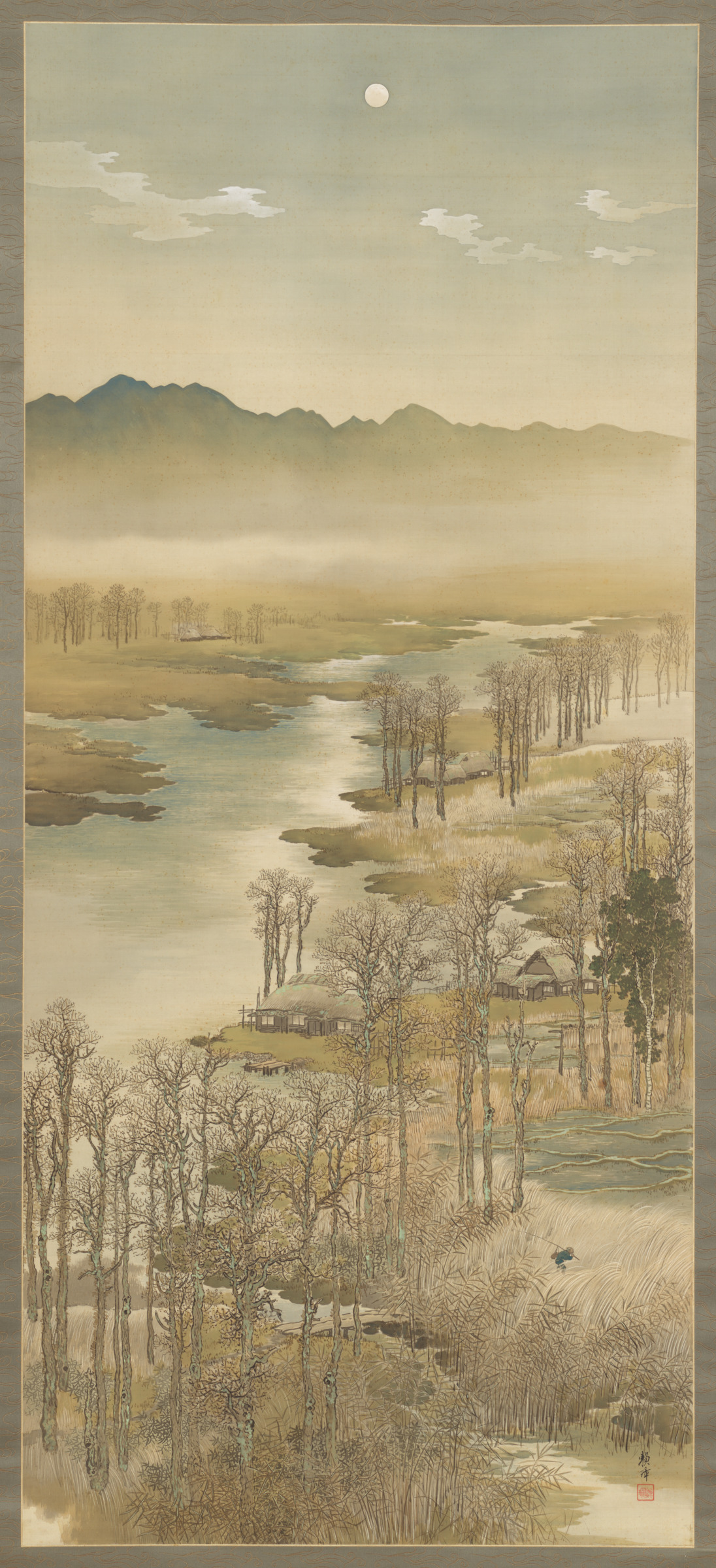
Mountain Moon in Four Seasons - Autumn (1916)

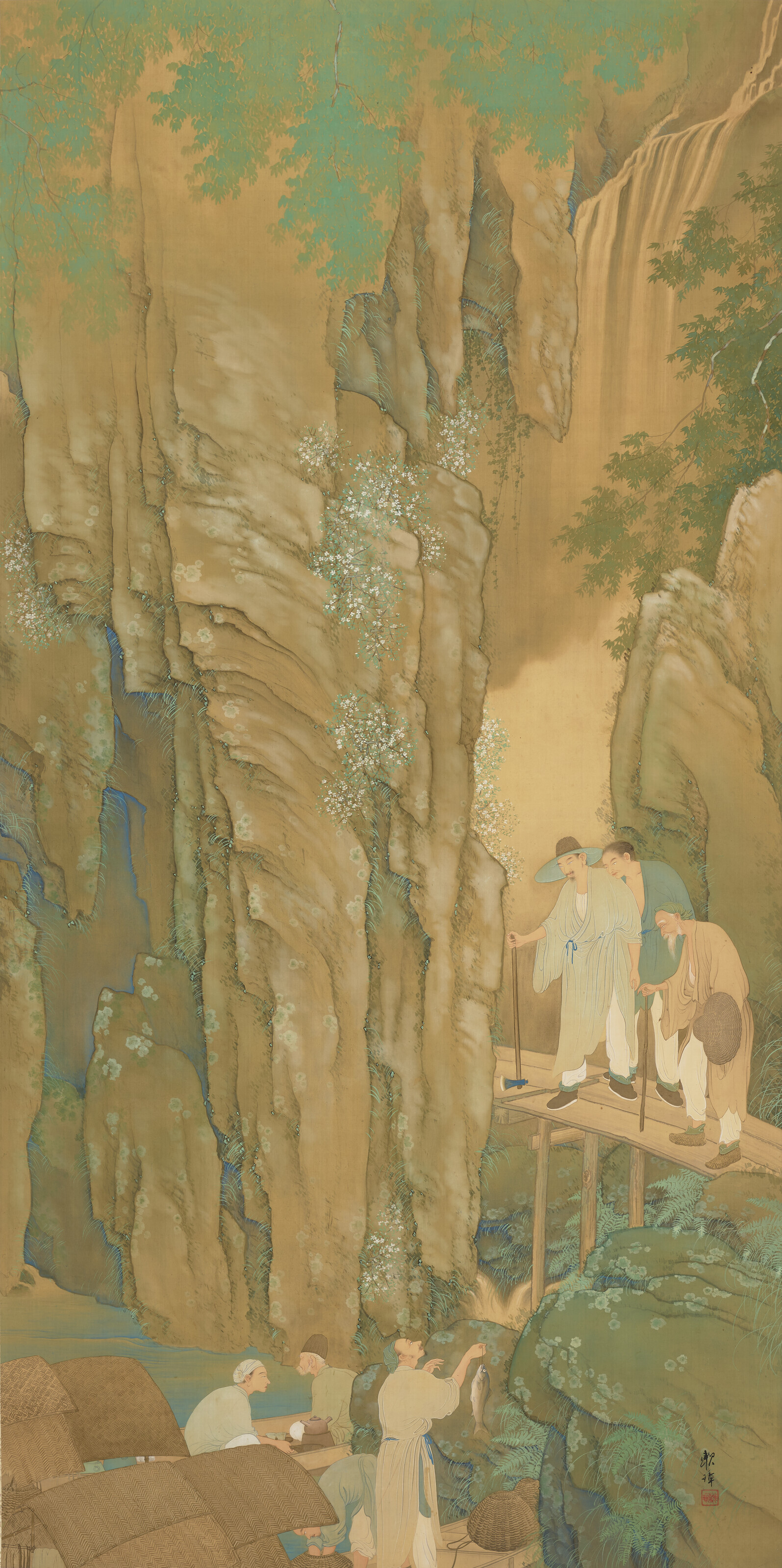
Deep Ravine Waterfall (undated)

== Works cited ==
- An Illustrated Catalogue of Japanese Modern Fine Arts Displayed at the Japan-British Exhibition, London 1910. Tokyo: Shimbi Shoin. 1910.
- Chu, Christina (1981). "The Art of Gao Qifeng: An Investigation of Historical Background and Stylistic Development". The Art of Gao Qifeng. Urban Council Hong Kong. pp. 6–12. ISBN 978-962-215-040-9.
- Eriko, Tomizawa-Kay (2017). "富泽爱理子, 何香凝对日本画的吸收与再发展，《借路扶桑：留日画家的中国画改良》（广州：岭南美术出版社，2017）". 何香凝对日本画的吸收与再发展 [Passing Through Japan: The Reform of Painting by Chinese Artists Studying in Japan, 1905-1937: He Xiangning's (1878–1972) Perception of Nihonga]. Lingnan Fine Arts Publishing House. pp. 83–112.
- Fujimura Junpei (藤村潤平) (23 June 2009). 原爆で散逸の画業一冊に 広島でも活動 田中頼璋 [One Volume of Artwork Lost to the Atomic Vomb: Yoriko Tanaka, Active in Hiroshima]. Chugoku Shimbun (in Japanese). Archived from the original on 7 October 2024.
- Japanese and Korean Art Including the Collection of David and Nayda Utterberg – Christie's 22 March 2022. New York: Christie's. 2022.
- Roberts, Laurence (1976). A Dictionary of Japanese Artists: Painting, Sculpture, Ceramics, Prints, Lacquer. Tokyo and New York: Weatherhill. ISBN 978-0-8348-0113-4.
- Sekikawa Fujiko (関川富士子) (n.d.). 田中路子――デコ伯母さんの思い出 [Michiko Tanaka – Memories of Aunt Deco] (in Japanese). Japanese–German Center Berlin. Archived from the original on 14 August 2024.
- Sullivan, Michael (1996). Art and Artists of Twentieth-Century China. Berkeley: University of California Press. ISBN 978-0-520-07556-6.
- 田中頼璋 [Tanaka Raishō] (in Japanese). National Institute for Cultural Heritage. Archived from the original on 6 May 2024.
- 田中頼璋 [Tanaka Raishō]. Kotobank (in Japanese). Archived from the original on 15 November 2017.
