= Zhang Kunyi =

Chinese painter

- 張坤儀

Personal details
- Born: 1895 Panyu, Guangdong, China
- Died: 1969 (aged 73–74) New York City, United States
- Cause of death: Cardiovascular disease

Zhang Kunyi
- Traditional Chinese: 張坤儀
- Simplified Chinese: 张坤仪
Transcriptions
Standard Mandarin
- Hanyu Pinyin: Zhāng Kūnyí
- Wade–Giles: Chang Kun-i

Zhang Kunyi (Chinese: 張坤儀; Wade–Giles: Chang Kun-i; 1895–1969) was a Chinese artist who specialized in traditional Chinese Painting and Chinese calligraphy. She was a feminist and a pioneer towards the development of female artists in China.

== Early life ==
Zhang was the only female artist belonging to the group Tian Feng Qi Zi (天风七子), she became a student of Gao Qifeng at the age of 13 upon meeting him in Shanghai. Little of her life as a child is known; her parents died while she was still very young. Zhang received an excellent education as a child and later as a teenager was given an education that concerned literature from various countries in Europe.

== Education ==
Zhang's art career can be divided into the studying of calligraphy as well as painting. She studied under two separate teachers, both masters, and well-celebrated artists in China. Ye Gongchuo and Gao Qifeng influenced Zhang greatly and shaped the way she portrayed and created her artwork.

== Art career ==
KunYi Zhang developed a unique style of painting with the help of her teachers. Her art has been praised throughout the past decades, and she is now considered to be one of China's most notable women contemporary artists who worked in the field of traditional Chinese art and Chinese calligraphy. Her works have always been of great value to the art world in both China and globally, and her contributions even influenced the revolution within China that she experienced. Under her influence, art became a form of expressing opinions towards the war and a reflection of society in general. KunYi Zhang painted in a different style after the death of teacher QiFeng Gao, and focused more on promoting art spreading it throughout the world.

== Artistic style ==
Zhang Kunyi was especially proficient at painting traditional landscape scenery, and bird and flower painting. Her work falls within the category of the so-called Lingnan school of painting. Her career in this particular field began in 1919. Meanwhile, the great painter, Gao Qifeng, became her teacher. Zhang devoted immense effort to enhancing her skill as a painter. In her later artworks, the "masculine" and "feminine" spirits live in harmony and evince a beauty of both grandeur and urbanity. Most Chinese calligraphic painting was elegant, but in Zhang's work, there are many "gentle" elements and a romanticism that could only be created by a female artist. Her painting style was deeply influenced by Gao Qifeng. Moreover, Zhang was passionate about painting birds and flowers. In 1930, The Lotus with Quail received the gold medal at the International Exhibition in Belgium.

=== Traditional landscape scenery ===
The first decades of the twentieth century marked the end of the insular, tradition-bound Qing dynasty (1644–1911) and the forceful entry of China into the modern age. Most traditional landscape painting was elegant, but in Zhang's traditional landscape work, there are many "gentle" elements and a romanticism that could only be created by a female artist. Zhang's paintings focus heavily on traditional landscape scenery, which focuses on Shan shui, where the mountains, water and other shapes created on the canvas heavily relies on brushwork and the contrast between light and dark in addition to finer and thinker lines create an imagery that suggest to people certain objects within the painting. Her paintings also often show "masculine features", as the brushstrokes show no hesitation, and are bold and strong.

=== Landscape scenery ===
Zhang is known for using darker, thinner lines when depicting mountains. Her brushwork allows her to carefully show details such as the edges of the mountains, enhancing the idea of dimension. Her trees are most often depicted with softer, shorter strokes, as if they have been caught in a gust of wind.

=== Birds and flowers ===
Birds and flowers are a speciality of Zhang's. Her branches are often portrayed with thicker lines, with great contrast of light and dark to give the branch dimension. Her flowers are mostly painted in bright colors such as pink and red. Her lotuses are painted nearly always with fine and simple strokes to emphasize the Chinese belief that lotus flowers are a symbolization of purity, one of the most important virtues. The bird and flower genre have been a time-honored, deeply-seated tradition in the history of Chinese art. However, it has encountered a crisis of existence since the 20th century when many artists turned to Western painting style, which including Zhang.

== Calligraphy ==
Zhang was also proficient at painting Chinese calligraphy. She was one of the female artists that were most accomplished at Chinese calligraphy, and most of her works depicted calligraphic images. The style of her calligraphy was unique. Allegedly, because she was a female artist, her work was mostly "gentle" and romantic. However, her teacher was the originator of the Lingnan school, hence she was deeply influenced by him, and there are both "hard" (刚) and "soft" (柔) styles in her calligraphic works. In 1938, Gao Qifeng died in Hong Kong. Zhang wrote many poems to commemorate him, and those works became a famous part of her oeuvre. The most famous was The Picture of Resentment Filling the Universe. This work reflected her longing for him.

== Exhibitions ==
Zhang became a resident in the United States and helped Chinese overseas citizens during the Second Sino-Japanese War. On January 28, 1939, she took 90 paintings by Gao Qifeng to San Francisco. She attended the San Francisco Exposition, and many overseas Chinese were evidently proud of her work. After 1940, Kunyi chose to settle permanently in the United States. She had an exhibition at the Metropolitan Museum of Art in New York, entitled The Art Exhibition of Qifeng Gao and Kunyi Zhang. For the rest of her life, she continued working to popularize both Chinese calligraphy and Chinese landscape painting, especially in her adopted country. In 1969, Zhang died from heart disease in her apartment in New York.

=== List of exhibitions in China ===
- China Women's Art Exhibition, Ningbo, 1934
- ShaoAng Zhao Art Gallery, 2012-2013
- QiFeng Gao and Tian Feng Qi Zi Exhibition, Hong Kong University, 2013
- JianFu Gao and Students Exhibition, Taiwan, 2017
- Tian Feng Exhibition, ZhuangZhou, 2017
- LingNan School art exhibition, Jilin Provincial Museum, 2018

== Auctions ==
Zhang's art is till this day one of the most expensive within the art market of China. In 2005, FuBi Su bought KunYi Zhang's Fallen Flower and Bird in an auction in Hong Kong for 53424RMB. In the same year, another of her paintings Flower and Bird sold for 55000RMB in GuangZhou, with the rest of the smaller paintings being sold for around 3000-5000 RMB. As of 2008, her paintings vary from 4,300 RMB to 10,000RMB per flat inch, her artwork has sold up to 1,574,093 RMB in total, with many paintings still being auctioned. Apart from her teacher QiFeng Gao, she remains the second painter with the highest value for her artwork. KunYi Zhang's art can be sold for a larger value in Hong Kong compared to mainland China, as she is more well known there as an extremely famous and successful woman artist. One of the most recent auctions that took place in Hong Kong in the spring of 2018 lists her artwork XiangBi Mountain for approximately 150,000 HKD. Other paintings such as Wild Geese In The Moonlight has been sold for 125,000 HKD, and Roaring Tiger for 75,000 HKD.
