= Qixia Mountain =

Mountain in Nanjing, China

Coordinates: 32°09′37″N 118°57′53″E

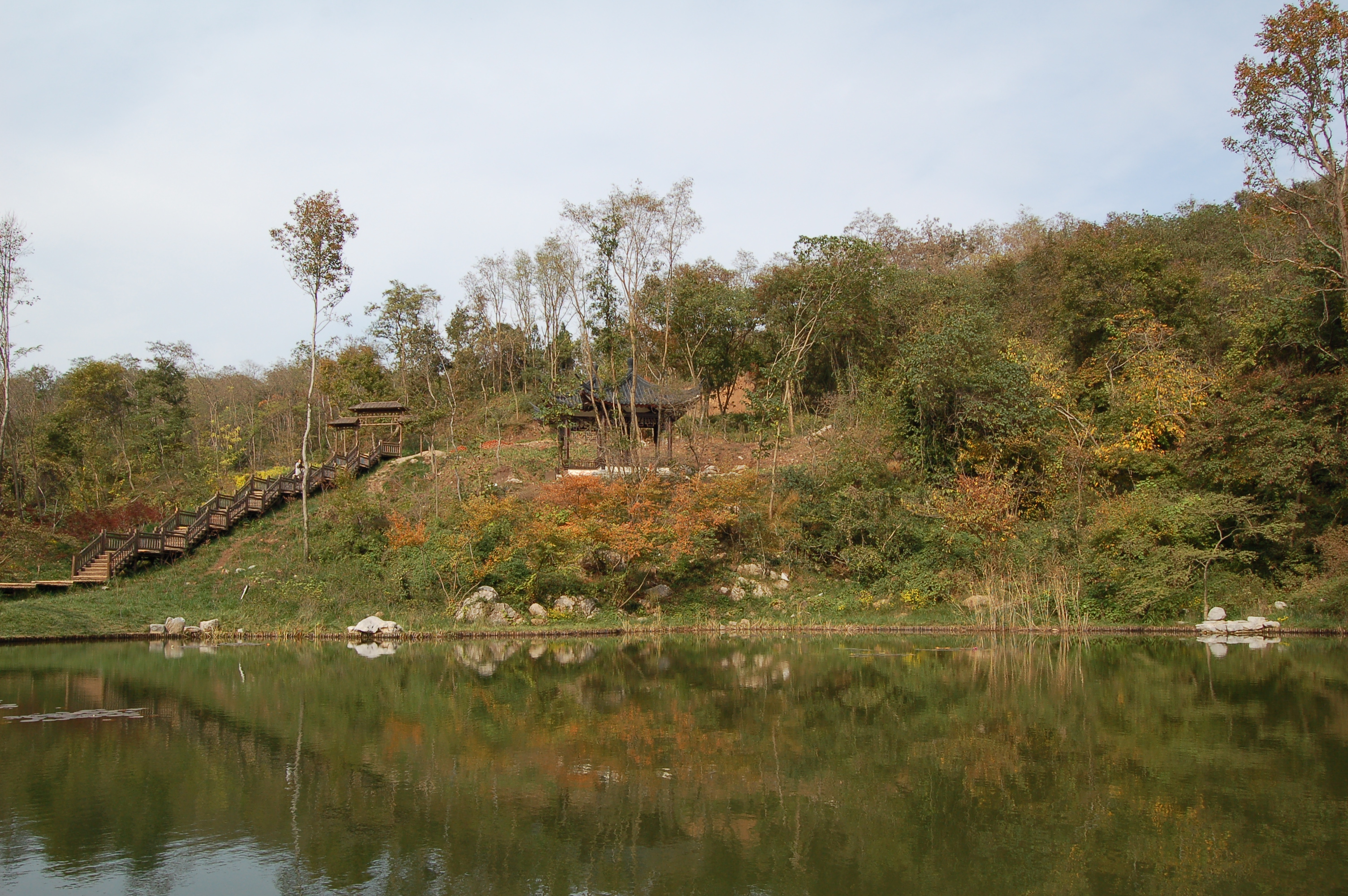
Maple Hill Lake, located within the area

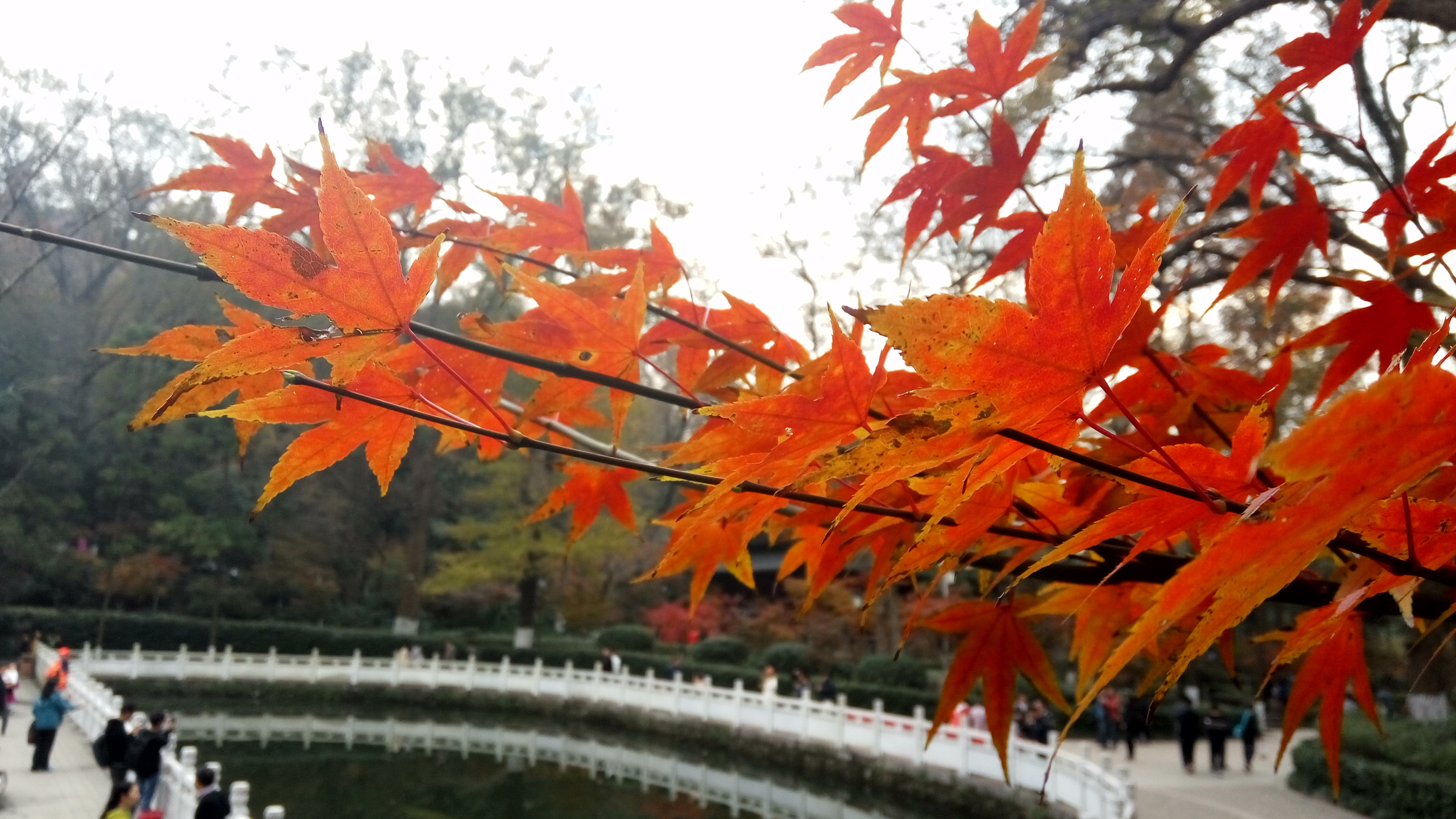
Qixia Mountain is known for its autumn scenery.

Qixia Mountain (simplified Chinese: 栖霞山; traditional Chinese: 棲霞山; pinyin: Qīxiá shān) is a mountain in the northeast part of Nanjing, Jiangsu Province, China.

In the Southern Dynasties (420–589), there was a Qixia cottage (栖霞精舍) in the mountain, so the mountain's name Qixia derived from it. Qixia Mountain includes three mountain peaks: the main peak, Sanmao Peak, with an elevation of 286 m (938 ft), Dragon Mountain, like a lying dragon, located in the northeast, and Tiger Mountain, like a fallen tiger, located in the northwest. Qixia Mountain has many scenic spots and historical sites. Its red autumnal leaves and especially its Dongfeitian grottos which were founded in 2000, make it a famous tourist attraction both at home and to abroad.
