= Eight Sights of Guangzhou =

Tourist attractions in Guangzhou, China

- Chinese: 羊城八景
- Literal meaning: Ram City's Eight Views
Transcriptions
Standard Mandarin
- Hanyu Pinyin: Yangcheng Bajing
Yue: Cantonese
- Jyutping: joeng4 sing4 baat3 ging2

The Eight Views of Ram City, also known as the Eight Sights of Guangzhou is the collective name for various collections of the eight most famous tourist attractions in Guangzhou, China, during different periods of its history. Collections of "Eight Views" is a common trope in Chinese travel literature.

== Song dynasty ==
The Eight Sights of Guangzhou in the Song dynasty were recorded in the Annals of Nanhai County (南海县志) of the Kangxi Era and the Annals of Guangzhou Prefecture (广州府志) of the Qianlong Era. Most of the sights were closely related to water bodies in the city, reflecting its tight cultural connection to water.

- Fuxu Yuri (Chinese: 扶胥浴日) referred to Yuri Pavilion in Fuxu Town, located in present-day Miaotou Village, Nangang Town to the east of Nanhai Temple. Yuri Pavilion used to overlook the Pearl River. At dawn, the sun could be seen rising amidst the waves of the river. The pavilion has survived till the modern days, but the riverside has retreated by hundreds of metres. Trees and buildings standing on the alluvial land now completely blocks the view of the river from the pavilion.
- Shimen Fanzhao (Chinese: 石门返照; lit. 'reflections of Shimen') was located at the intersection of a tributary of the Bei River with Liuxi River in present-day Shimen Village, Jianggao Town in Baiyun District. The surrounding mountains were reflected upon the river. The sun at dawn and dusk would add to the splendor of the sight. Occasionally, mirages could be seen above the water. Legend had it that the view of Shaozhou of hundreds of li away had been seen in a mirage.
- Haishan Xiaoji (Chinese: 海山晓霁; lit. 'Haishan Building after dawn shower') referred to Haishan Building. Located in present-day Beijing Lu, Haishan Building had an immediate view of the Pearl River thanks to the width of the river at its time. The sight disappeared in the Yuan dynasty as the building caught fire and collapsed.
- Zhujiang Qiuse (Chinese: 珠江秋色; lit. 'autumn scenery of Pearl River') was found near the intersection of present-day Yanjiang Xilu and Xindi 1 Henglu. In the Song dynasty, this segment of the Pearl River running through Guangzhou was still as wide as one kilometre. A round reef, Haizhu Reef, lay in the middle of the river. Tides would submerge and expose the reef every day. The river has since narrowed over the course of time. Haizhu Reef became buried underground inland in the 1930s.
- Juhu Yunying (Chinese: 菊湖云影; lit. 'reflections of clouds on Juhu Lake') referred to Juhu Lake, a reservoir constructed by Lu Gou, Prefectural Governor of Guangzhou and Military Commissioner of Lingnan in 836 CE. The reservoir was decorated with pavilions and pagodas; cotton trees and erythrinas were planted along the blanks. It became a popular scenic spot for spring-time excursions of local residents. During the Five Dynasties and Ten Kingdoms period, the Southern Han dynasty established an imperial palace at the reservoir. The reservoir silted and dried up in the Yuan dynasty. Present-day Xiaobei Lu runs by the southeast of Yuexiu Mountain through the place where the reservoir was located.
- Pujian Lianquan (Chinese: 蒲涧濂泉) was a creek on Baiyun Mountain. The name "Pujian" came from the calami growing in the creek. Creek water fell off a tall cliff and was blown into countless droplets by the mountain breeze. When it rained, the falling droplets became a waterfall, then a spring emerged and was called Lianquan Spring. The present-day Pujian Creek has changed its course, and calami are no longer found in it. The remains of the waterfall of Lianquan Spring can be found at the north end of Lianquan Lu.
- Guangxiao Puti (Chinese: 光孝菩提; lit. 'pipal in Guangxiao Temple') referred to Guangxiao Temple. In 676, a revered monk named Zhiyao planted a pipal in the temple. The tree lived for more than 1100 years until it was brought down by a typhoon in 1800. In 1802, a new tree was planted and was a descendant of the older tree, which can be found in the temple today.
- Datong Yanyu (Chinese: 大通烟雨) referred to Datong Temple and Yanyu Well in the temple. Yanyu Well was said to be capable of forecasting weather. When rain was about to fall, fog would rise from the well. The temple was reduced to debris during the occupation of Guangzhou by Japanese forces in the Second Sino-Japanese War. Located in Fangcun by the mouth of Huadi River, only several street names were left of the temple, and only one of those streets is still found today.

== Yuan dynasty ==
The Eight Sights of Guangzhou in the Yuan dynasty retained four sights of those in the Song dynasty while adding four new ones. The four sights from the Song dynasty were all water-related; meanwhile, the four new ones were all mountain sights. All eight sights were found outside the city walls.

- Fuxu Yuri
- Shimen Fanzhao
- Datong Yanyu
- Pujian Lianquan
- Baiyun Wanwang (Chinese: 白云晚望) referred to the view of the city of Guangzhou at dusk from Baiyun Temple on Baiyun Mountain. Baiyun Temple was located on the south side of Baiyun Mountain. In the Yuan dynasty, the city boundaries were still quite far away from Baiyun Mountain. Therefore, at Baiyun Temple, the view of the entire city could be seen and was particularly splendid at dusk. The location of the sight has now become a popular spot for moon sighting on the night of the Mid-Autumn Festival.
- Jingtai Senggui (Chinese: 景泰僧归; lit. 'monks returning to Jingtai Temple') referred to Jingtai Temple on the north side of Baiyun Mountain. It was established by a famous monk named Jingtai in the Datong era of the reign of Emperor Wu of the Liang dynasty. The temple had since gradually become a popular tourist attraction. The sight was destroyed in the early Qing dynasty when the rebel armies of Shang Kexi and Geng Zhongming logged trees in the area for building cannons during their invasion of Guangzhou.
- Yuetai Qiuse (Chinese: 粤台秋色; lit. 'autumn sights at Yuewang Platform') referred to Yuexiu Mountain. Yuewang Platform was the earliest recreational spot in Guangzhou. Built during the Western Han dynasty, only the pedestal was left to be found in the Tang dynasty. The sight was then known for its natural landscape.
- Lingzhou Aofu (Chinese: 灵洲鳌负; lit. 'Mount Lingzhou carried by a godly turtle') referred to Mount Lingzhou located in present-day Guanyao Town, Nanhai District, Foshan to the northwest of Guangzhou. In the Yuan dynasty, the nearby Xinan and Lubao Streams had not silted. The mount was surrounded by vast water in all directions. Passengers travelling by the mount would climb it for a sightseeing trip of the mount itself as well as the Xi and Bei Rivers. The sight declined over the last 300 years as the surrounding water narrowed and transportation became inconvenient.

== Ming dynasty ==
The Eight Sights of Guangzhou of the Ming dynasty were recorded in Transcripts of Ancient Manuscripts on Yangcheng (Chinese: 《羊城古钞》), which quoted Annals of Ming (Chinese: 《明志》) as well as Continued Annals of Nanhai County (Chinese: 《南海县续志》), compiled in 1910. The list of this era saw a radical departure from that of the Song dynasty. As the city boundaries expanded, only sights located in the urban areas were selected.

- Yuexiu Songtao (Chinese: 粤秀松涛; lit. 'pines of Yuexiu Mountain') referred to Yuexiu Mountain.
- Suishi Dongtian (Chinese: 穗石洞天; lit. 'scenes of Sui Rock') was a red sandstone hillock. It had been an islet located in shallow seawater and developed numerous potholes due to corrosion. Two such potholes found on a big rock resembled the shape of a footprint and were believed to be trace left by an immortal, earning the rock a name "Xianren Muji" (Chinese: 仙人拇迹; lit. 'immortal's footprint'). The scene is now part of Wuxian Temple. What used to be by the seaside during the Jin dynasty is now a few kilometres inland from the north shore of the Pearl River.
- Panshan Yunqi (Chinese: 番山云气; lit. 'mist on Mount Pan') is now just an inconspicuous mound inside Sun Yat-sen Literature Library on Wende Lu. During its glorious days, the ancient Wen Creek flowed to its east. In the wet days, evaporated creek water would create a mist in the shade of pines and cotton trees. However, Wen Creek was rerouted away in 1467 to connect with Donghao Stream. With the loss of its water source, the scene gradually disappeared in the mid-late Ming dynasty.
- Yaozhou Chunxiao (Chinese: 药洲春晓; lit. 'spring dawn on Yaozhou Islet') was an artificial islet in Xi Lake, a lake built from excavating a natural pool during the Southern Han dynasty. "Yaozhou" literally means "medicine islet". It was the place where Southern Han emperor Liu Yan gathered alchemists to produce medicine. Medicine was dumped into the water, dying the water into a unique scenery. Xi Lake was filled with earth after the Chenghua era in the Ming dynasty. Today, a garden on Jiaoyu Lu named Site of Yaozhou (Chinese: 药洲遗址) encloses the remains of the sight.
- Qilin Sujing (Chinese: 琪林苏井; lit. 'jade woods and Su Shi's well') referred to Xuanmiao Temple, which was known for its gardening in the Ming dynasty. In local legends, trees inside were planted by immortals. There was also a well which was said to be drilled by Su Shi. Thus the sight was named. The site of Xuanmiao Temple has since become a densely populated urban area. No trace of the sight can be found today.
- Zhujiang Qinglan (Chinese: 珠江晴澜; lit. 'waves of the Pearl River in a clear day') was the same sight as Zhujiang Qiuse of the Song dynasty.
- Xiangshan Qiaoge (Chinese: 象山樵歌; lit. 'Mount Xianggang wood cutters' songs')
- Liwan Yuchang (Chinese: 荔湾渔唱; lit. 'Lychee Bay fishermen's songs')

== Qing dynasty ==
Eight Views of the Ram City were chosen through public appraisal twice in the Qing dynasty. The first election was in the Qianlong era and the second was from the Tongzhi era to the Guangxu era.

=== Qianlong era ===
Quoted from Yangcheng Guchao (Chinese: 《羊城古鈔》; pinyin: yángchéng gǔchāo; lit. 'Ram City Ancient Manuscripts').

- Wuxian Xiadong (Chinese: 五仙霞洞; pinyin: wǔxiān xiádòng; lit. 'Five Immortals Grotto'): Temple of the Five Immortals
- Pazhou Dizhu (Chinese: 琶洲砥柱; pinyin: pázhōu dǐzhù; lit. 'Pazhou Pagoda As An Axial Column'): Pazhou Pagoda
- Guwu Yushan (Chinese: 孤兀禺山; pinyin: gūwù yúshān; lit. 'Lone Towering Yushan Mountain'): Academy on Yushan Mountain
- Zhenhai Cenglou (Chinese: 镇海层楼; pinyin: zhènhǎi cénglóu; lit. 'Zhenhai Tower (Five Storeyed Pagoda)'): Zhenhai Tower
- Fuqiu Danjing (Chinese: 浮丘丹井; pinyin: fúqiū dānjǐng; lit. 'Fuqiu Reef And Alchemy Well'): Fuqiu Reef
- Xiqiao Yunfu (Chinese: 西樵云瀑; pinyin: xīqiáo yúnpù; lit. 'Waterfall From Clouds On Xiqiao Mountain'): Xiqiao Mountain
- Donghai Yuzhu (Chinese: 东海鱼珠; pinyin: dōnghǎi yúzhū; lit. 'Yuzhu Reef At East Sea'): Yuzhu Reef
- Yuexiu Lianfeng (Chinese: 粤秀连峰; pinyin: yuèxiǔ liánfēng; lit. 'The Long Sweep Of Hills Of Yuexiu Mountain'): Yuexiu Mountain

=== Tongzhi and Guangxu eras ===
Quoted from Yuedong Biji (Chinese: 《粤东笔记》; pinyin: yuèdōng bǐjì; lit. 'Miscellanea of East Guangdong').

- Shimen Fanzhao (Chinese: 石门返照; pinyin: shímén fǎnzhào; lit. 'Shimen Reflection'): Shimen and Small Beijiang River
- Boluo Yuri (Chinese: 菠萝浴日; pinyin: bōluó yùrì; lit. 'Pineapple Temple Bathed In Sunlight') or Fuxu Yuri (Chinese: 扶胥浴日; pinyin: fúxū yùrì; lit. 'Fuxu Bathed In Sunlight'): Temple of Nanhai God, alternatively called Pineapple Temple.
- Zhujiang Yeyue (Chinese: 珠江夜月; pinyin: zhūjiāng yèyuè; lit. 'Moonlight On Pearl River') or Haizhu Yeyue (Chinese: 海珠夜月; pinyin: hǎizhū yèyuè; lit. 'Moonlight On Haizhu Reef'): Pearl River
- Jinshan Gusi (Chinese: 金山古寺; pinyin: jīnshān gǔsì; lit. 'Jinshan Mountain Ancient Temple'): Lingzhou and Small Jinshan Mountain Temple
- Datong Yanyu (Chinese: 大通烟雨; pinyin: dàtōng yānyǔ; lit. 'Datong Temple and Yanyu Well'): Datong Temple and Yanyu Well
- Baiyun Wanwang (Chinese: 白云晚望; pinyin: báiyún wǎnwàng; lit. 'Night View Of Baiyun Temple'): Baiyun Temple
- Pujian Lianquan (Chinese: 蒲涧濂泉; pinyin: pújiàn liánquán; lit. 'Changpu Creek and Lianquan Spring'): Changpu Creek
- Jingtai Senggui (Chinese: 景泰僧归; pinyin: jǐngtài sēngguī; lit. 'Monks Returning to Jingtai Temple'): Jingtai Temple

== 1963 ==
- Baiyun Songtao (Chinese: 白云松涛; pinyin: báiyún sōngtāo; lit. 'Soughing Of The Wind In The Pines On Baiyun Mountain'): Baiyun Mountain, Moxing Peak and Mingzhu Pagoda
- Luogang Xiangxue (Chinese: 萝岗香雪; pinyin: luógǎng xiāngxuě; lit. 'Luogang Xiangxue (Placename)'): Luogang Xiangxue Park, Luofeng Temple
- Yuexiu Yuantiao (Chinese: 越秀远眺; pinyin: yuèxiù yuǎntiào; lit. 'Bird's-eye View of Yuexiu Mountain'): Yuexiu Mountain, Zhenhai Tower, Sun Yat-sen Memorial Monument
- Zhuhai Danxin (Chinese: 珠海丹心; pinyin: zhūhǎi dānxīn; lit. 'Loyalty Of Pearl River'): Haizhu Square and its nearby scenic spots centering about Guangzhou Liberation Monument
- Hongling Xuri (Chinese: 红陵旭日; pinyin: hónglíng xùrì; lit. 'The Rising Sun Above The Red (representing Communist) Mausoleum'): Memorial Mausoleum to the Martyrs in Guangzhou Uprising, or Martyrs' Park as more commonly known
- Shuangqiao Yanyu (Chinese: 双桥烟雨; pinyin: shuāngqiáo yānyǔ; lit. 'Misty Rain On Twin Bridges'): Zhujiang Bridge
- E'tan Yeyue (Chinese: 鹅潭夜月; pinyin: é'tán yèyuè; lit. 'Moonlight on Bai'etan'): Bai'etan and Shamian Island
- Donghu Chunxiao (Chinese: 东湖春晓; pinyin: dōnghú chūnxiǎo; lit. 'A Spring Sunrise Above Dongshan Lake'): Dongshan Lake Park

== 1986 ==
- Hongling Xuri (Chinese: 红陵旭日; pinyin: hónglíng xùrì; lit. 'The Rising Sun Above The Red (representing Communist) Mausoleum'): Memorial Mausoleum to the Martyrs in Guangzhou Uprising, or Martyrs' Park as more commonly known
- Huangpu Yunqiang (Chinese: 黄埔云樯; pinyin: huángpǔ yúnqiáng; lit. 'Masts In The Clouds At Huangpu Port'): Huangpu Port and Xinsha Port
- Yunshan Jinxiu (Chinese: 云山锦绣; pinyin: yúnshān jǐnxiù; lit. 'Baiyun Mountain as Splendid as Brocade'): Baiyun Mountain
- Zhuhai Qingbo (Chinese: 珠海晴波; pinyin: zhūhǎi qíngbō; lit. 'Clear Waves On Pearl River'): Haizhu Square
- Huanghua Haoqi (Chinese: 黄花浩气; pinyin: huánghuā hàoqì; lit. 'Noble Spirit of Huanghuagang'): Mausoleum of 72 Martyrs at Huanghuagang, or Huanghuagang Park as more commonly known
- Yuexiu Cenglou (Chinese: 越秀层楼; pinyin: yuèxiù cénglóu; lit. 'Zhenhai Tower (Five Storeyed Pagoda) On Yuexiu Mountain'): Zhenhai Tower
- Liuhua Yuyu (Chinese: 流花玉宇; pinyin: liúhuā yùyǔ; lit. 'Residence of Immortals In Liuhua'): Buildings surrounding China Import And Export Fair (Canton Fair) Building (Liuhua Pavilion) and Guangzhou railway station
- Longdong Qilin (Chinese: 龙洞琪林; pinyin: lóngdòng qílín; lit. 'Beautiful Scene Of Forests In Longdong'): South China Botanical Garden

== 2002 ==
The following are those chosen through public appraisal in 2001 and brought out in 2002.

- Yunshan Diecui (Note: Yunshan Diecui: Chinese: 雲山曡翠; pinyin: yúnshān diécuì; Jyutping: wan4 saan1 daap/dip?? ceoi3; lit. 'Baiyun Mountain Green and In Arranged Well'): Baiyun Mountain
- Zhushui Yeyun (Chinese: 珠水夜韵; pinyin: zhūshuǐ yèyùn; lit. 'Lingering Charm of Pearl River At Night'): Pearl River
- Yuexiu Xinhui (Chinese: 越秀新晖; pinyin: yuèxiù xīnhuī; lit. 'Sunshine On Yuexiu Mountain'): Yuexiu Mountain
- Tianhe Piaojuan (Chinese: 天河飘绢; pinyin: tiānhé piāojuàn; lit. 'Floating Silk In Tianhe'): CITIC Plaza and the artificial waterfall at Guangzhou East railway station square
- Guci Liufang (Chinese: 古祠流芳; pinyin: gǔcí liúfāng; lit. 'Ancient Academy Leaving A Good Name'): Chen Clan Academy and Guangdong Folk Craftwork Museum
- Huanghua Haoyue (Chinese: 黄花皓月; pinyin: huánghuāhào yuè; lit. 'Noble Moon Above Huanghuagang'): Mausoleum of 72 Martyrs at Huanghuagang, or Huanghuagang Park as more commonly known
- Wuhuan Chenxi (Chinese: 五环晨曦; pinyin: wǔhuán chénxī; lit. 'First Sun Rays In The Morning On The Five Rings'): Guangdong Olympic Stadium, or known as Aoti Main Stadium
- Lianfeng Guanhai (Chinese: 莲峰观海; pinyin: liánfēng guānhǎi; lit. 'View Of The Sea From Lianhua Mountain'): Panyu Lianhua Mountain

== 2011 ==
The following are those chosen through public appraisal and brought out in 2011.

- Tayao Xincheng (Chinese: 塔耀新城; pinyin: tǎyào xīnchéng; lit. 'Tower Shining Through The New Town'): Canton Tower, Chigang Pagoda, Haixinsha, Flower City Square, Guangzhou Twin Towers, CITIC Plaza, etc.
- Zhushui Liuguang (Chinese: 珠水流光; pinyin: zhūshuǐ liúguāng; lit. 'Pearl River Flowing and Shining'): Pearl River (segment from Bai'etan to Pazhou), Wharves, Bai'etan, Shamian Island, Yanjiang Lu, Ersha Island, Haixinsha, Guangzhou Convention and Exhibition Center, etc.
- Yunshan Diecui (Chinese: 云山叠翠; pinyin: yúnshān diécuì; lit. 'Baiyun Mountain Green and In Arranged Well'): Baiyun Mountain, Yuntai Garden, etc.
- Yuexiu Fenghua (Chinese: 越秀风华; pinyin: yuèxiù fēnghuá; lit. 'Elegance and Talent of Yuexiu Mountain'): Yuexiu Mountain, Zhenhai Tower, Five Rams Statue, Sun Yat-sen Memorial Monument, etc.
- Guxi Liufang (Chinese: 古祠流芳; pinyin: gǔcí liúfāng; lit. 'Ancient Academy Leaving A Good Name'): Chen Clan Academy and Guangdong Folk Craftwork Museum
- Liwan Shengjing (Chinese: 荔湾胜景; pinyin: lìwān shèngjǐng; lit. 'Wonderful Scenery of Liwan'): Litchi Bay, Liwan Lake, Arcades on Enning Lu, Xiguan Residences, etc.
- Kecheng Jinxiu (Chinese: 科城锦绣; pinyin: kēchéng jǐnxiù; lit. 'Science City as Splendid as Brocade'): Guangzhou Science City
- Shidi Changwan (Chinese: 湿地唱晚; pinyin: shīdì chàngwǎn; lit. 'Wetland Singing at Night'): Nansha Wetland Park

== 2025 ==
This round of selection was organized by the Yangcheng Evening News Group and the Guangzhou Daily Newspaper Group. Initially, it accepted recommended nominations from all districts across the city and self-recommendations from scenic areas. On June 25, 66 scenic spots were shortlisted for public voting. On July 16, based on the voting results and expert review, 16 candidate spots were selected. The final list was officially announced on August 3.

- Taying Huacheng (Chinese: 塔映花城; pinyin: tǎ yìng huāchéng; lit. 'Tower Reflected in Flower City'): Canton Tower, Guangzhou Art Museum, Flower City Square, Nocturnal Charm of the Pearl River, Haizhu Wetland, Guangzhou Cultural Center
- Yunshan Diecui (Chinese: 云山叠翠; pinyin: yúnshān diécuì; lit. 'Emerald Layers of Cloudy Mountain'): Baiyun Mountain, Yunluo Botanical Garden, Yunxi Botanical Garden
- Yuexiu Fenghua (Chinese: 越秀风华; pinyin: yuèxiù fēnghuá; lit. 'Vibrant Charm of Yuexiu'): Beijing Road, Museum of the Nanyue King Mausoleum, Yuexiu Park, Sun Yat-sen Memorial Hall
- Liwan Shengjing (Chinese: 荔湾胜境; pinyin: lìwān shèngjìng; lit. 'Scenic Beauty of Liwan'): Yongqing Fang, Chen Clan Ancestral Hall, White Goose Tan, Greater Bay Area Art Center, Shamian Island
- Nansha Xuri (Chinese: 南沙旭日; pinyin: nánshā xùrì; lit. 'Sunrise over Nansha'): Nansha Mazu Temple, Puzhou Garden, Nansha Binhai Park, Nansha Wetland Park
- Huangpu Yunfan (Chinese: 黄埔云帆; pinyin: huángpǔ yúnfān; lit. 'Cloud Sails of Huangpu'): Nanhai Temple, Whampoa Military Academy
- Huanle Changlong (Chinese: 欢乐长隆; pinyin: huānlè chánglóng; lit. 'Happy Chimelong'): Guangzhou Chimelong Tourist Resort
- Liuxi Yanzhu (Chinese: 流溪烟渚; pinyin: liúxī yānzhǔ; lit. 'Misty Islets of Liuxi'): Liuxi River National Forest Park, Conghua Hot Spring Tourist Resort, China National Archives of Publications and Culture - Guangzhou Branch

== Gallery ==
Woodcuts of the Eight Sights from Transcripts of Ancient Manuscripts on Yangcheng in the Qianlong era
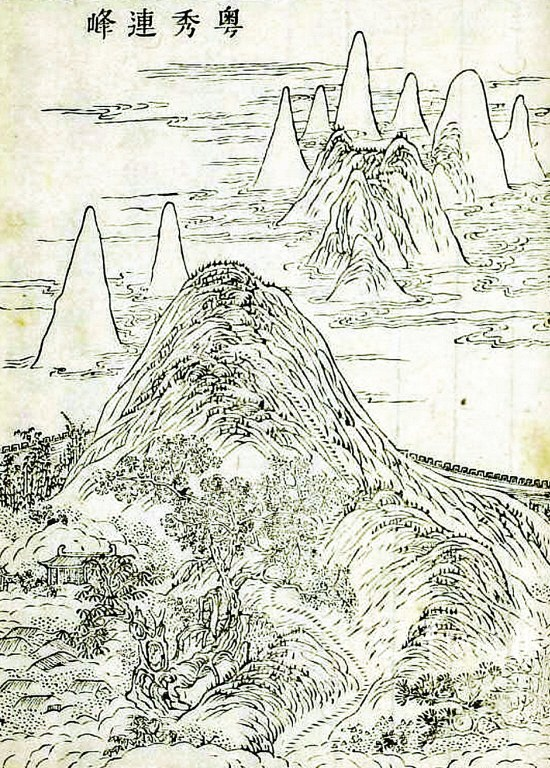
Yuexiu Lianfeng

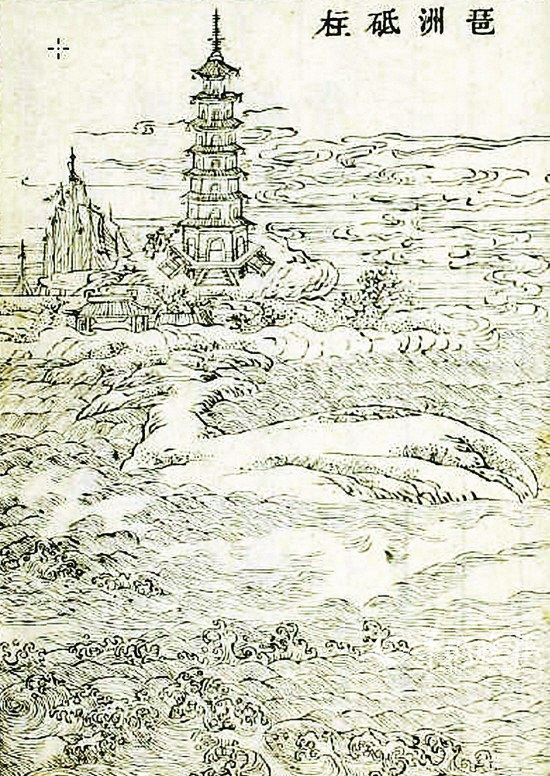
Pazhou Dizhu

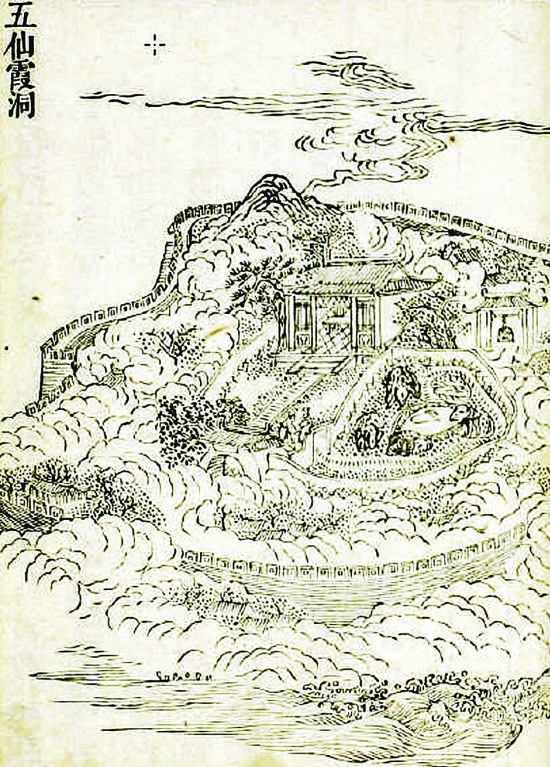
5 Immortals Grotto

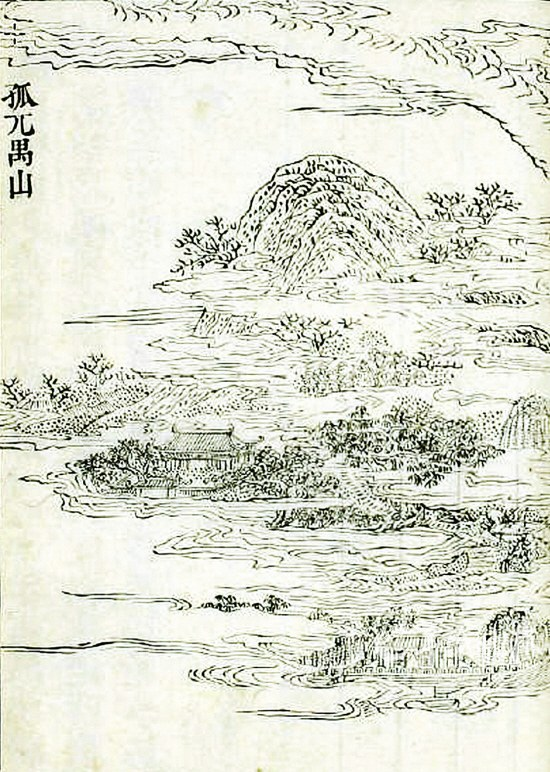
Guwu Yushan

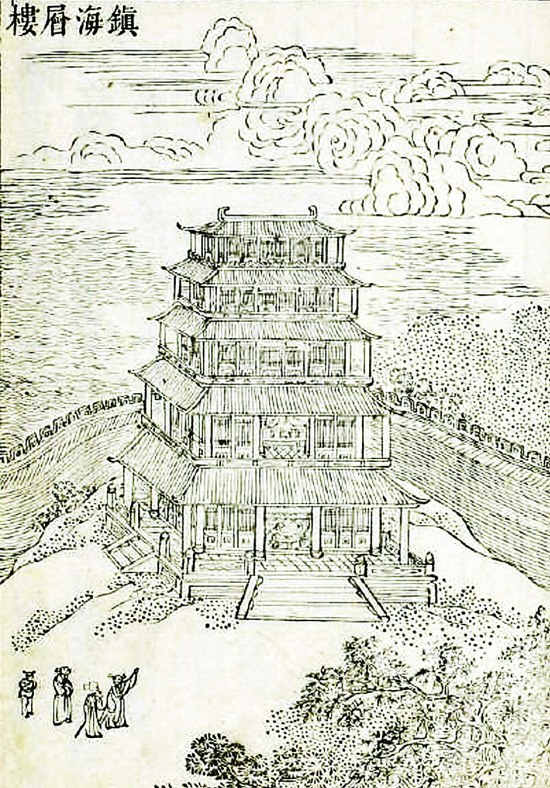
Zhenhai Cenglou

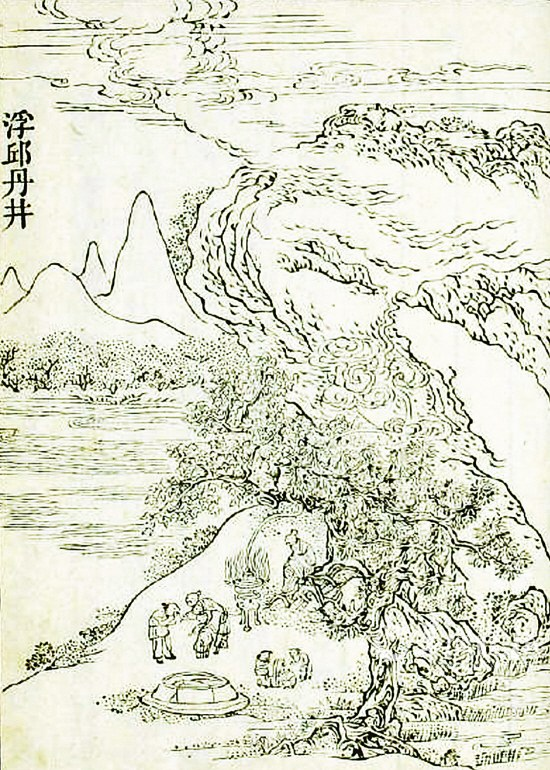
Fuqiu Danjing

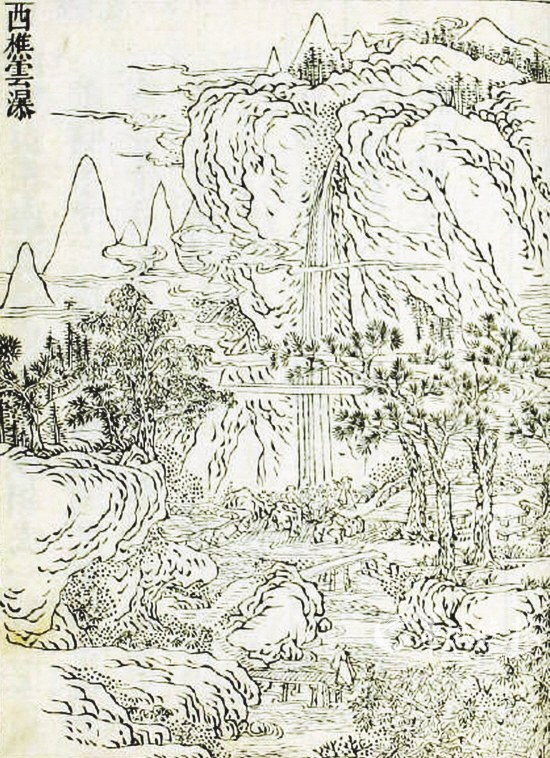
Xiqiao Yunpu

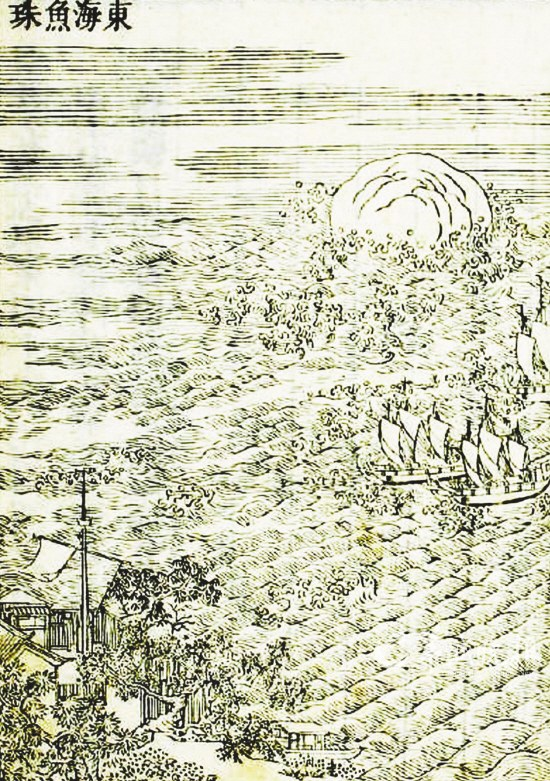
Donghai Yuzhu
Woodcuts of the Eight Sights in the mid to late Qing dynasty
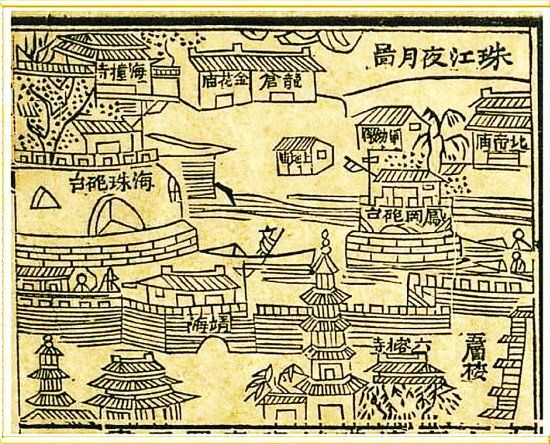
Zhujiang Yeyue

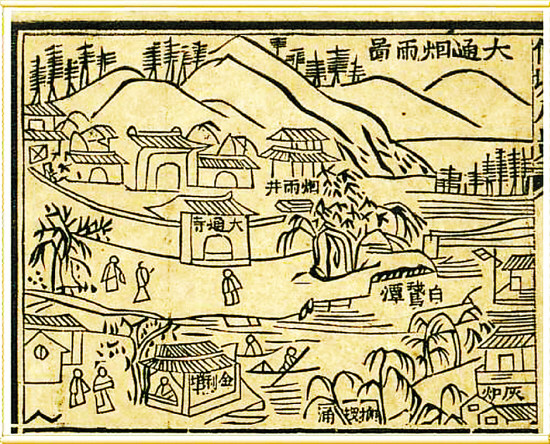
Datong Yanyu

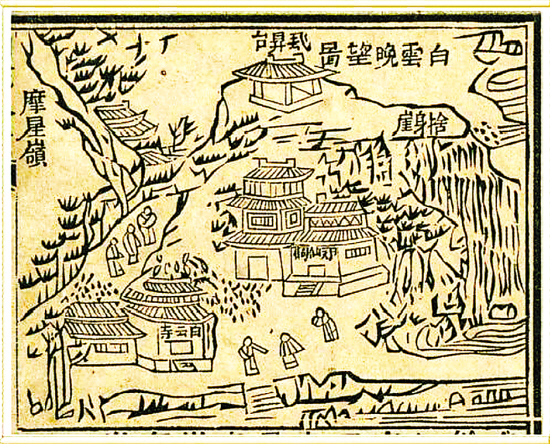
Baiyun Wanwang

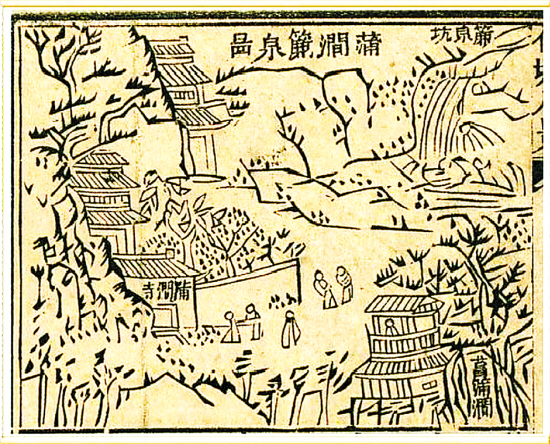
Pujian Lianquan

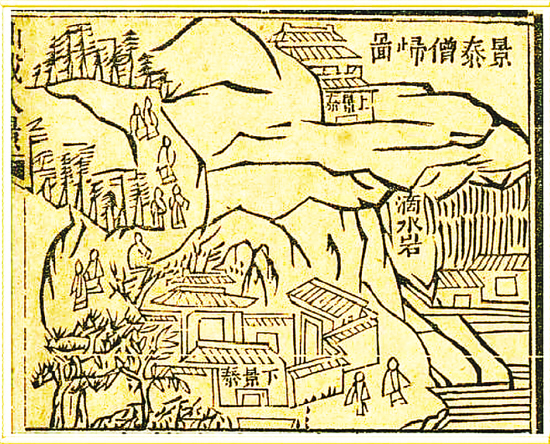
Jingtai Senggui

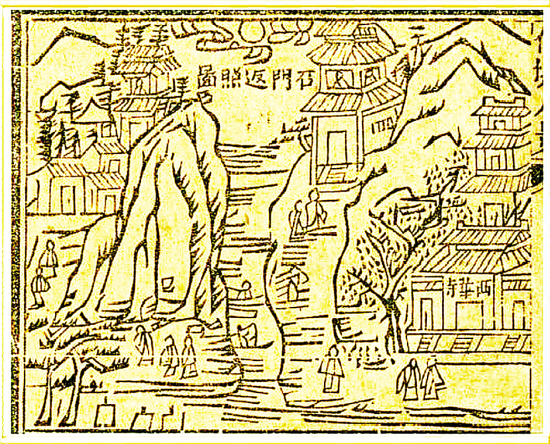
Shimen Fanzhao

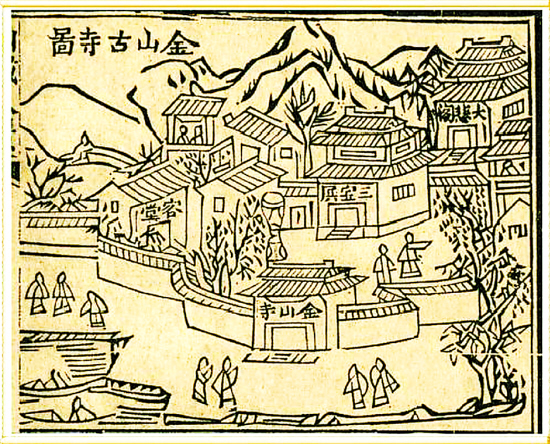
Jinshan Gusi

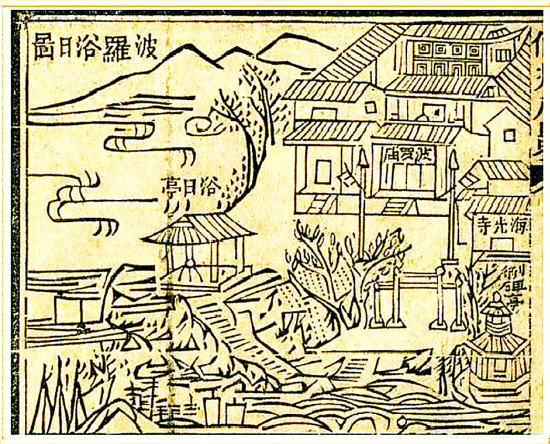
Boluo Yuri

== See also ==
- Other Eight Views around China, Japan, &c.
