= Nanhai Shimen Middle School =

Boarding school in Foshan, Guangdong, China

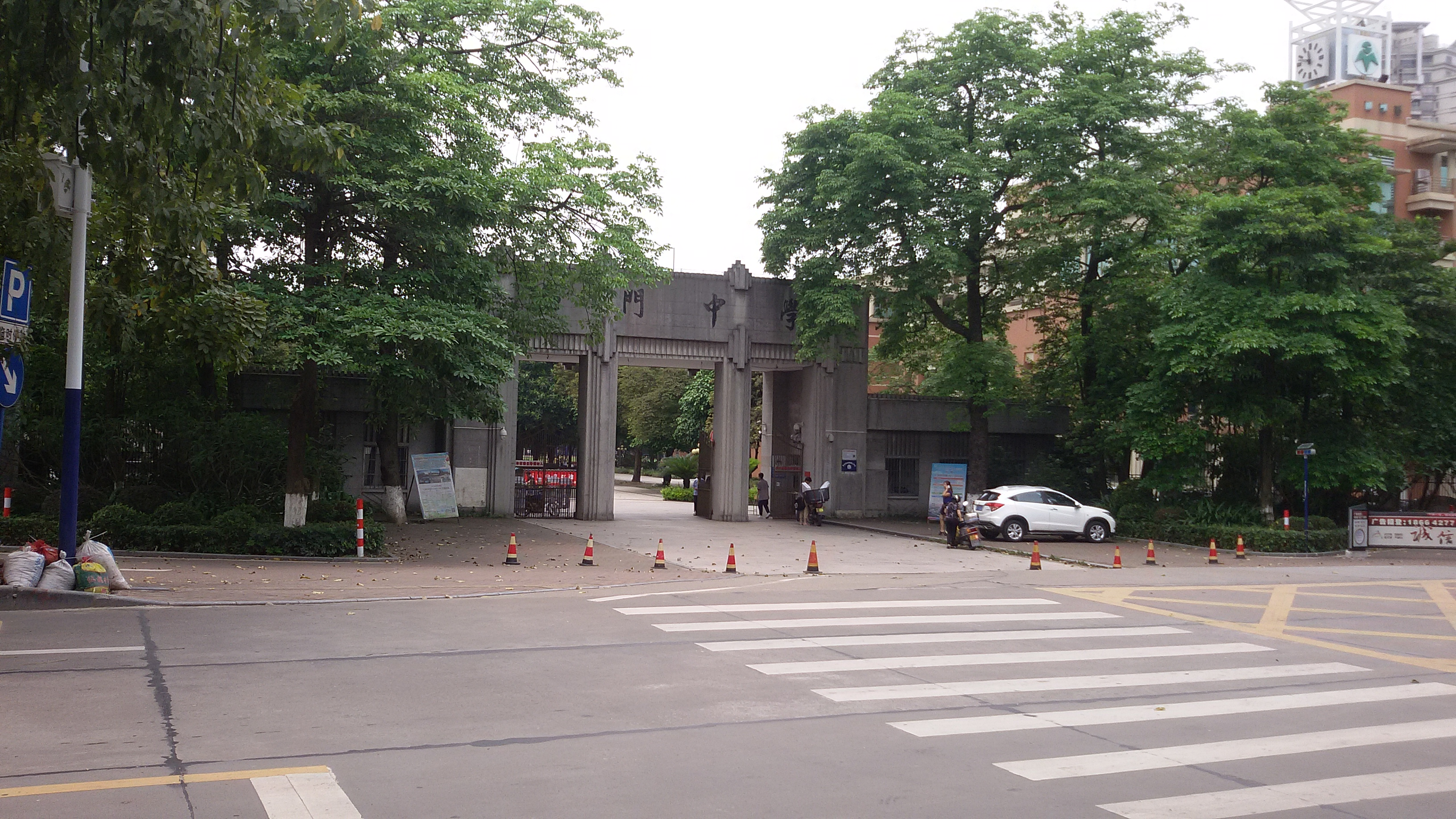
- Chinese: 南海石门中学
- Literal meaning: High School in Nanhai, Foshan
Transcriptions
Standard Mandarin
- Hanyu Pinyin: nán hǎi shí mén zhōng xué

Nanhai Shimen Middle School (南海石门中学) is a boarding school in Nanhai, Foshan. It was founded in 1932. In 1933, it was awarded as the first level school of Guangdong Province. At the beginning, Shimen was built in Lishui, Nanhai. In 1935, Shimen moved to Beicun. The school experienced the Second Sino-Japanese War and the Cultural Revolution; Shimen continued to educate students.

== Background ==
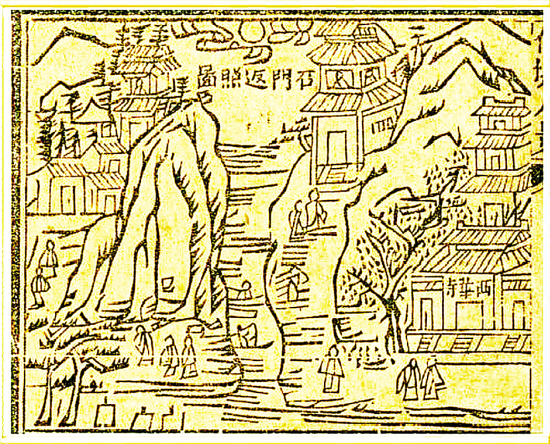
Shimen Fanzhao Tu

The name "Shimen" comes from "Shimen Fanzhao" (石门返照), one of eight sights of Guangzhou. In the Song, Yuang and Qing Dynasties, Shimen Fanzhao was recorded as the famous sights of Guangzhou in the Annals of Nanhai County and the Annals of Guangzhou Prefecture.

== Symbols ==
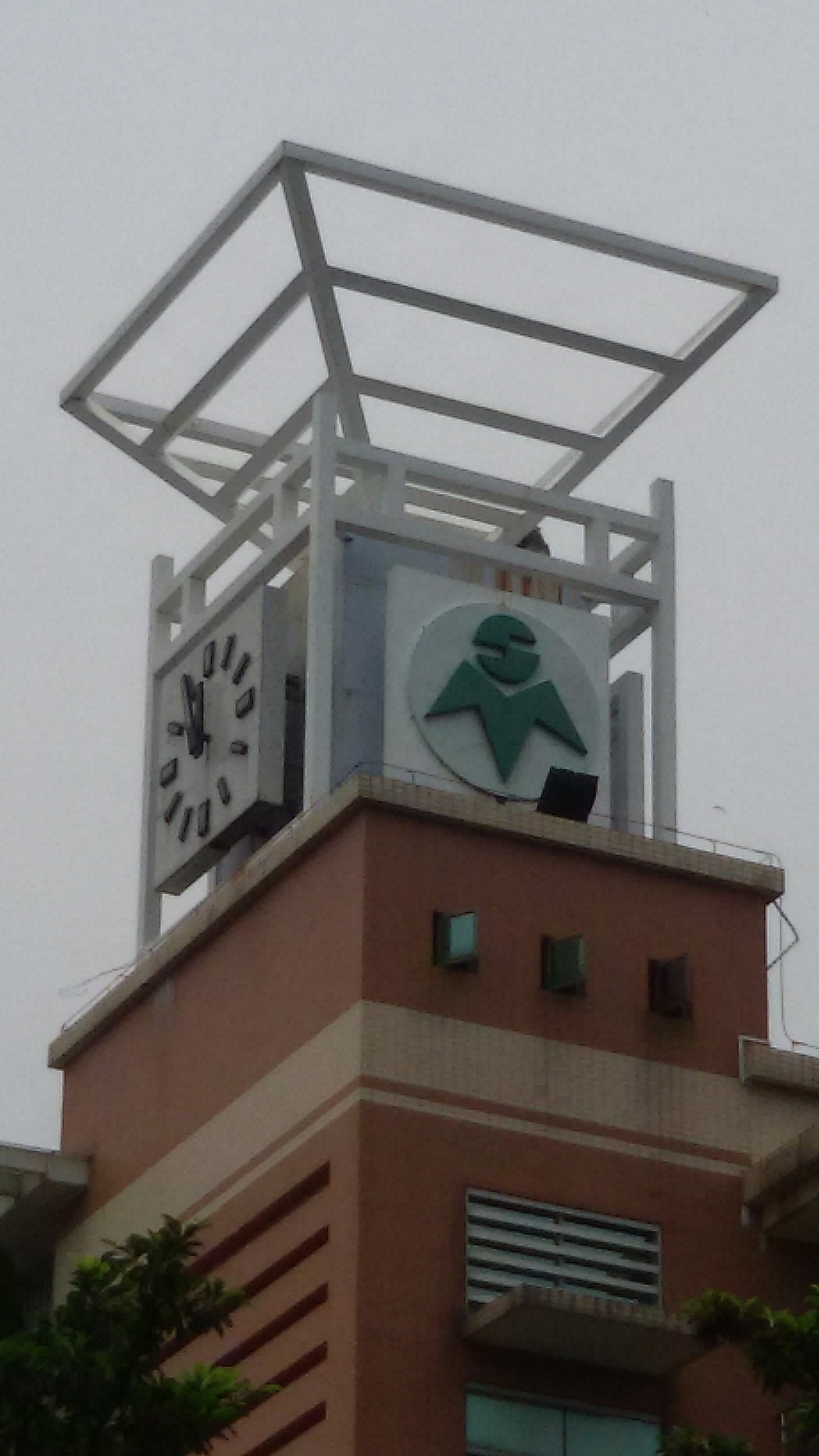
School Tower showing the badge

=== Badge ===
The badge of Shimen Middle School is green. Observing it from top to bottom, it can be seen to be an abbreviated description of Shimen. The top part means education should be like spiral forward. The other part has three angles meaning students should develop their morality, intelligence and physique.

=== Motto ===
Shimen Middle School has a motto:

"You have a heavy responsibility and a long road so do not forget to struggle." (This is adapted from "An educated gentleman cannot but be resolute and broad-minded, for he has taken up a heavy responsibility and a long course.") —Confucius.

=== Song ===
Shimen has a school song called "The Most Beautiful Shimen." Its lyrics were created by Deng Yaobang, one of Shimen's graduates. He is a senior planner who has created many famous songs for Foshan.

== International ==
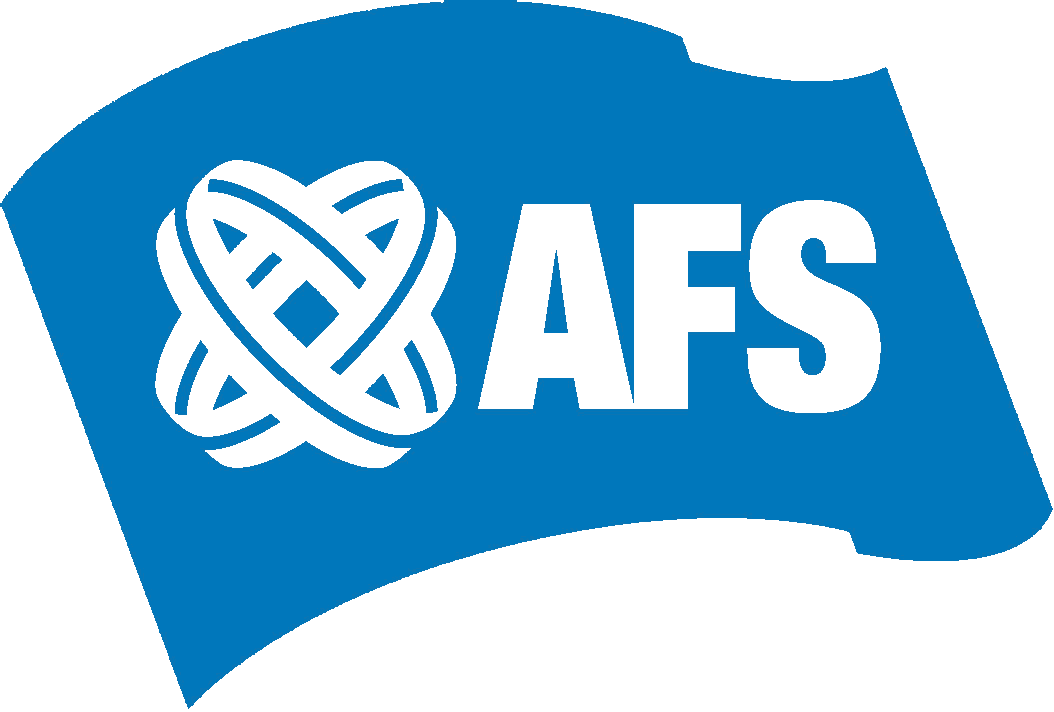
AFS logo

=== Exchange ===
From 2005, Shimen has been a member of AFS Intercultural Programs (AFS) and has sent more than 40 students to the United States, France, Germany, Italy and many other countries as exchange students. Students study in local schools and live with local families for a year. Students from other countries can study at Shimen and live in Nanhai.

=== Teachers ===
Shimen sets a special first-year course for students. Foreign teachers will share life experiences, teach students to perform a drama, and show some American or British TV series in this course.

In 2016, Shimen employed Neil, a British person who graduated from Oxford and has taught in Shimen for 13 years, as the director of the student development center. It is a bold attempt to train students' international vision.

== Achievements ==
=== Gaokao ===
- 2016: 931 students (over 90%) exceeded the mark of the key universities.
- 2015: 868 students (over 84%) exceeded the mark of the key universities.
- 2014: 848 students (over 82%) exceeded the mark of the key universities.
- 2013: 786 students (over 75%) exceeded the mark of the key universities.

=== Nation Subject Olympic Competition ===
- 2015: 4 students won gold medal, 2 students won silver medal and 1 student won bronze medal in National Olympiad in Informatics in Provinces
- 2014: 41 students won the prizes in Astronomy Olympiad in Guangdong Province

=== Science Competition ===
- 2015: students won the 'Think Award' in VEX Robotics Competition in Kentucky International Convention Center

== 80th Anniversary ==
On 18 November 2012, Shimen held its 80th anniversary. Graduates came back to celebrate this day. Other middle schools sent blessing. There were many activities and performances. The Governor of Guangdong Province, Zhu Xiaodan, wrote a congratulation letter which encouraged Shimen to make more contributions to Guangdong in the education arena.
