= Haizhu Square =

Public square in Guangzhou, China

Coordinates: 23.1173°N 113.2616°E

- Traditional Chinese: 海珠廣場
- Simplified Chinese: 海珠广场
Transcriptions
Standard Mandarin
- Hanyu Pinyin: Hǎizhū Guǎngchǎng
- Bopomofo: ㄏㄞˇ ㄓㄨ ㄍㄨㄤˇ ㄔㄤˇ
- Wade–Giles: Hai^{3}-chu^{1} Kuang^{3}-ch‘ang^{3}
- IPA: [xàɪ.ʈʂú kwàŋ.ʈʂʰàŋ]
Yue: Cantonese
- Yale Romanization: Hóijyū Gwóngchèuhng
- Jyutping: hoi2 zyu1 gwong2 coeng4
- IPA: [hɔj˧˥.tsy˥ kʷɔŋ˧˥.tsʰœŋ˩]

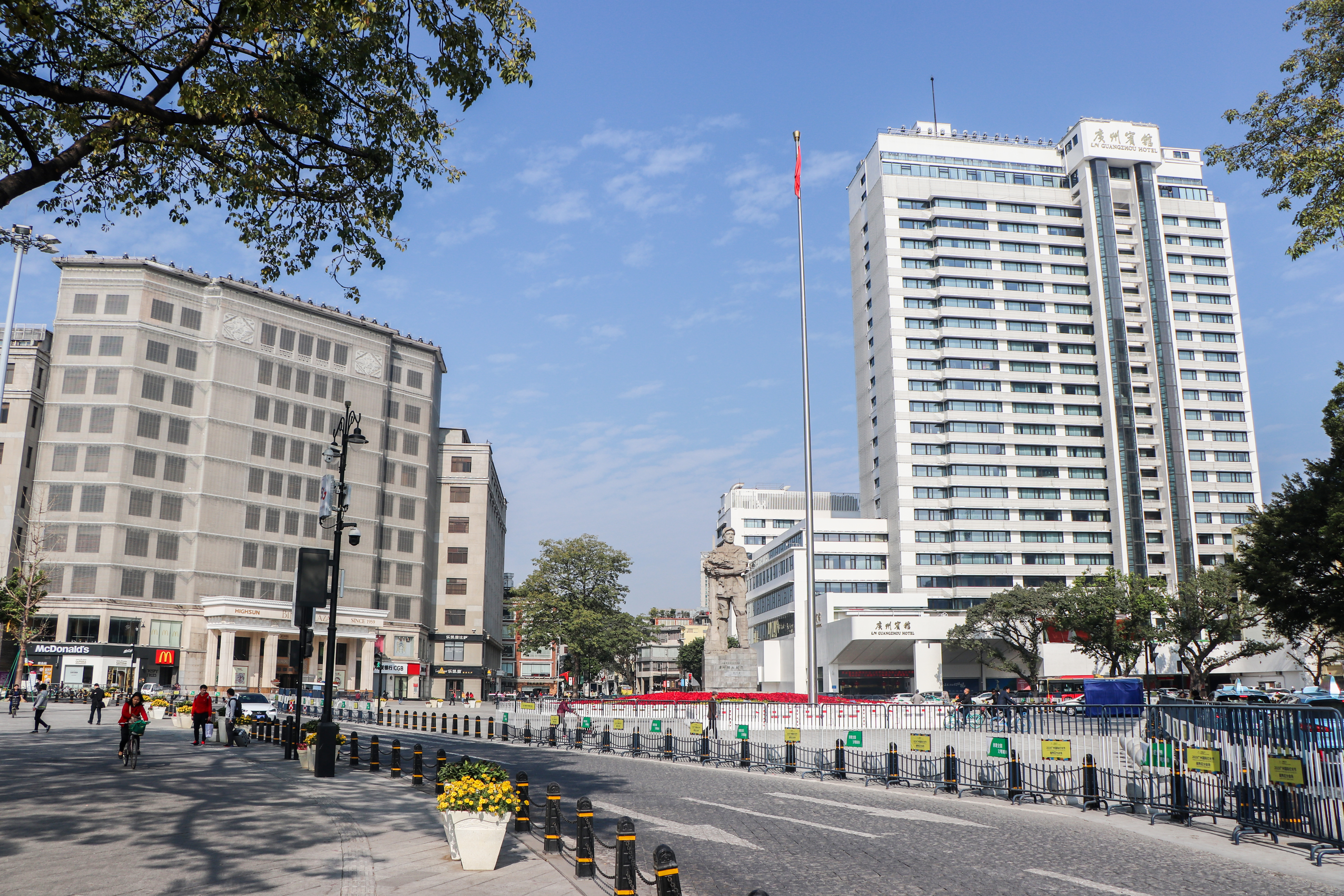
Haizhu Square in 2019

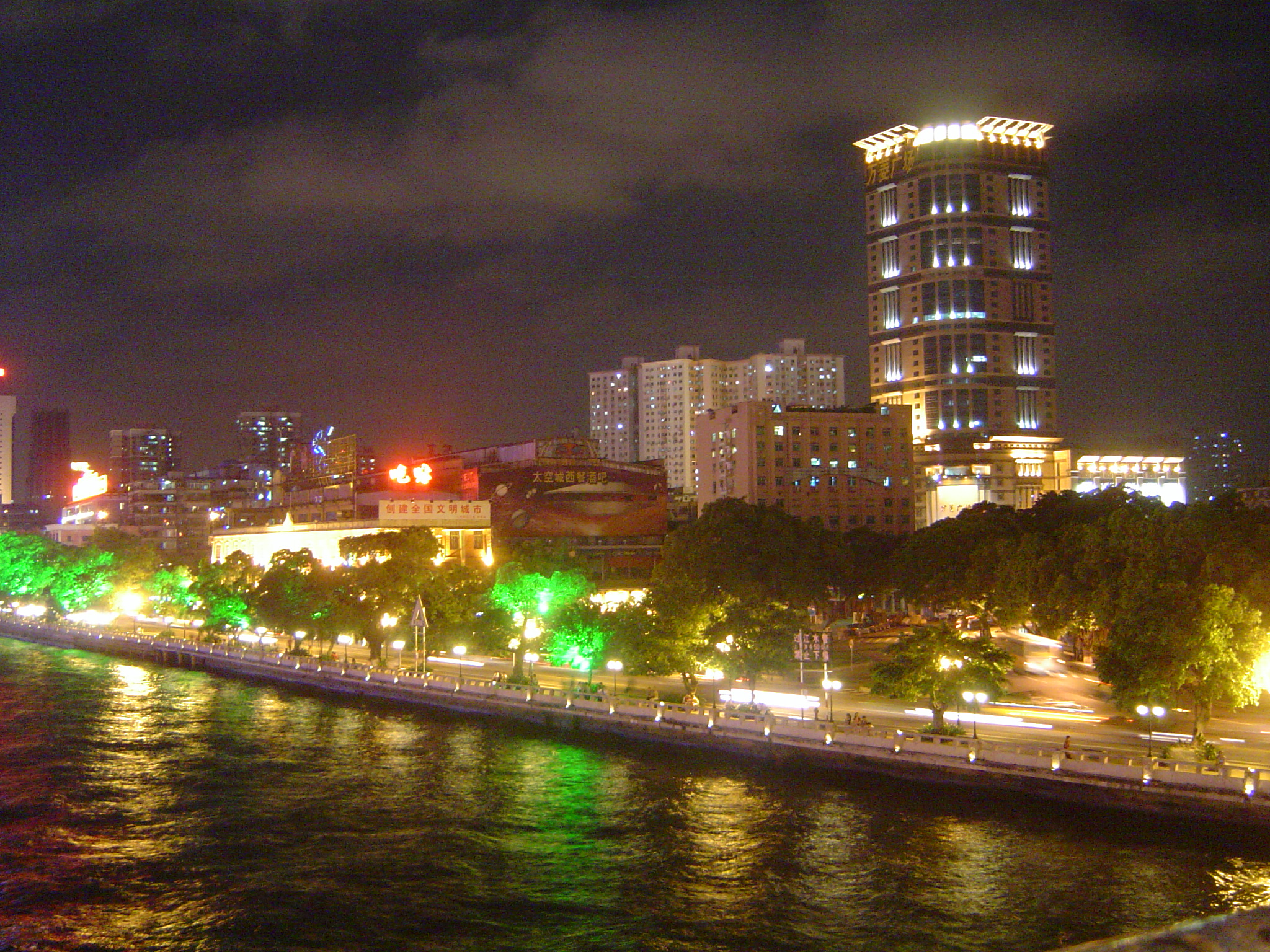
Night view of Haizhu Square

Haizhu Square (Chinese: 海珠广场; Cantonese Yale: Hóijyū Gwóngchèuhng; pinyin: Hǎizhū Guǎngchǎng) is a public square located in Yuexiu District, Guangzhou, China. It is located on the riverfront. Its centrepiece is the Guangzhou Liberation Statue, erected in 1959. In 1963 the square and its environs were named as one of the Eight Sights of Guangzhou.

Haizhu Square Station of the Guangzhou Metro is located in the square.
