= Nansha Wetland Park =

Public park in Guangzhou, China

Coordinates: 22°36′25″N 113°38′16″E

- Traditional Chinese: 南沙濕地公園
- Simplified Chinese: 南沙湿地公园
- Literal meaning: South Sands Wetlands Public Park
Transcriptions
Standard Mandarin
- Hanyu Pinyin: Nánshā Shīdì Gōngyuán

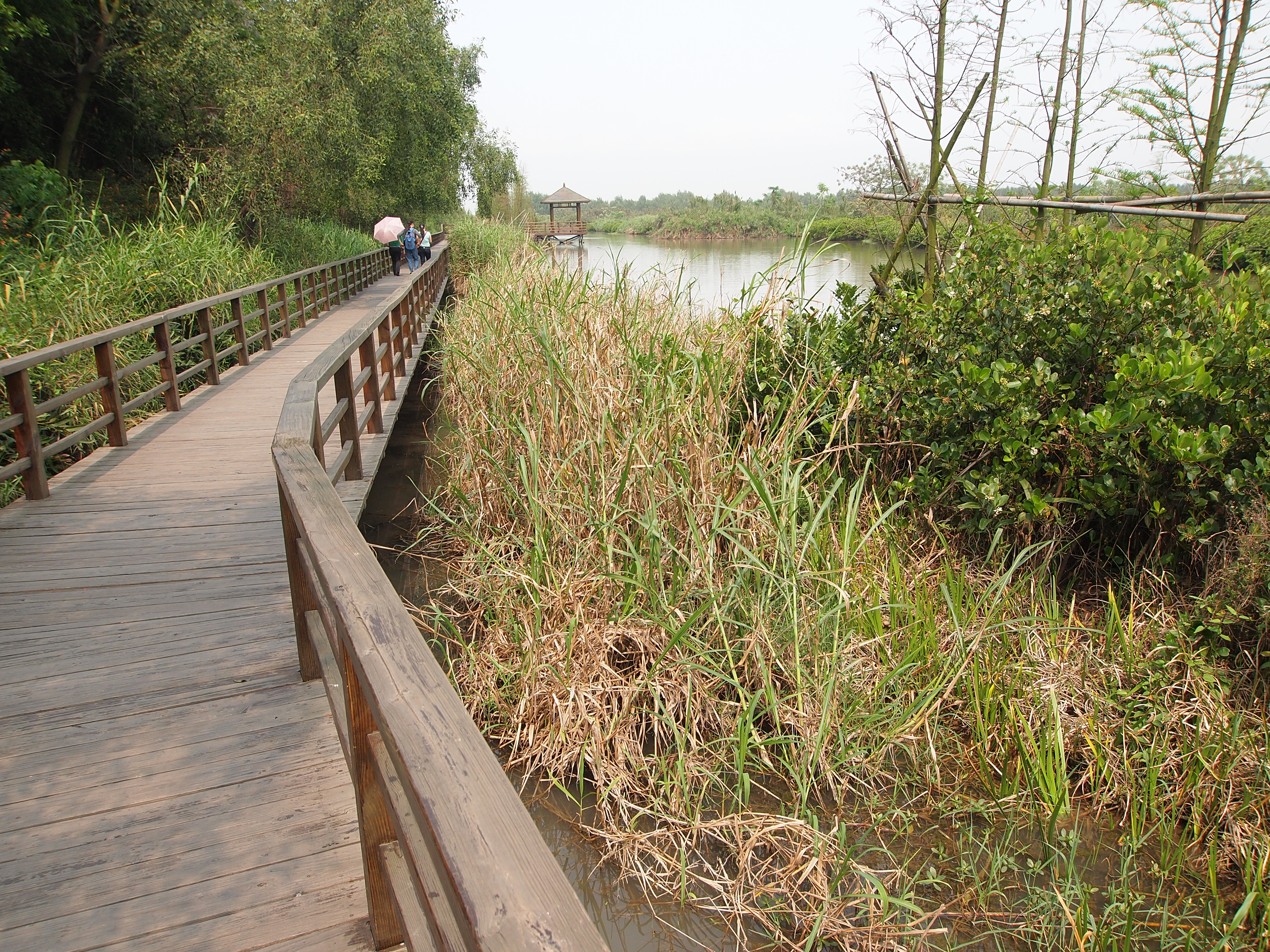
A view of Nansha Wetland Park

Nansha Wetland Park is a man-made public park in Wanqingsha (万顷沙镇) in the Nansha District of Guangzhou, China.

== Names ==
Nansha Wetland Park is sometimes known as "the kidney of Guangzhou" and as the "Paradise of Birds".

== Grounds ==
The tourist area of the park is located on an estuary on the west bank of the Pearl River. The "Wetlands Singing at Night" is currently one of the city's Eight Sights. 141 known species of migrant birds visit the wetlands each year. In the summer, water lilies cover the entire surface of the area. In addition, fish, shrimp, and crabs live throughout the park, as do lotus, bananas, and sugarcane. To avoid disturbing the birds, visitors by boat are limited to 150 per day.

The park abuts the city's port and industries including steel, shipbuilding, and petrochemicals. The people of Guangzhou once swam in the Pearl River but at its worst pollution has turned its waters black and putrid. In 2009–10, municipal leaders spent $6,000,000,000 on treatment and a massive refinery (a joint venture between Sinopec and the Kuwait Petroleum Co.) was relocated out of Nansha District, which municipal planners aim to make 50% forest, grass, or wetlands.

== Transportation ==
The nearest Guangzhou Metro station is Jiaomen Station.
