= Baiyun Mountain (Guangdong) =

Mountain in Guangdong, China

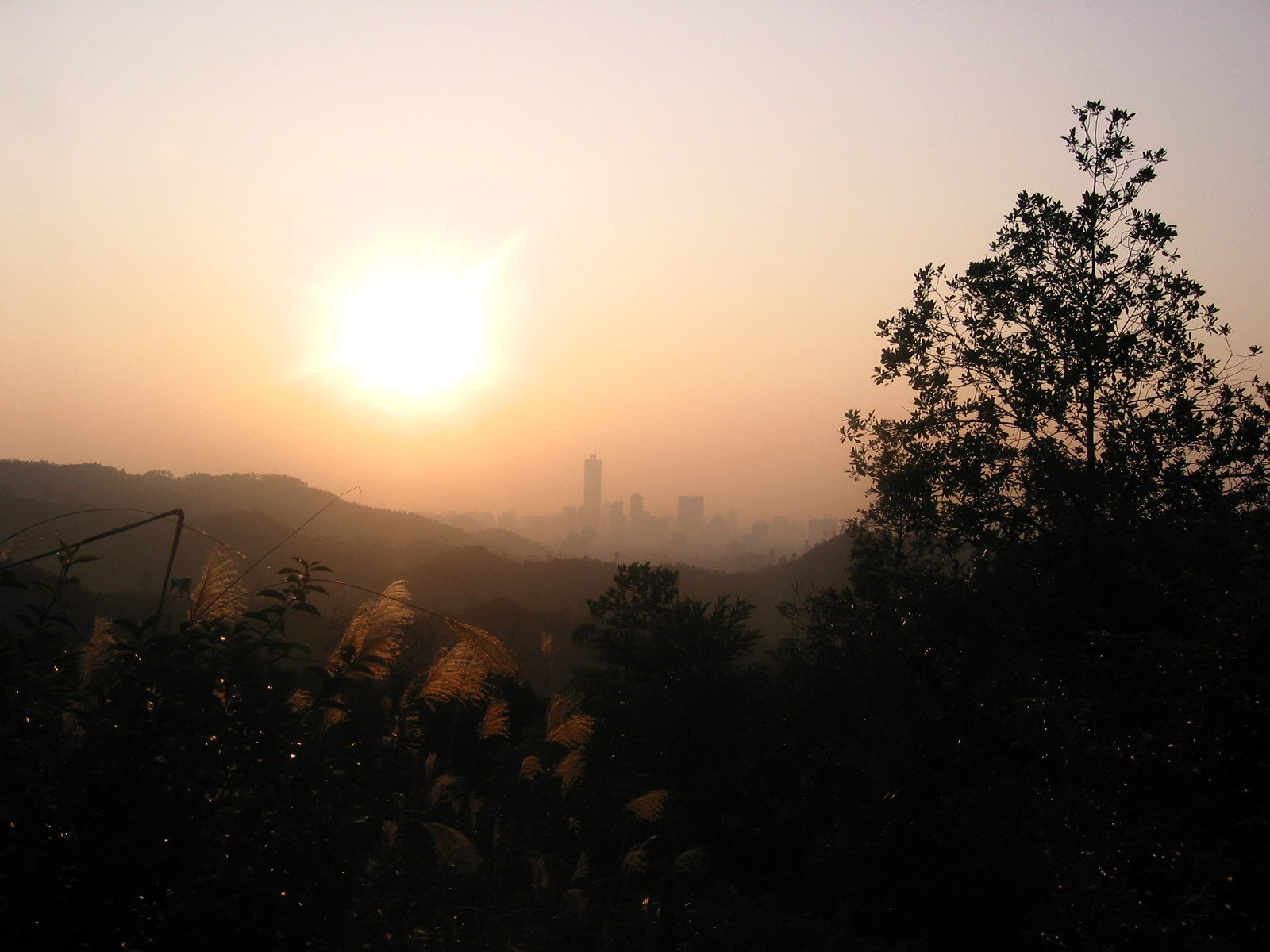
- Baiyun with Zhujiang New Town in the distance

Highest point
- Elevation: 427 m (1,401 ft)
- Coordinates: 23°09′28.4″N 113°17′35.9″E

Geography
- Location: Guangzhou, Guangdong, China

Baiyun Mountain
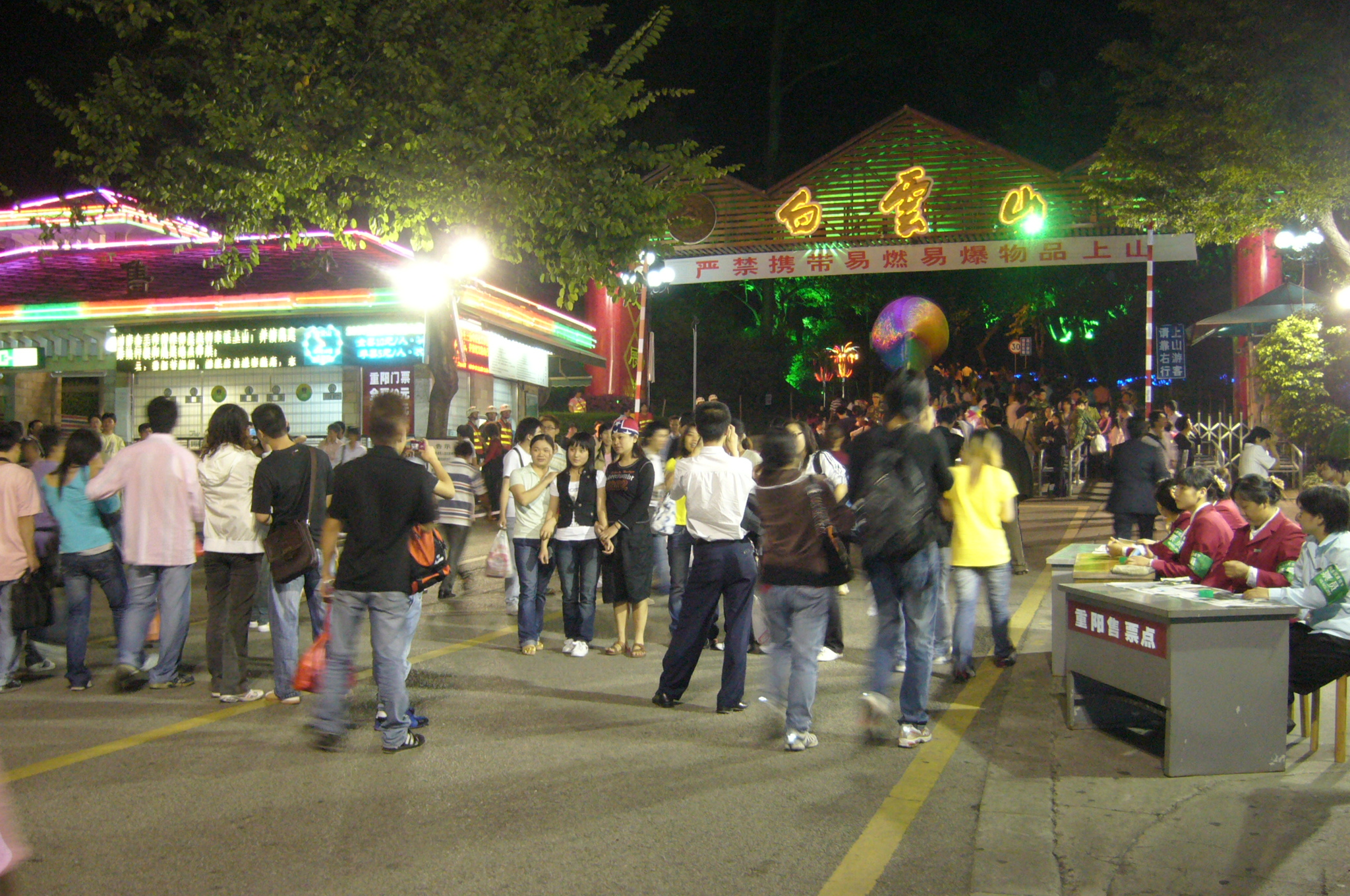
- Entrance to the Baiyun Scenic Area
- Simplified Chinese: 白云山
- Traditional Chinese: 白雲山
- Jyutping: Baak6 wan4 Saan1
- Cantonese Yale: Baahkwàhn Sāan
- Hanyu Pinyin: Báiyúnshān
- Postal: Pakwan Mountain
- Literal meaning: White Cloud Mountain
Transcriptions
Standard Mandarin
- Hanyu Pinyin: Báiyúnshān
Yue: Cantonese
- Yale Romanization: Baahkwàhn Sāan
- Jyutping: Baak6 wan4 Saan1

Alternative Chinese name
- Simplified Chinese: 云山
- Traditional Chinese: 雲山
- Jyutping: Wan4 saan1
- Cantonese Yale: Wàhnsāan
- Hanyu Pinyin: Yúnshān
- Literal meaning: Cloudy Mountain
Transcriptions
Standard Mandarin
- Hanyu Pinyin: Yúnshān
Yue: Cantonese
- Yale Romanization: Wàhnsāan
- Jyutping: Wan4 saan1

Baiyun Mountain, also known as White Cloud Mountain, is a mountain located a few miles to the north of Guangzhou, China. It has a height of 427 metres (1,401 ft).

== Name ==
Báiyún is Mandarin Chinese for "White Clouds", derived from views of the mountain's peaks shrouded in mist during late Spring or after a rain. Its former English name, Pakwan (Jyutping: baak6 wan4), is a form of the Cantonese pronunciation of the same name. In English, it is also known as White Cloud Mountain, Mount Baiyun, Baiyun Shan, or—since the "mountain" is, properly speaking, a "mountain range"—the "Baiyun Mountains".

Baiyun is informally known as the "City's Lung" (市肺), from its greenery. It is also acclaimed as the "First Beauty in Guangzhou" (羊城第一秀) or the "Most Famous Mountain South of Ling" (嶺南第一名山). Moxing Peak, its highest point, is similarly sometimes called the "First Peak under the Southern Sky" (天南第一峰).

== History ==
Scenes on Baiyun Mountain named in Eight Sights of Guangzhou
Time	Chinese	English
Song Dynasty	蒲涧帘泉	Lianquan Fountain at Cattail Gully
Yuan Dynasty	蒲间濂泉	Lianquan Fountain at Cattail Gully
Yuan Dynasty	白云晚望	Evening Vista from Baiyun
Yuan Dynasty	景泰僧归	Jingtai's Returning Monks
1963	白云松涛	Baiyun's Pine Sea
1986	云山锦绣	Cloudy Mountain's Grandeur
2002	云山叠翠	Cloudy Mountain's Lush Greenery
2011	云山叠翠	Cloudy Mountain, Green and Tidy

Baiyun Mountain has been famed as a scenic spot since ancient times. Its visitors predated the foundation of Panyu (now Guangzhou) in 214 BC, with various celebrities of the Warring States period (5th–3rd centuries BC) known to have traveled there. Its beauty was again celebrated during the 3rd–5th century Jin dynasty and the 7th–9th century Tang. Since the Song, various scenes at Baiyun have been named among the Eight Sights of Ram City, lists of Guangzhou's loveliest spots. However, few of the historical sites have survived to the present day and others—such as the view of Guangzhou's old walled city at dusk—have changed drastically as the city has expanded to and around the mountain.

In its most recent years, Baiyun has become home to a small Kung Fu community. Baiyun Kung Fu or White Cloud Kung Fu. Named after the landscape they train in.

== Gallery ==
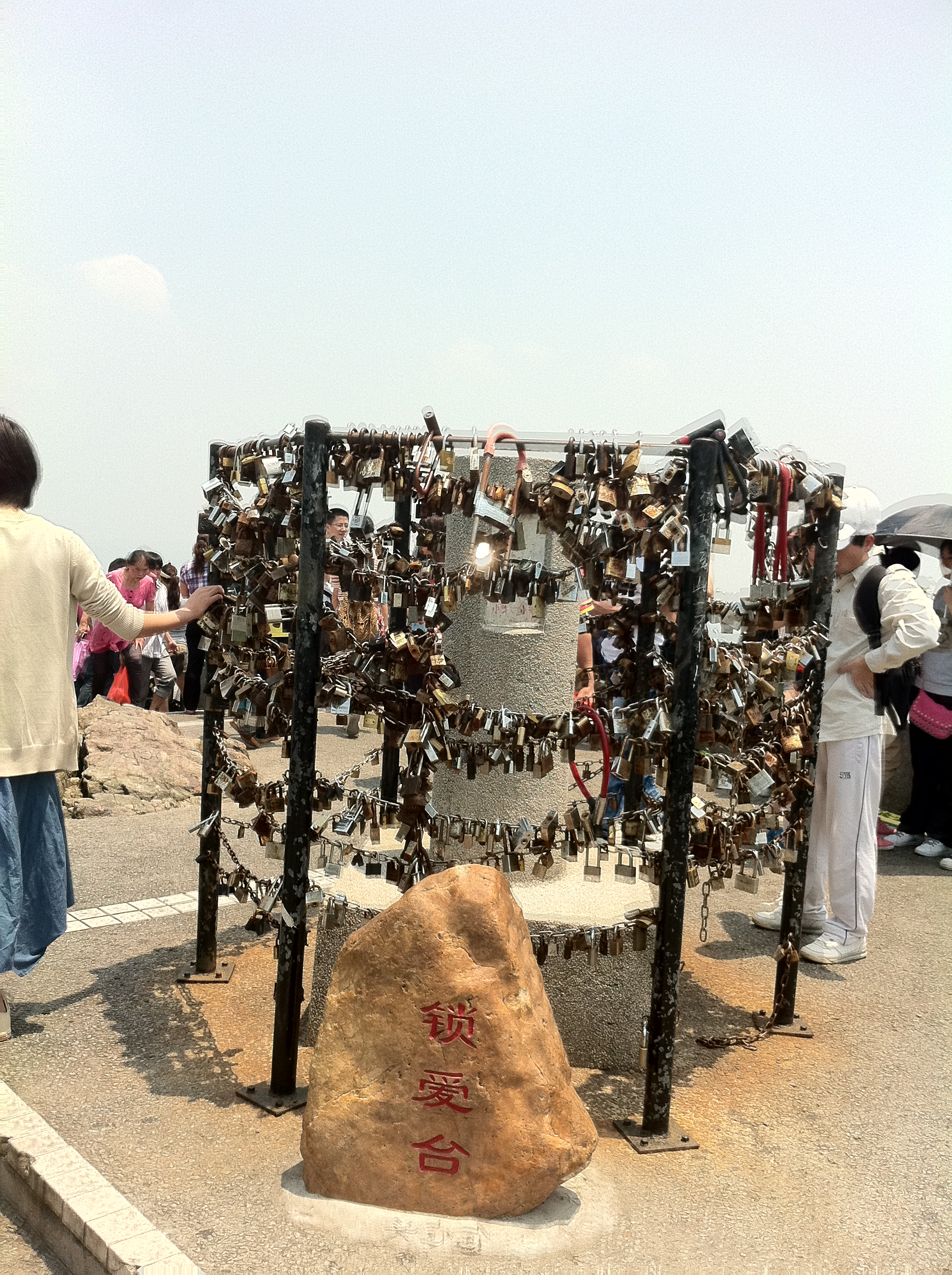
Suoai Tai

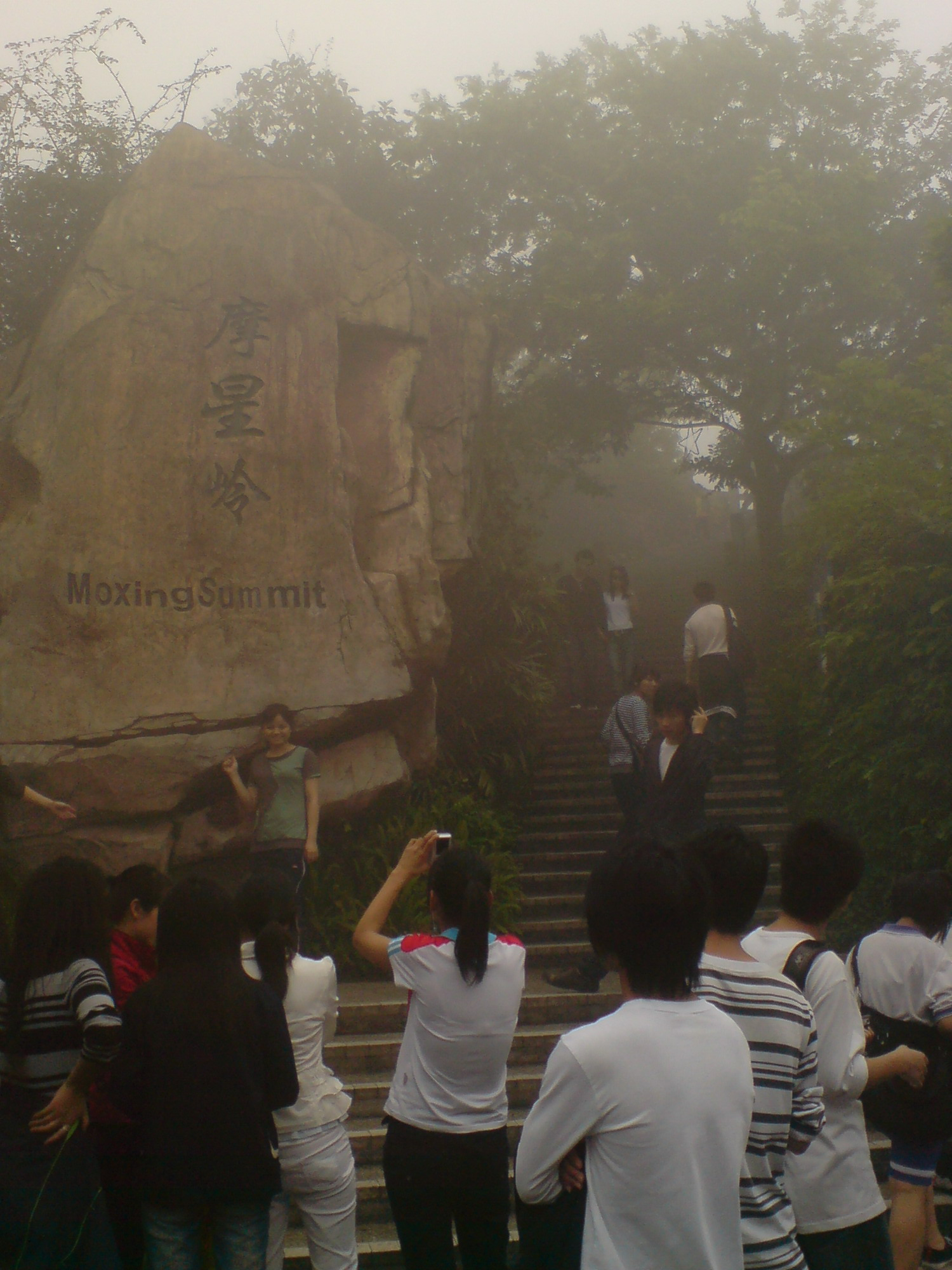
The entrance to Moxing Peak

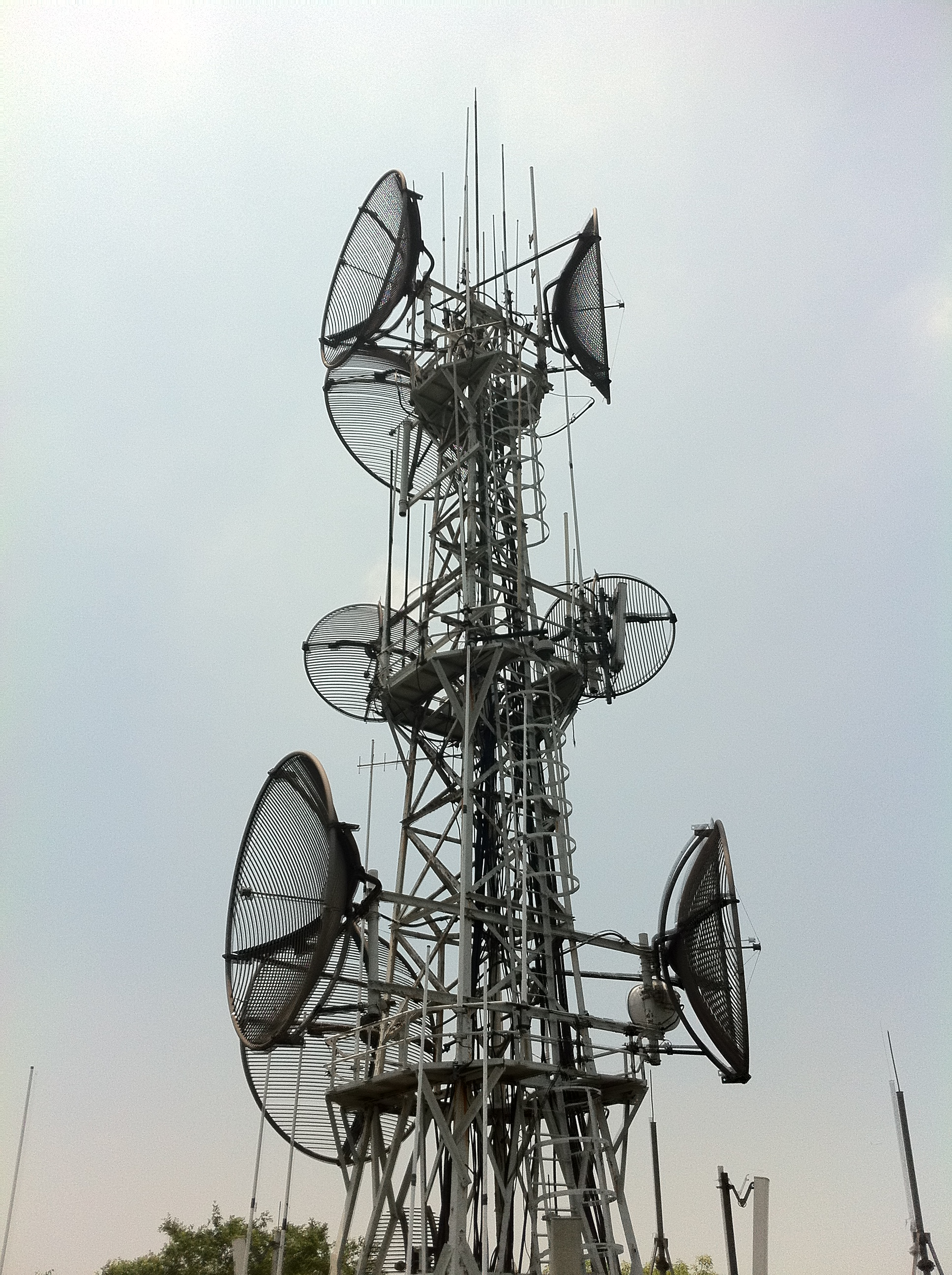
China Mobile's telecom tower

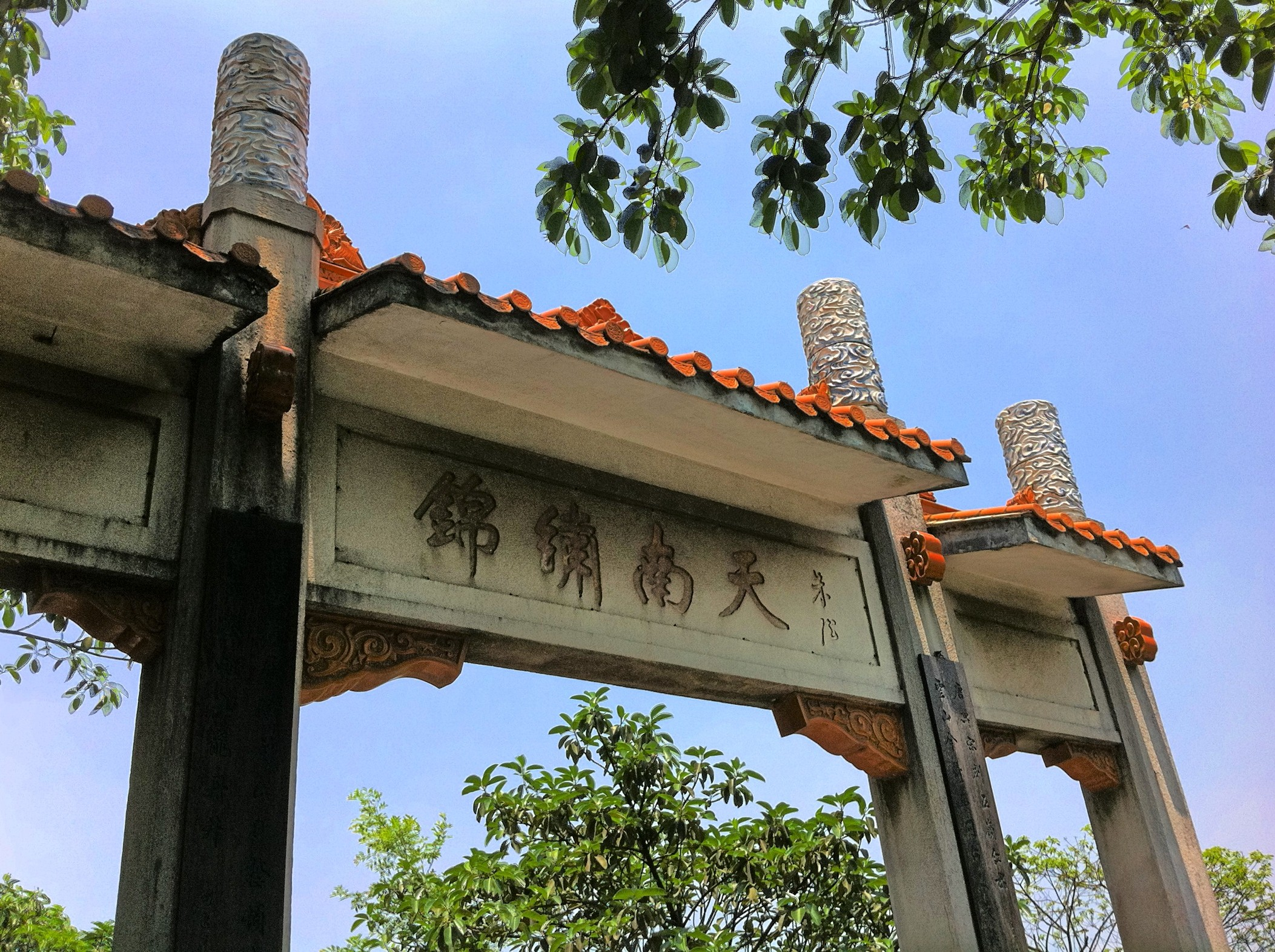
The Beautiful Southern Sky (锦绣南天, Jinxiu Nantian) Memorial Arch

== Wildlife ==
The White Cloud Mountain minnow, now a popular aquarium fish worldwide, was discovered in this area in the 1930s.
