= Teng Xiu =

Eastern Wu and Jin dynasty general (died 288)

- 滕脩

Governor of Guang Province (廣州牧)
- In office ? – 288
- Monarch: Emperor Wu of Jin
- In office 279 – 280
- Monarch: Sun Hao

General Who Stabilises the South (安南將軍)
- In office ? – 288
- Monarch: Emperor Wu of Jin

General Who Guards the South (鎮南將軍)
- In office 279 – 280
- Monarch: Sun Hao

Inspector of Guang Province (廣州刺史)
- In office ? – 279
- Monarch: Sun Hao
- Preceded by: Xiong Mu

Personal details
- Born: Unknown Nanzhao County, Henan
- Died: 288 Guangzhou, Guangdong
- Occupation: General
- Courtesy name: Xianxian (顯先)
- Peerage: Marquis of Wudang (武當侯)

Teng Xiu (Note: His name was recorded as "Teng Xun" (滕循) in Sun Hao's biography in Sanguozhi.) (died 288), courtesy name Xianxian, posthumously known as Marquis Zhong of Wudang (武當忠侯), was a military general of the state of Eastern Wu during the late Three Kingdoms period (220–280) of China. After the fall of Wu in 280, he continued serving under the Jin dynasty. He is sometimes tied to a legend about the Temple of the Five Immortals in present-day Guangzhou, Guangdong.

== Life ==
Teng Xiu was from Xi'e County (西鄂縣), Nanyang Commandery (南陽郡), which is around present-day Nanzhao County, Henan. He started his career as an official in the state of Eastern Wu in the late Three Kingdoms period and was enfeoffed as the Marquis of Xi'e (西鄂侯) for his contributions.

During the reign of the fourth and last Wu emperor Sun Hao, Teng Xiu succeeded Xiong Mu (Note: Xiong Mu later served as a Master of Writings (尚书) in Sun Hao's court. The Jiang Biao Zhuan recorded that when the Administrator of Kuaiji Che Jun (车浚) was executed by Sun Hao in c.276, Xiong attempted to advise the emperor. Sun then ordered Xiong to be hit with the ring pommels of swords; when he died, every part of Xiong's body was wounded.) (熊睦) as the Inspector (刺史) of Guang Province (廣州) and was known for being a capable governor. After the Jiao Province Campaign, Teng Xiu was struggling to quell bandits in the south. Tao Huang, by then the Inspector of Jiaozhou, advised him, "The people of the south bank rely on our iron and salt, so you should stop them from being sold in the markets. That way, they will be deprived of their farming equipments, and in two years' time, they will be destroyed in one battle." Teng Xiu followed his advice and defeated the bandits. Around October 279, (Note: The 8th month of that year corresponds to 23 Sep to 22 Oct 279 in the Julian calendar.) after Guo Ma had started a rebellion against Wu rule in Guang Province that summer, Sun Hao ordered Teng Xiu to lead Wu imperial forces to suppress the revolt. He also promoted Teng Xiu to the rank of Governor (牧), gave him an additional appointment as General Who Guards the South (鎮南將軍), and granted him full authority and control over the military forces in Guang Province.

In December 279 or January 280, while Teng Xiu was busy dealing with the rebels, enemy forces from Eastern Wu's rival state, the Jin dynasty, invaded Wu. Teng Xiu then led troops from Guang Province to counter the invasion, but by the time he reached Baqiu (巴丘; present-day Yueyang, Hunan), Sun Hao had surrendered to the Jin dynasty, thus bringing an end to Eastern Wu's existence. Teng Xiu was so depressed that he wept and returned to Guang Province. Later, he surrendered to the Jin dynasty as well, along with Lü Feng (閭豐; the Inspector of Guang Province) and Wang Yi (王毅; the Administrator of Cangwu Commandery and father of Wang Ji).

Some time later, Emperor Wu of the Jin dynasty issued an imperial decree to appoint Teng Xiu as General Who Stabilises the South (安南將軍) and Governor of Guang Province, in addition to granting him full authority and control over Guang Province as he did during Sun Hao's reign. Emperor Wu also enfeoffed Teng Xiu as the Marquis of Wudang (武當侯). Teng Xiu died in 288. Initially, he was to be given the posthumous name "Sheng" (声). After his son Teng Bing (滕并) submitted a memorial to the throne, he was eventually given the posthumous name Zhong (忠).

== See also ==
- Lists of people of the Three Kingdoms
