= Guangzhou Twin Towers =

Pair of supertall skyscrapers in Guangzhou

- Simplified Chinese: 广州双塔 or 广州双子塔
- Traditional Chinese: 廣州雙塔 or 廣州雙子塔
Transcriptions
Standard Mandarin
- Hanyu Pinyin: Guǎngzhōu Shuāngtǎ or Guǎngzhōu Shuāngzǐtǎ
Yue: Cantonese
- Jyutping: Gwong^{2}zau^{1} Soeng^{1}taap^{3} or Gwong^{2}zau^{1} Soeng^{1}zi^{2}taap^{3}

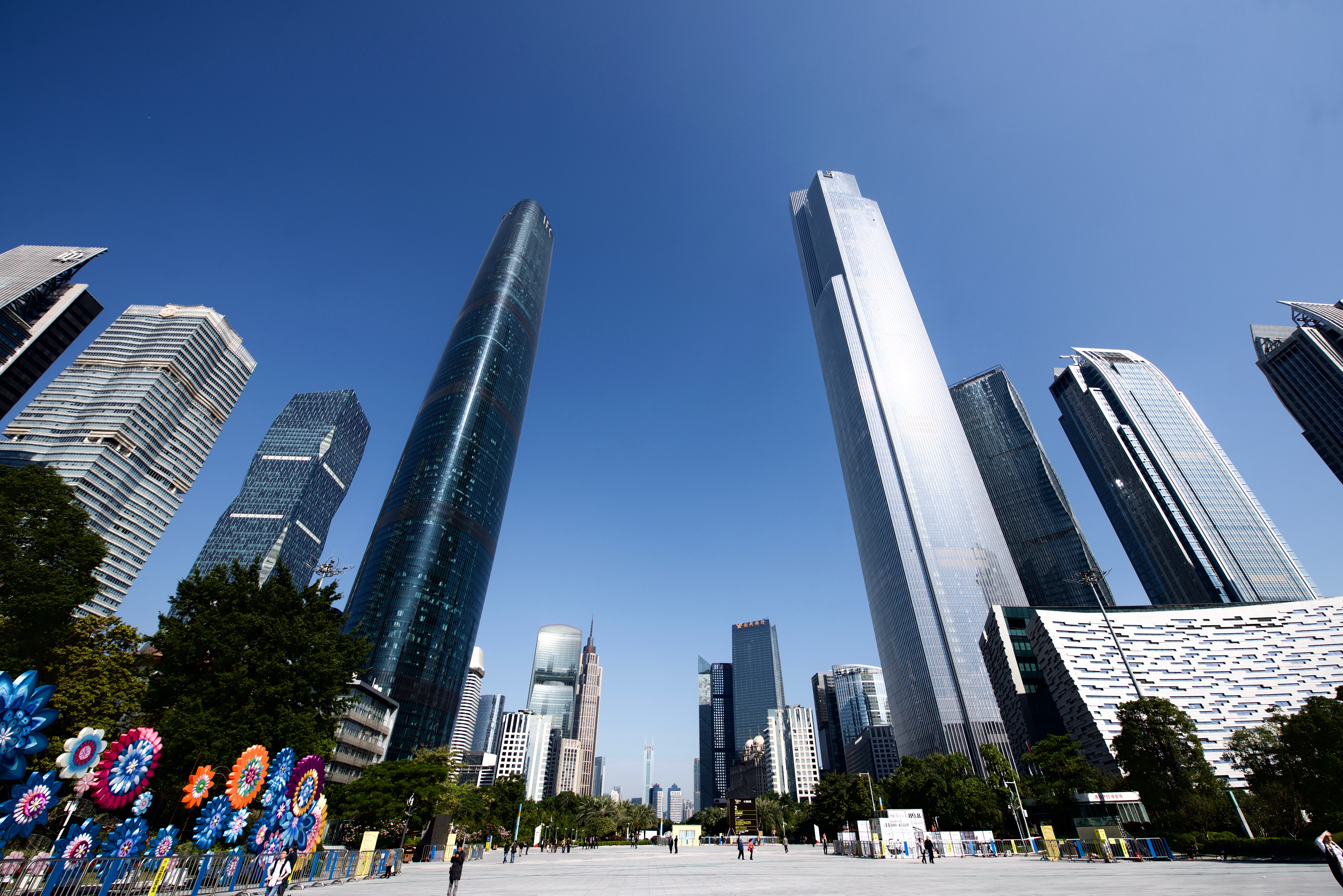
Twin Towers, between which is the Huacheng Square, on the new city central axis of Guangzhou.

Guangzhou Twin Towers (Chinese: 广州双塔 or 广州双子塔) are two skyscrapers in Guangzhou, Guangdong. They are the two tallest skyscrapers in the city.

The West Tower, Guangzhou International Finance Center, was designed by Wilkinson Eyre and the East Tower, Guangzhou Chow Tai Fook Finance Centre, by Kohn Pedersen Fox. Both towers are located at Zhujiang New Town, the city's central business district, in Tianhe District. The West Tower became operational in 2010 and the East Tower opened in 2016.

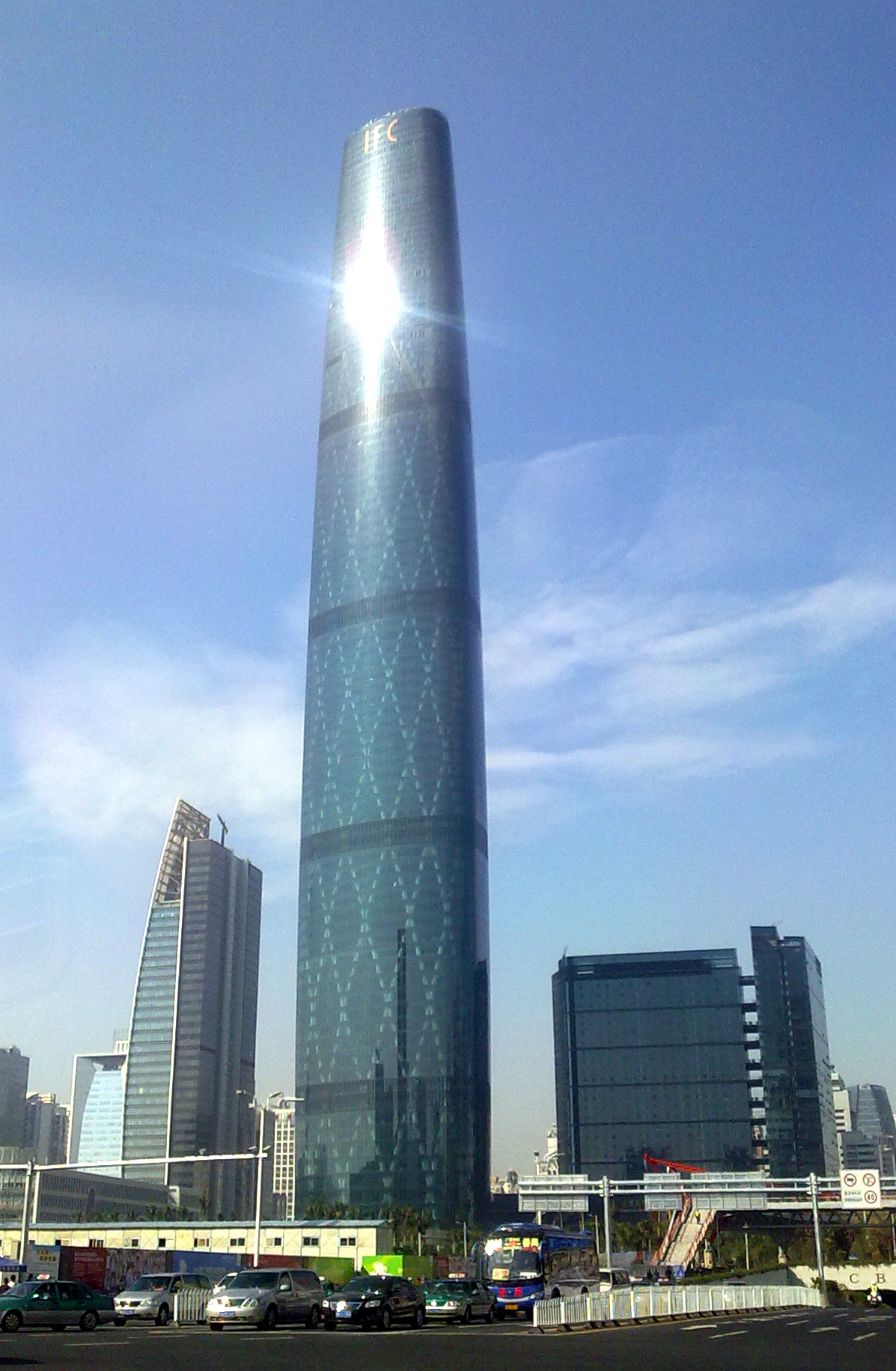
Guangzhou West Tower
