= Yuexiu Hill =

Hill in Yuexiu District, Guangzhou, China

Coordinates: 23.1429°N 113.2603°E

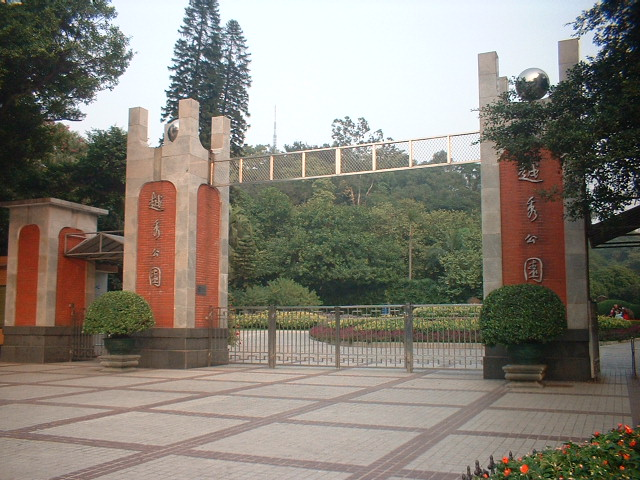
- Chinese: 越秀山 粤秀山
- Literal meaning: Mountain of Southern Display
Transcriptions
Standard Mandarin
- Hanyu Pinyin: Yuèxiùshān
Yue: Cantonese
- Jyutping: Jyut^{6} sau^{3} saan^{1}

Yuewang Hill
- Chinese: 越王山
- Literal meaning: Mountain of the Southern King
Transcriptions
Standard Mandarin
- Hanyu Pinyin: Yuèwángshān
Yue: Cantonese
- Jyutping: Jyut^{6} wong^{4} saan^{1}

Yuexiu Park
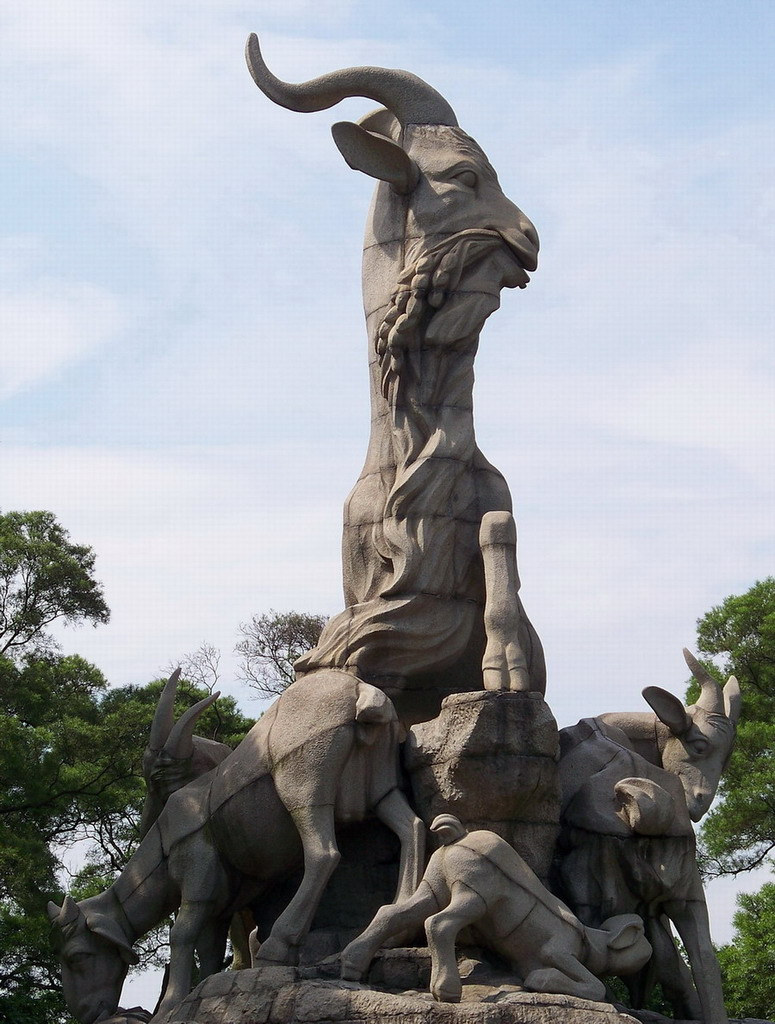
- The Five Rams sculpture
- Traditional Chinese: 越秀公園
- Simplified Chinese: 越秀公园
- Literal meaning: Public Park of Southern Display
Transcriptions
Standard Mandarin
- Hanyu Pinyin: Yuèxiù Gōngyuán
Yue: Cantonese
- Jyutping: Jyut^{6} sau^{3} Gung^{1} jyun^{2}

Yuexiu Hill, also known as Yut Sau Shan, Yut Sau Hill, or Mount Yuexiu, is located in Yuexiu District, Guangzhou. It once formed the northern end of the old walled city, though most of the walls have been dismantled and the city has now expanded far beyond it. Its grounds now form Guangzhou's Yuexiu Park, which remains one of the most famous tourist attractions in Guangzhou, including beautiful natural surroundings and ancient sites. It covers an area of 860,000 square meters (9,300,000 sq ft).

== Name ==
Yuexiu is also known as "Mount Yuexiu", "Yuexiu Mountain", and "Yuexiu Shan" from its Mandarin name. It was formerly known as Mount Yut-Sau or "Yut-Sau-Shan" from its Cantonese pronunciation.

== Popular attractions ==
=== Five Rams Sculpture ===
Guangzhou's Five Rams Sculpture is located atop Yuexiu Hill. It was built in 1960 from more than 130 pieces of granite and is one of the city's emblems.

The sculpture represents the five rams who gave Guangzhou its nickname "City of Rams" and were formerly honored at its Temple of the Five Immortals. These immortals were said to have ridden rams into the city soon after its founding, teaching its residents how to grow rice and ending the specter of famine forever. Locals consider the rams symbols of good luck.

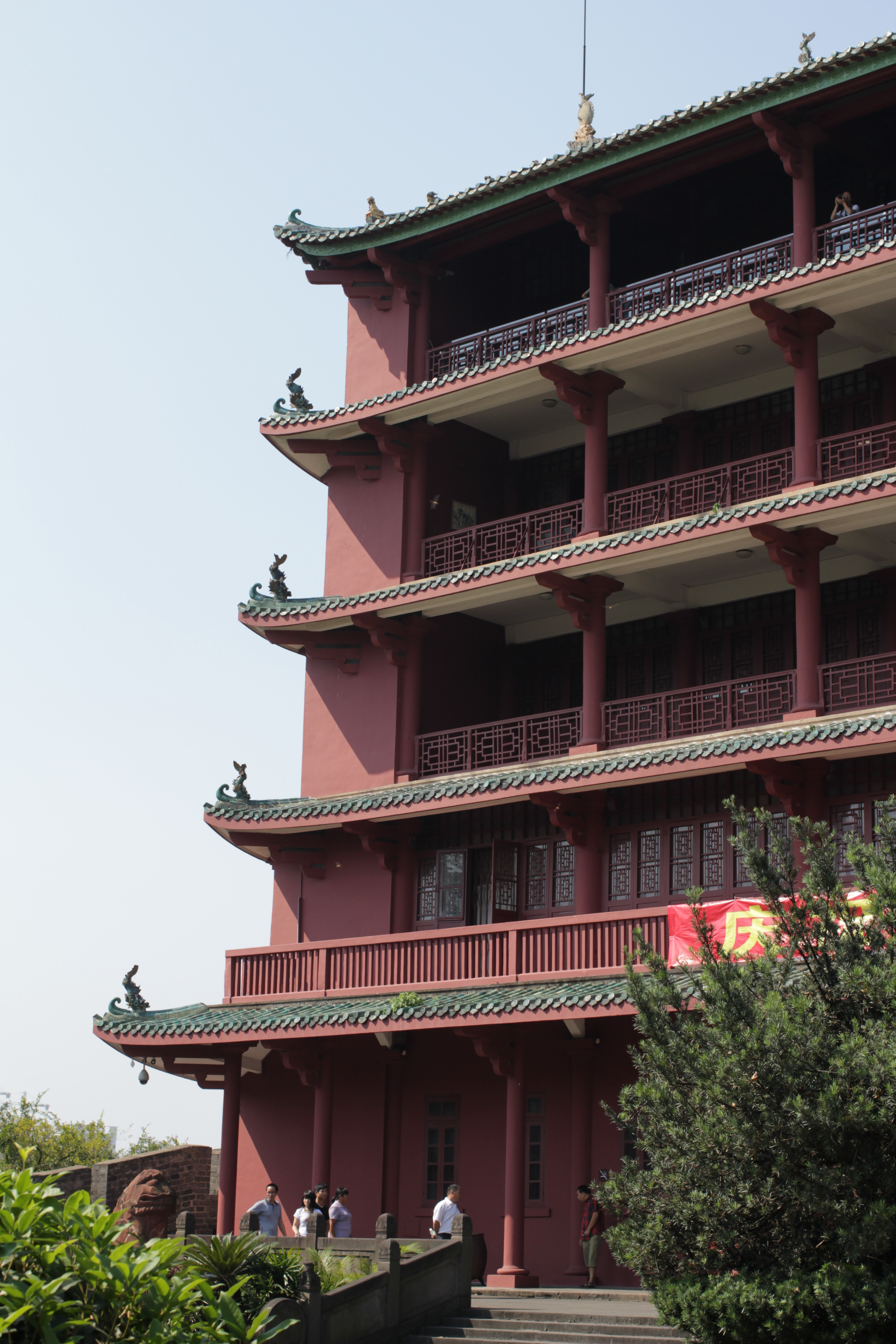
Zhenhai Tower

=== Zhenhai Tower/Chen Hoi Lau ===
Also atop Yuexiu Hill is the Five-storied Pagoda now known as Chen Hoi Lau. The present structure is 28 meters (92 ft) high and 16 meters (52 ft) wide. It has housed the Guangzhou Museum since it was opened to the public in 1928.

A guard tower was first erected at the site in 1380, one of the first to be constructed in Lingnan. Chinese legend holds that Zhu Liangzu (朱亮祖), Marquis of Yongjia and a member of the Ming dynasty, saw yellow and purple air rising over Yuexiu and was told that it was the sign of a new emperor. He then erected the tower as part of the city walls to alter the mountain's feng shui and prevent the prophecy from coming to pass. It has been destroyed and rebuilt five times, the various towers appearing in Chinese poetry and art.

=== Yuexiu Stadium/Yut Sau Shan Stadium ===
Yuexiu Stadium was refreshed from the old Yut Sau Shan Park Playground at the foot of the hill in 1950 at the behest of Mayor Ye Jianying. It covers an area of 43,000 square meters (462,848 sq ft). It was one of the Asian Games venues in 2010.

The stadium is not only a sports activity site, but also a large-scale concert hall. Since its opening in October 1950, it has held 200 meetings and more than 280 performances. It can hold 35,000 people.

=== Pavilion of Regaining ===
The Pavilion of Regaining is a square pavilion erected in 1948 on the spot of an earlier 1928 memorial to the Xinhai Revolution against the Qing Empire. The first pavilion was destroyed amid fighting with the Japanese during World War II.
