= Temple of the Five Immortals (Guangzhou) =

Former Taoist temple

Coordinates: 23.1231°N 113.2546°E

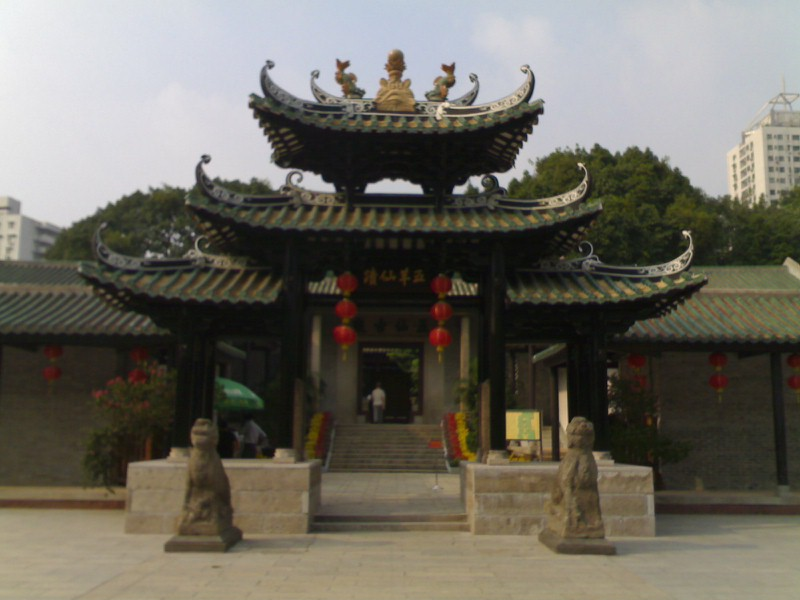
- Entrance gate
- Traditional Chinese: 五仙觀
- Simplified Chinese: 五仙观
- Literal meaning: 5 Immortals Abbey
Transcriptions
Standard Mandarin
- Hanyu Pinyin: Wǔxiān Guàn
- Wade–Giles: Wu-hsien Kuan
Yue: Cantonese
- Jyutping: Ng5 Sin1 Gun3

Grotto of the 5 Immortals
- Chinese: 五仙霞洞
Transcriptions
Standard Mandarin
- Hanyu Pinyin: Wǔxiān Xiadong
- Wade–Giles: Wu-hsien Hsia-tung
Yue: Cantonese
- Jyutping: Ng5 Sin1 Haa4 Dung6

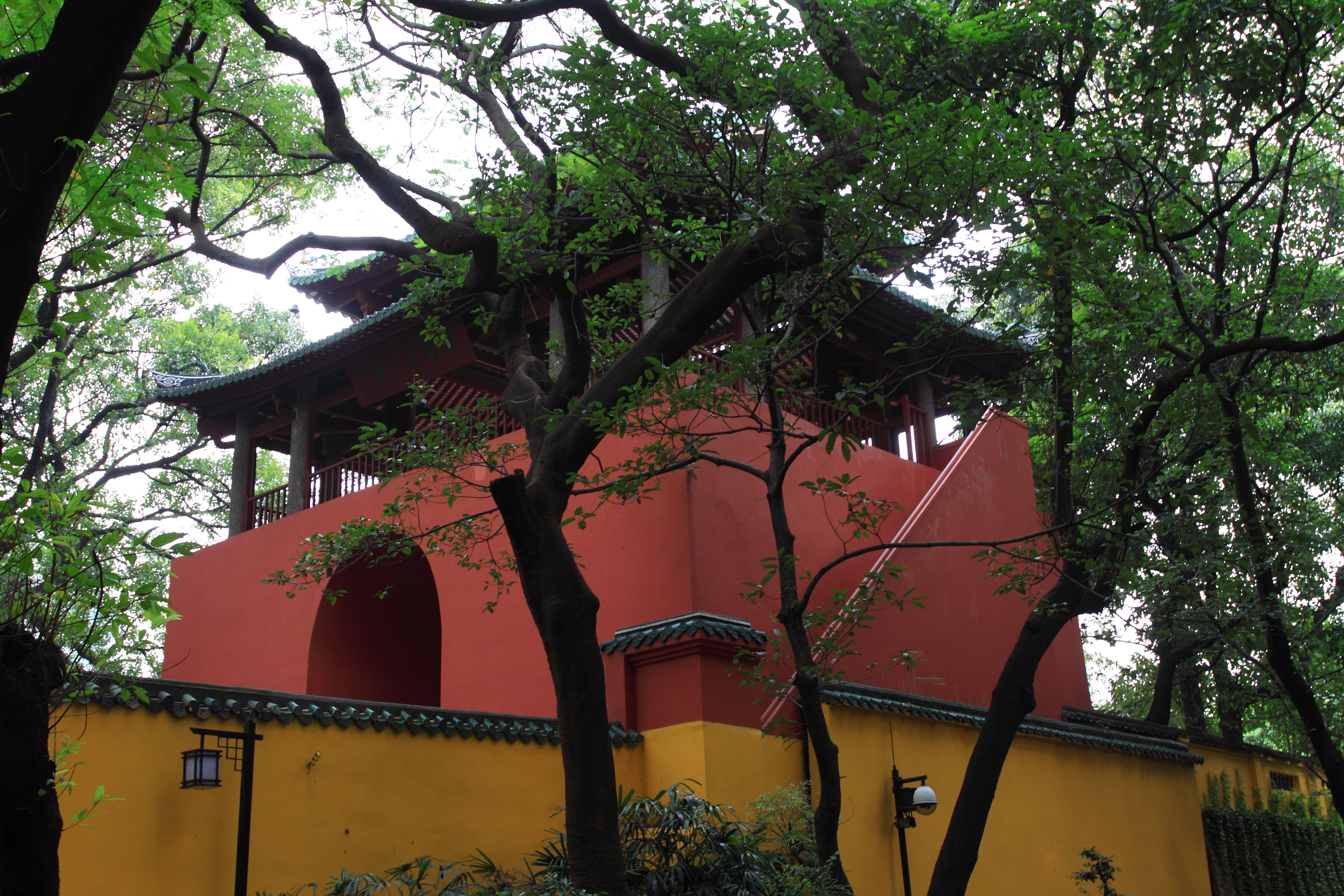
The temple's bell tower

The Temple of the Five Immortals, formerly incorrectly translated as the Temple of the Five Genii, is a former Taoist temple in Guangzhou, Guangdong, in China. It lies beside the junction of West Huifu Road and Liurong Rd.

== Legend ==
The five immortals honored by the temple are first attested in a passage of the 983 Taiping Imperial Readings (太平御覽) explaining Guangzhou's nickname "City of the Rams". One of the etiological myths given is that

At one time, Sun Hao made Teng Xiu a governor but, before reaching his prefecture, there were five immortals riding five colored sheep and bearing the five grains who came upon him and, after he received them, they left. Now the prefectural hall's beams bear the five immortals riding five colored sheep for good luck. (Note: Chinese: 吴孫皓時以滕脩為剌史，未至州，有五仙人騎五色羊負五榖來，迎而去。今州廳事梁上畫五仙人騎五色羊為瑞。) (Note: The Taiping Imperial Readings, citing an earlier but unnamed "account of prefectures and states".)

The other story, credited to the Records of Canton (廣州記) of Pei Yuan (裴淵), includes the rams and grain but omits the immortals and places the story in Chu during the ministry of Gao Gu.

Later accounts of the immortals' local cult made them culture heroes who introduced rice farming to Guangzhou around the time of its founding, which occurred historically by the Qin army under Zhao Tuo in 214 BC. The immortals' clothes and the sheep were now both said to be in difference colors, connecting them with the Five Chinese Elements. The immortals continued to be worshipped as protectors of the yearly harvest. The five goats they rode to the area were said to have turned to stone when they left, forming the statues which gave Guangzhou its nickname "Goat City" or "City of the Five Rams".

== History ==
An abbey and shrine to the five immortals is first attested during the early Song (c. 11th century), with rulers making sacrifices and locals offering prayer to them. The present temple was erected under the Ming in the 10th year of the Hongwu Era, either AD 1377 or 1378. Under the Qing, the site was also known as the Grotto of the Five Immortals.

Shortly after the installation of the temple's 3-meter (10 ft) high, 5-ton bell in 1378, there was an outbreak of plague in the city. Considered unlucky ever afterward, the "Forbidden Bell" has not been rung since. In the 19th century, the guardian lions at the entrance to the temple were venerated by local women seeking to give birth to sons.

The original temple on Great Market Street burnt down in 1368. It was moved rebuilt in 1377, with its main hall devoted to the five immortals.

By 1923, the temple grounds covered 4,600 m^{2} (50,000 sq ft); that year, Sun Yat-sen ordered seven local temples include it to be auctioned to raise revenue for their war effort against the Beiyang government. It was purchased by a local club, who deposed the residing Taoist clergymen, but its site was given special protection by the municipal government and was eventually converted into a school. Following the opening up of China in the 1980s, the temple was renovated but no longer operates as a Taoist temple.

The Gods of Peace in Canton

== Grounds ==
The huge bell tower dates to the Ming and the main hall before it is still done in the Ming style. The guardian lions at the entrance are centuries old and there are stylized Ming-era sculptures in back as well. A pond to the east of the hall includes a very large foot-shaped depression in red sandstone said to be the mark of one of the temple's immortals. (Note: Those favoring a natural explanation note that the temple's site had been close to the Pearl River before it changed course during the Jin dynasty.) The present statues depict the immortals as three men and two women, all astride their goats.

A back room holds a large 1907 map of Guangzhou, showing interesting details of the imperial city and illuminating that most of the city was, at that time, still rural.

== See also ==
- Agriculture in Chinese mythology & Hou Ji
- The Statue of the Five Rams on Yuexiu Hill
- The Temple of the Five Immortals in Shiyan
