= Zhenhai Tower (Guangzhou) =

Building in Guangzhou, China

Coordinates: 23°8′26.37″N 113°15′37.67″E

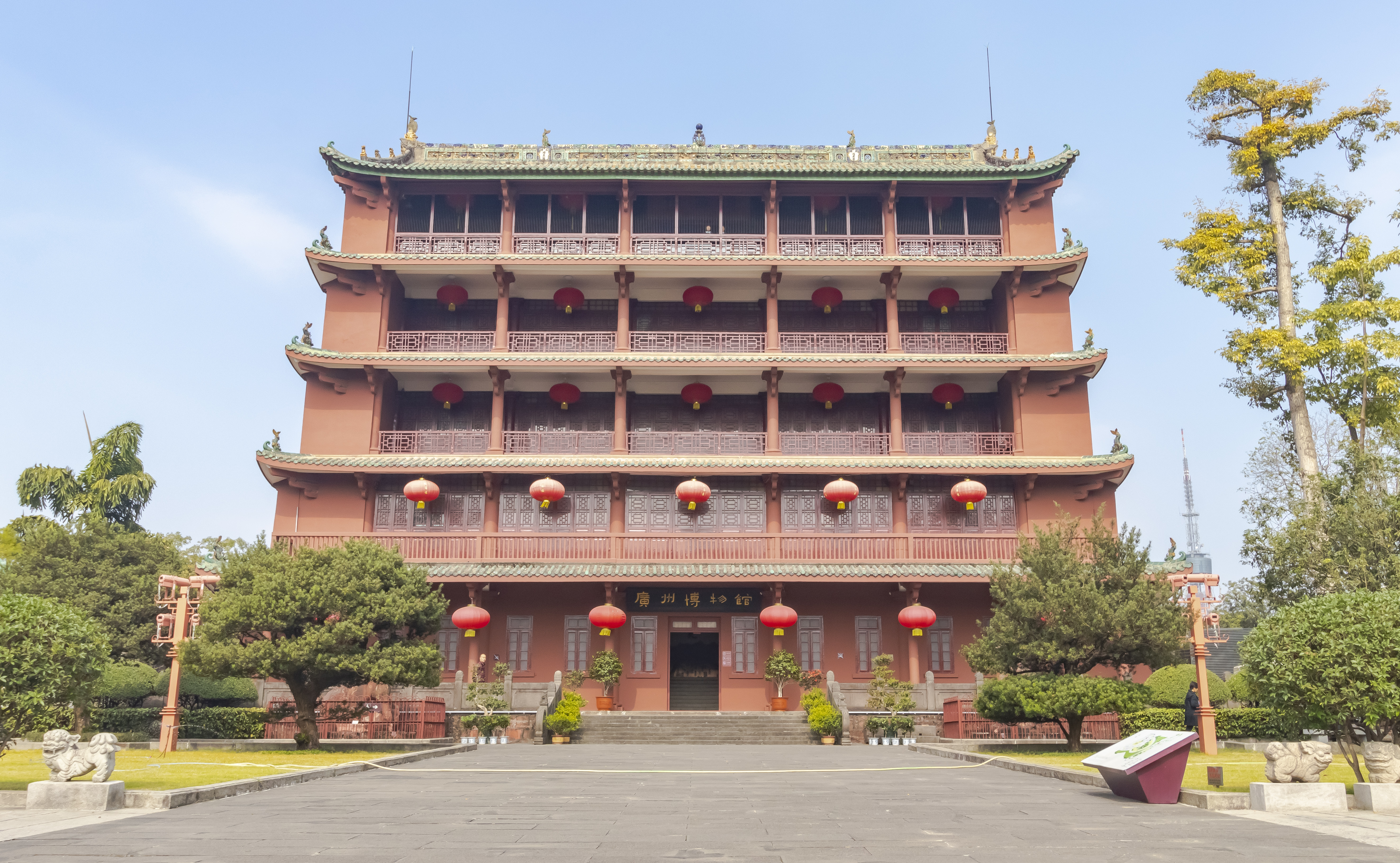
- Simplified Chinese: 镇海楼
- Traditional Chinese: 鎭海樓
- Literal meaning: Sea-Guardian Building
Transcriptions
Standard Mandarin
- Hanyu Pinyin: Zhènhǎi Lóu
Yue: Cantonese
- Jyutping: zan3 hoi2 lau4

Five-Story Pagoda
- Simplified Chinese: 五层楼
- Traditional Chinese: 五層樓
- Literal meaning: Five-Story Building
Transcriptions
Standard Mandarin
- Hanyu Pinyin: Wǔcéng Lóu
Yue: Cantonese
- Jyutping: ng5 cang4 lau4

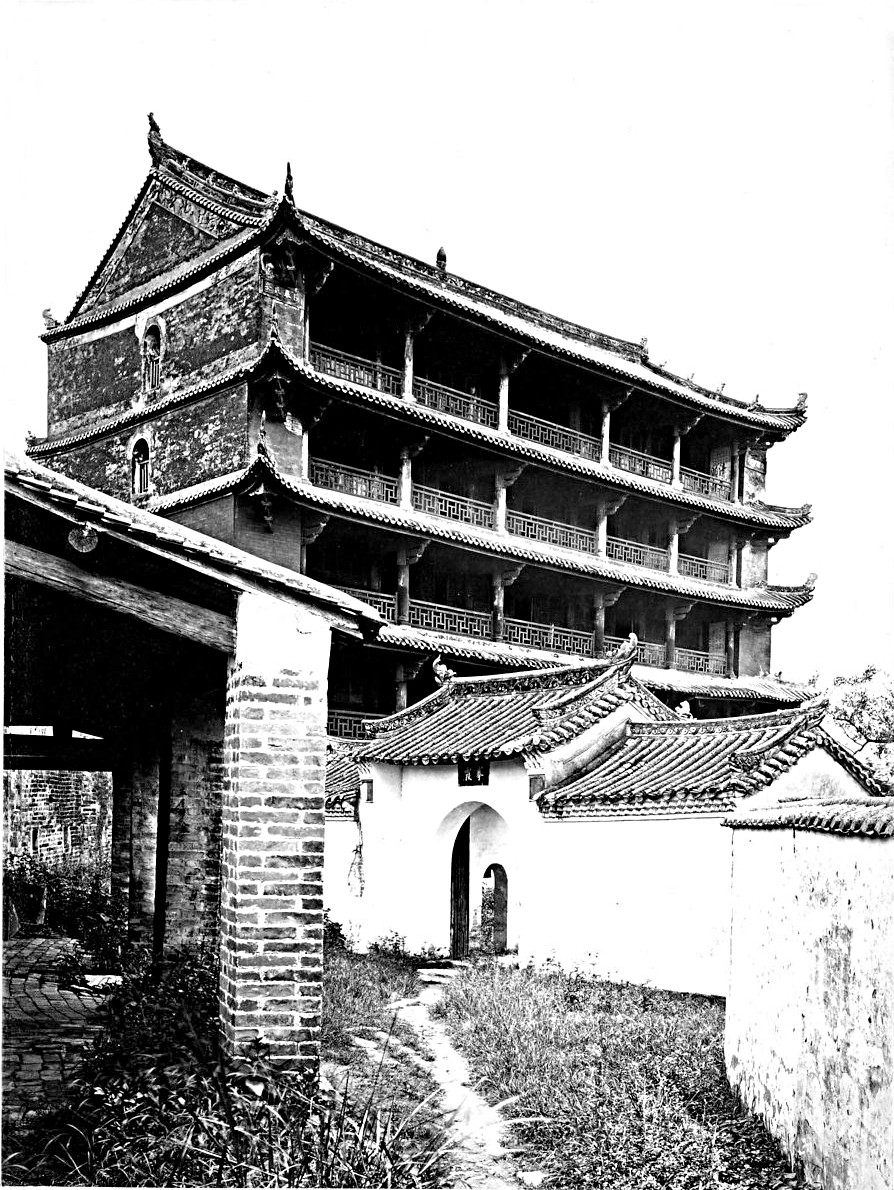
The Five-Story Pagoda in the 1890s

The Zhenhai Tower, also known as the Five-Story Pagoda, is a tower in Guangzhou, Guangdong. It is located in Yuexiu Park, in central Guangzhou. It now houses the Guangzhou Museum.

== History ==
It was first built in 1380, at the beginning of the Ming dynasty, by the Yongjia Marquis Zhu Liangzu (朱亮祖). The tower is 92 feet (28 meters) in height, 102 feet (31 meters) in width and 52 feet (16 meters) in depth.

== Popular culture ==
By the time it was the highest building of Guangzhou when it was constructed. For a long period of time, it was the symbol of Guangzhou before the Five Goats Statue was built.

== Gallery ==
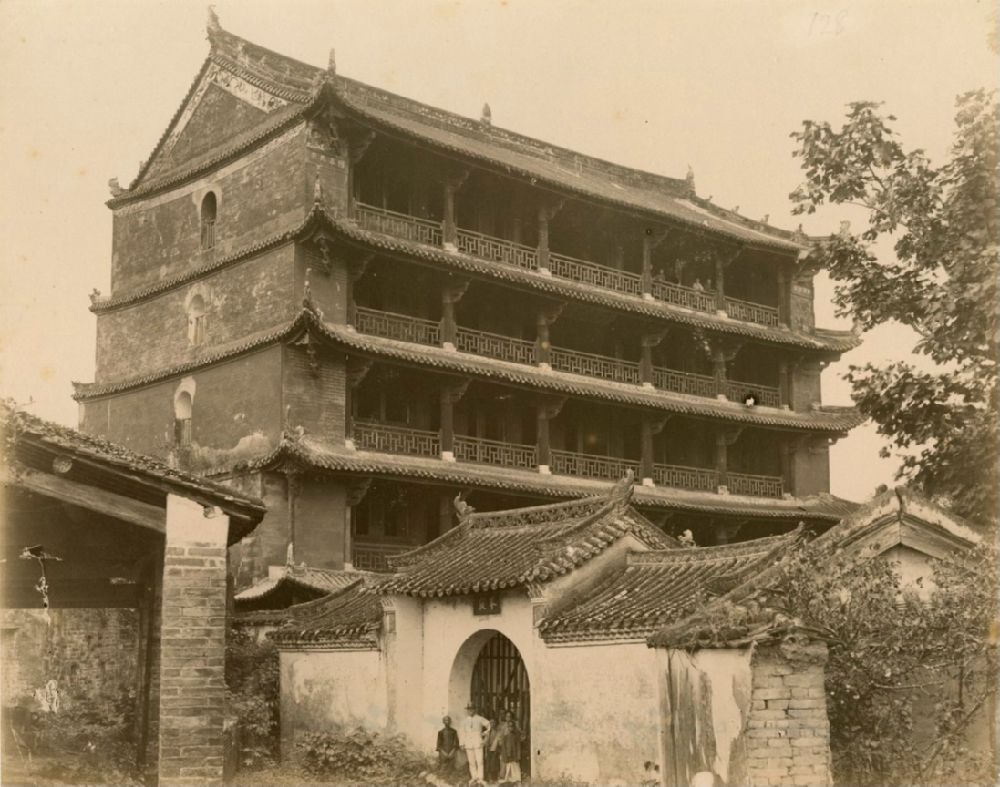
Photographer unknown, "Zhenhai Tower, Guangzhou," n.d., Department of Image Collections, National Gallery of Art Library, Washington, DC

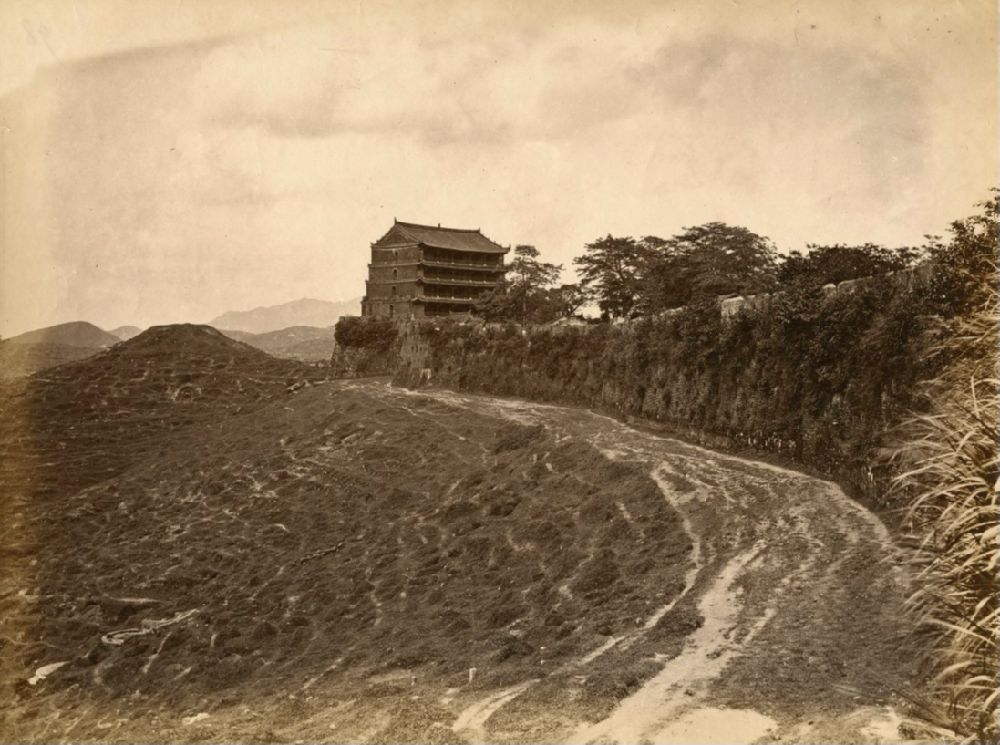
Photographer unknown, "Zhenhai Tower, Guangzhou," n.d., Department of Image Collections, National Gallery of Art Library, Washington, DC

== See also ==
- Yuexiu Hill
