= Huacheng Square =

Square in Guangzhou, China

Coordinates: 23°7′34.4″N 113°19′9.3″E

- Simplified Chinese: 花城广场
- Traditional Chinese: 花城廣場
Transcriptions
Standard Mandarin
- Hanyu Pinyin: Huāchéng Guǎngchǎng
Yue: Cantonese
- Jyutping: faa^{1}sing^{4} gwong^{2}coeng^{4}

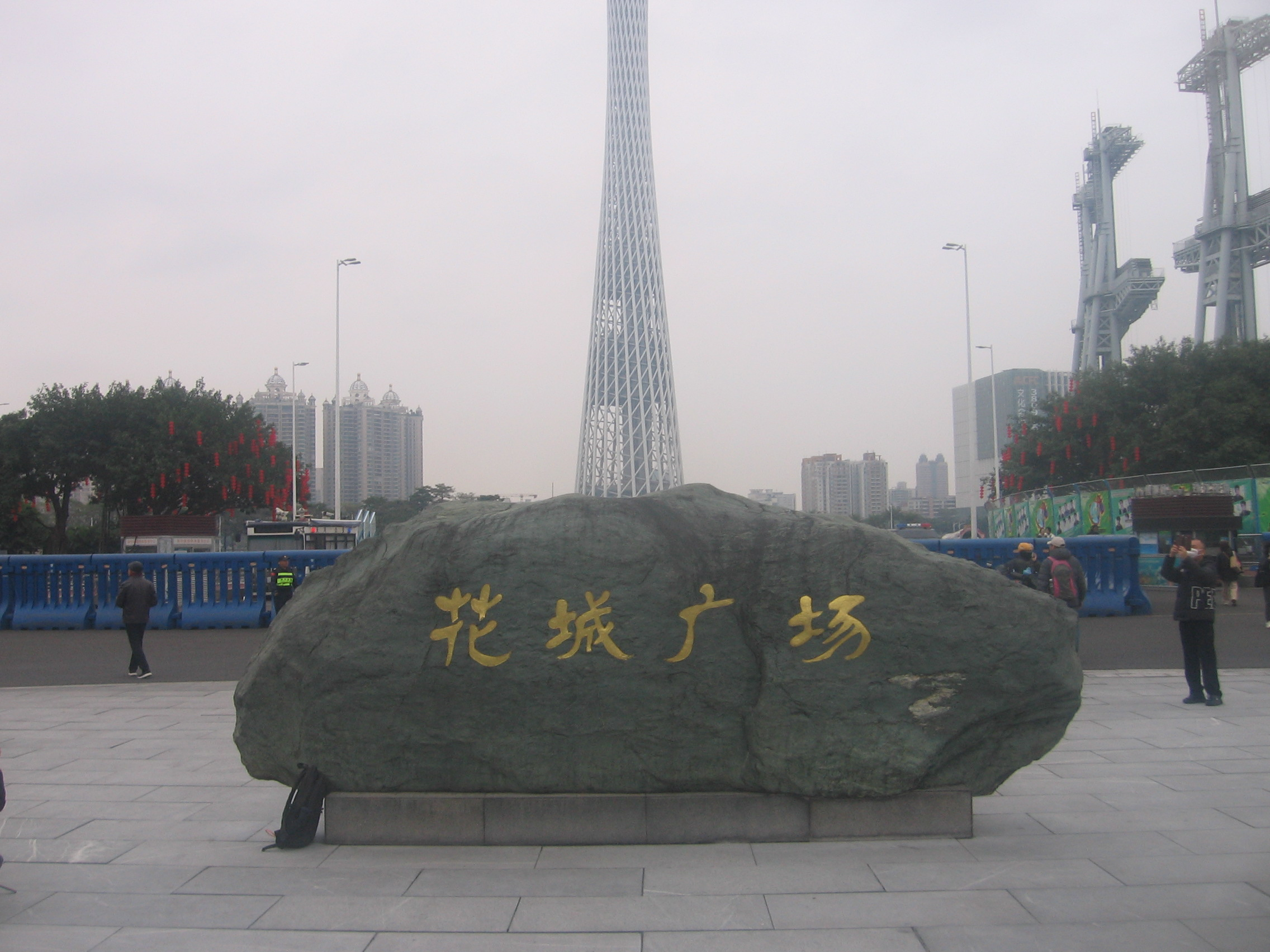
Huacheng Square

Huacheng Square, or Flower City Square (Chinese: 花城广场), is the largest city square in the city of Guangzhou. The square is situated on the city axis in Zhujiang New Town, covering an area of 56 hectares with Haixinsha Island to its south and Huangpu Avenue to its north. Guangzhou Opera House, Guangdong Museum and Guangzhou Library are also located around the square.

Underneath the whole area are the Guangzhou APM line with its 4 stations, as well as the Mall of the World shopping center with many connecting tunnels to the other malls, BRT bus stations and metro stations.

On the surface, it is car and bike free pedestrian area with parks, ponds and fountain, making it a popular destination area for locals and tourists. Especially in the evening, the view of the Canton Tower and the other buildings in the Zhujiang New Town CBD with all the lights decoration is remarkable.

== History ==
The square was opened to public in October 2010, before the opening of the 2010 Asian Games. The square is also a major exhibiting site for the Guangzhou International Light Festival that is held every November since 2011, which in 2015, UNESCO selected the Guangzhou International Light Festival as one of the major cultural events.

In May 2024, it was selected for the first batch of Guangzhou’s permanent protected green space list.
