= Timeline of Guangzhou =

Listing of notable events in Guangzhou's history

The following is a timeline of the history of the Chinese city of Guangzhou, also formerly known as Panyu, Canton, and Kwang-chow.

== Nanyue ==
- 214 BCE – Panyu established as a Qin base during Zhao Tuo's first failed invasion of the southern lands of the Baiyue
- 204 BCE – Panyu becomes the capital of Zhao Tuo's kingdom of Nanyue.

== Imperial China ==
- 111 BCE – Panyu becomes a provincial capital of the Han dynasty after the Han–Nanyue War as the Han expands southward.
- 226 CE – Panyu becomes the seat of Guang Prefecture ("Guangzhou").
- 401 – Guangxiao Temple first established as the "Baoen Guangziao" Temple.
- 537 – Temple of the Six Banyan Trees built.
- 878–879 — Guangzhou massacre instigated by forces loyal to Huang Chao
- 1350 – Huaisheng Mosque rebuilt.
- 1380 – Zhenhai Tower built.
- 1516 – Portuguese merchants arrive.

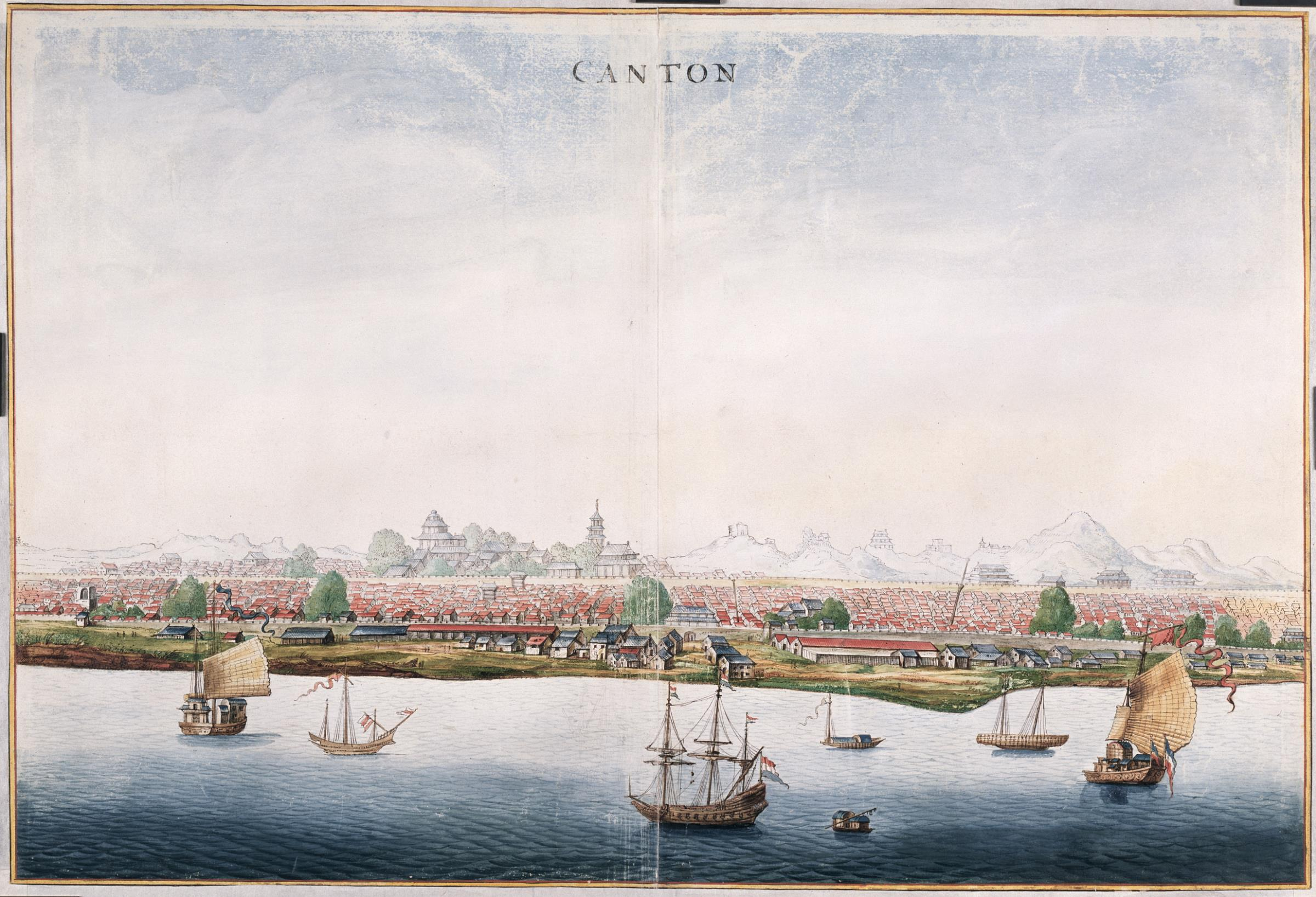
View of Canton with merchant ship of the Dutch East India Company, c. 1665

- 1600 – Pazhou Pagoda built.
- 1619 – Chigang Pagoda built.
- 1684 – British East India Company in business.

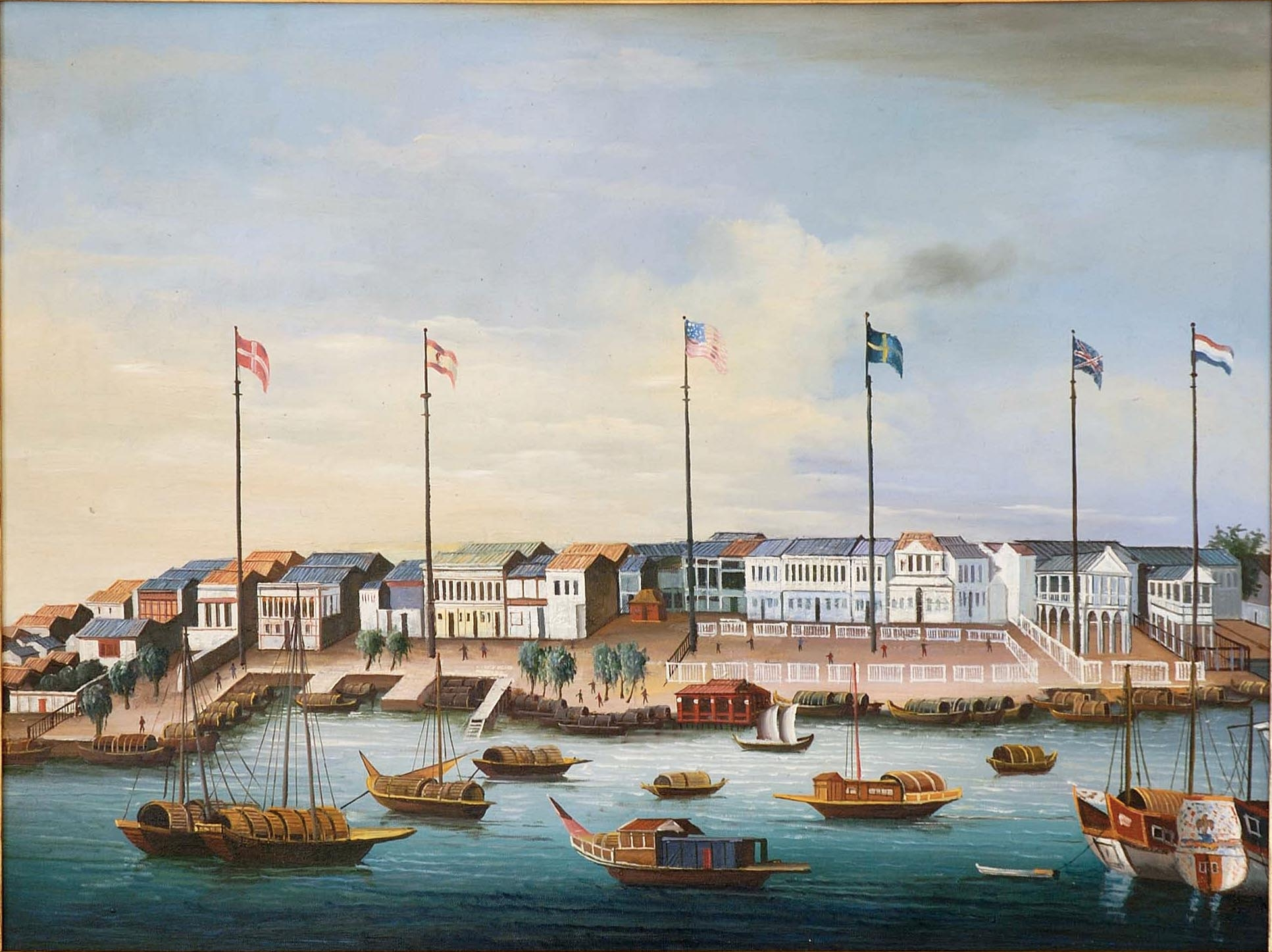
Painting of the Thirteen Factories c. 1820, with flags of Denmark, Spain, the U.S., Sweden, Britain, and the Netherlands

- 1821 – Xigutang literary society formed.
- 1822 – Fire.
- 1827 – The Canton Register, an English-language newspaper, begins publication.
- 1832 – Jardine, Matheson and Co. in business.
- 1834 – Wetmore & Co. in business.
- 1835 – The Canton Press, an English-language newspaper, begins publication.
- 1840 – Augustine Heard and Company in business.
- 1841
  - February 27: Battle of First Bar.
  - March 2: Battle of Whampoa.
  - March 18: Battle of Canton
  - May: Second Battle of Canton.
- 1842 – City designated a treaty port under the Treaty of Nanking.
- 1848 – Apostolic Vicariate of Guangdong-Guangxi established.
- 1856
  - British/French occupation begins.
  - Thirteen Factories set on fire.
- 1859 – Shameen Island divided into French and British concessions.
- 1861 – British/French occupation ends.
- 1863 – Sacred Heart Cathedral built.
- 1866 – Yu Yin Shan Fang garden laid out.
- 1879
  - City area: 6.5 square kilometers (approximate).
  - Population: 400,000 (estimate).
- 1894
  - Plague (3rd Pandemic).
  - Chen Clan Academy built.
- 1895 – First Guangzhou uprising
- 1908 – Guangzhou North Railway Station opens.
- 1911
  - Kowloon–Canton Railway begins operating.
  - Second Guangzhou Uprising

== Republic of China ==
- The Shakee Massacre on June 23, 1925, resulted in over two hundred casualties due to gunfire by British, French and Portuguese forces in Shaji (called Shake in Cantonese)
- 1918 – Urban council established.
- 1923
  - June: National Congress of the Chinese Communist Party held in Guangzhou.
  - Kuomintang in power.
- 1924
  - Peasant Movement Training Institute and Whampoa Military Academy open.
  - Canton Merchant Volunteers Corps Uprising.
  - National Kwangtung University established.
- 1927 – December 11–13: Communist uprising.
- 1931 – Sun Yat-sen Memorial Hall built.
- 1932
  - Guangzhou Baiyun Airport opens in Baiyun District.
  - Guangzhou Conservatory of Music founded.
- 1933 – Haizhu Bridge constructed.
- 1936
  - Canton–Hankou Railway begins operating.
  - Population: 1,122,600 (estimate).
- 1938 – October 21: Japanese occupation begins.
- 1945 – September 16: Japanese occupation ends.
- 1949
  - Nationalist government under the acting president Li Zongren relocates to Guangzhou.
  - Nanfang Daily newspaper begins publication.

== People's Republic of China ==
- 1949
  - October: Communist forces enter city.
  - Radio Guangdong begins broadcasting.
- 1952 – Guangzhou Daily newspaper begins publication.
- 1954
  - Guangzhou Evergrande Football Club formed.
  - South China Institute of Botany active.
- 1956 – Guangzhou University of Chinese Medicine founded.
- 1957
  - Beijing–Guangzhou Railway in operation.
  - Canton Fair begins.
  - Guangzhou Symphony Orchestra founded.
  - Population: 1,840,000.
- 1958
  - Guangzhou Academy of Fine Arts in operation.
  - Jinan University relocates to Guangzhou.
- 1959 – Guangdong Provincial Museum founded.
- 1964 – Population: 3,031,486.
- 1967 – Renmin Bridge built.
- 1981 - Sister city relationship established with Los Angeles, USA.
- 1982
  - Guangzhou Library and Liyuan Poetry Society established.
  - Population: 3,181,510 city; 5,669,640 urban agglomeration.
- 1983 – Mausoleum of the Nanyue King discovered.
- 1984
  - Guangzhou Economic and Technological Development Zone established.
  - City designated sub-provincial city administrative status.
  - Southern Weekly newspaper begins publication.
- 1985
  - Zhujiang Brewery begins operation.
  - Guangzhou Bridge built.
- 1988
  - Haiyin Bridge built.
  - Museum of the Mausoleum of the Nanyue King opens.
- 1990
  - Guangdong International Building constructed.
  - Avon begins hiring ladies in Guangzhou.
  - Population: 6,299,943.
- 1991
  - Guangzhou TV Tower erected.
  - November: 1991 FIFA Women's World Cup held.
- 1992 – Guangzhou Free Trade Zone established.
- 1996 – Guangzhou East railway station opens.
- 1997
  - Guangzhou Metro begins operating.
  - CITIC Plaza and Humen Pearl River Bridge built.
  - Southern Metropolis Daily begins publication.
  - Xiangjiang Safari Park opens.
- 1998 – Hedong Bridge, Jiangwan Bridge, Jiefang Bridge, and Huanan Bridge open.
- 2000 – Yajisha Bridge opens.
- 2001
  - Guangdong Olympic Stadium opens.
  - November: Chinese National Games held in Guangzhou.
- 2002
  - Vitamin Creative Space founded.
  - Population: 10,106,229.
- 2003
  - Zhang Guangning becomes mayor.
  - Pazhou Bridge opens.
- 2004
  - Guangzhou Baiyun International Airport opens in Huadu District.
  - Guangzhou Higher Education Mega Center built.
  - Guangzhou International Women's Open tennis tournament begins.
- 2006 – Chime-Long Paradise amusement park in business.
- 2008 – Huangpu Bridge and Xinguang Bridge open.
- 2009 – Liede Bridge opens.
- 2010
  - Canton Tower and Guangzhou International Finance Center built.
  - November: 2010 Asian Games held.
  - Guangzhou Opera House, Guangdong Museum, and Guangzhou South Railway Station open.
  - Wan Qingliang becomes mayor.
  - Guangzhou Television Cantonese controversy.
  - Guangzhou Bus Rapid Transit system launched.
- 2011
  - Guangzhou–Zhuhai Intercity Railway begins operating.
  - Pearl River Tower built.
  - Chen Jianhua becomes mayor.
- 2012 – Leatop Plaza and The Pinnacle built.
- 2013 – Air pollution in Guangzhou reaches annual mean of 48 PM2.5 and 72 PM10, more than recommended.
- 2021 – 2021 Guangzhou bombing.

== See also ==
- Guangzhou history
- List of administrative divisions of Guangzhou
- Mayor of Guangzhou
- List of newspapers in Guangdong
- List of universities and colleges in Guangzhou
- List of historic buildings in Guangzhou
- List of tallest buildings in Guangzhou (sortable by date)
- Eight Sights of Guangzhou
- Major National Historical and Cultural Sites (Guangdong) in Guangzhou
- Southward expansion of the Han dynasty
- Other names of Guangzhou
- Urbanization in China
