= List of bridges in Guangdong =

This is a list of bridges in Guangdong, China.

== List ==
The Huangpu Bridge over the Pearl River in Guangzhou

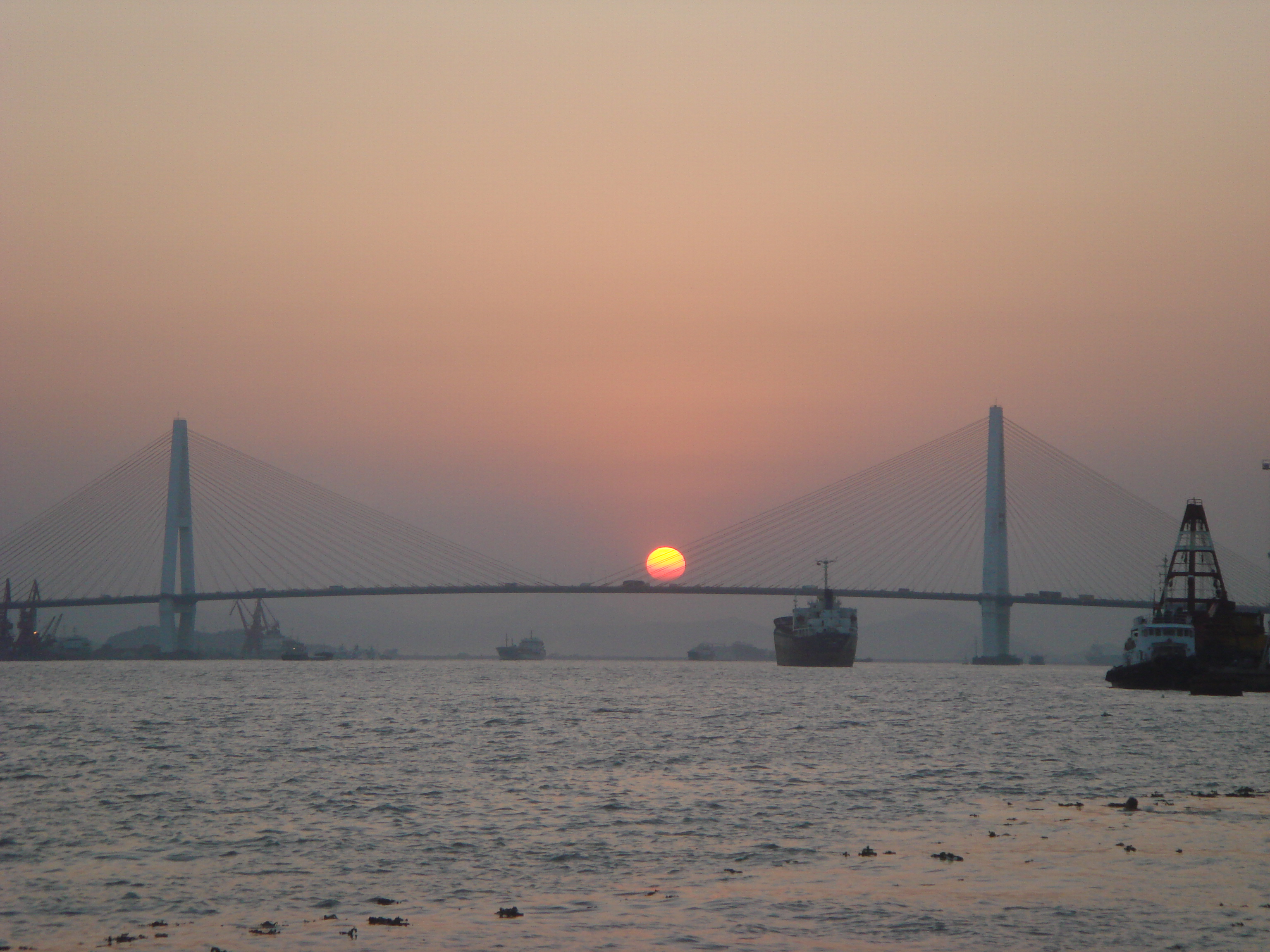
The Queshi Bridge in Shantou

- Chancheng Dongping Bridge
- Dongguan Shuidao
- Dongpingshuidao Bridge
- Guangzhou Bridge
- Haiyin Bridge
- Haizhu Bridge
- Hedong Bridge
- Huanan Bridge
- Huangpu Bridge
- Humen Pearl River Bridge
- Jiangwan Bridge
- Jiefang Bridge
- Jinma Bridge
- Liede Bridge
- Nanhai Sanshanxi Bridge
- Panyu Bridge
- Pazhou Bridge
- Pingsheng Bridge
- Qi'ao Bridge
- Queshi Bridge
- Renmin Bridge
- Shantou Bay Bridge
- Xilong Bridge
- Xinguang Bridge
- Yajisha Bridge
- Zhanjiang Bay Bridge
- Zhaoqing Bridge under construction

== See also ==
- List of bridges in China
