= Huanan =

Huanan could refer to:

- South China (华南)
- Huanan County (桦南县), Heilongjiang
- Huanan Bridge (华南大桥), in Guangzhou
- Huanan Seafood Wholesale Market, in Wuhan, suspected source of COVID-19
