= Dongpingshuidao Bridge =

Dongpingshuidao Bridge 东平水道特大桥
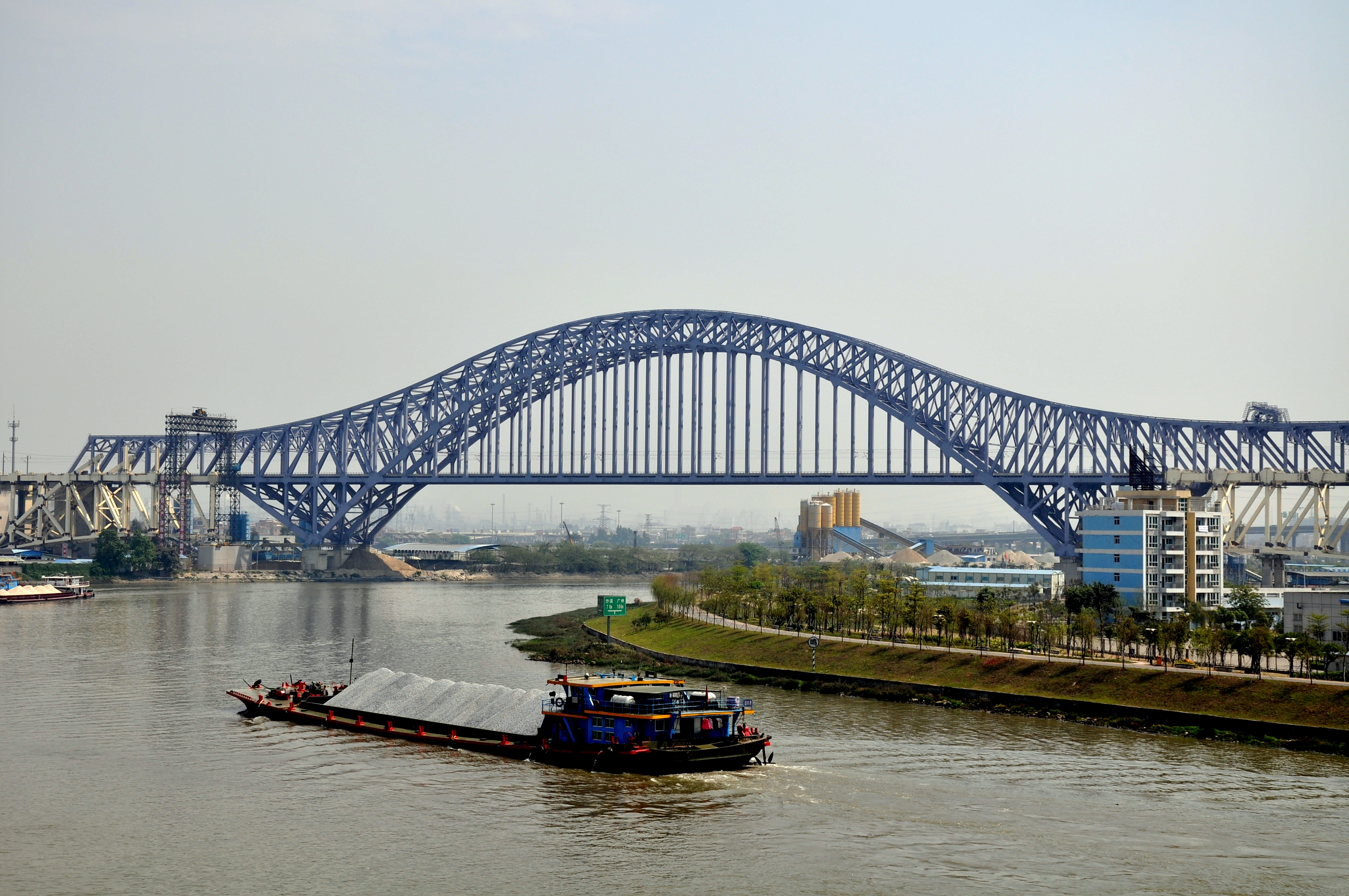
- Coordinates: 23°02′41″N 113°12′55″E
- Carries: Wuhan–Guangzhou High-Speed Railway
- Crosses: Pearl River
- Locale: Foshan, Guangdong, China

Characteristics
- Design: Arch bridge
- Total length: 442 metres (1,450 ft)
- Longest span: 242 metres (794 ft)

History
- Opened: 2009

Location
- Interactive map of Dongpingshuidao Bridge

The Dongpingshuidao Bridge is an arch bridge located in Foshan, Guangdong, China. Opened in 2009, it spans 360 metres (1,180 ft) over the Dongping waterway, an arm of the Pearl River. The bridge carries the Wuhan–Guangzhou High-Speed Railway.

== See also ==
- List of longest arch bridge spans
