= Pearl River Sources =

Source of three Chinese rivers

The Pearl River Sources is the source of three Chinese rivers, including the Pearl River. The Chinese name is Zhujiangyuan, and is located east of Maxiongshan and north of Zhanyi County, Qujing city of Yunnan province. It was named as a national AAAA class tourist spot in 2005. This spot is also a famous national Forest Park, with a total area of 50 square kilometers. The Pearl River Sources has a unique advantage for the tourism industry, as it has abundant scenic resources.

== Rivers ==
Maxiongshan is the origin of the Nanpanjiang, Beipanjiang and Nuilanjiang rivers. The Nanpanjiang River is the Pearl River trunk stream. The Beipanjiang River is the Pearl's tributaries stream. Maxiongshan is also the demarcation line of the Nanpanjiang River, the Beipanjiang River and the NiuLanjiang River (Changjiang River system).

== Wildlife ==
The three rivers area hosts over 95% forest coverage. The area has 73 plant families and 190 species, including varieties of rhododendrons that grow to a height ranging from a few centimeters to thirty meters. Charming fujithion is a variation of tree species in Yunnan, less than one meter high that has become a great visitor attraction. Wild animals include many klipdas, pheasants, squirrels, and muntjacs. This

== Climate ==
The Pearl River Sources, located to the north of the Tropic of Cancer, belongs to the subtropical monsoon climate, where the annual average temperature is 14 °C. The temperature is cool and moderate throughout the year, with good weather conditions.

== Amenities ==
More than 20 natural and cultural scenic spots have been built. However, the landscape remains the only attraction. Tourism's small size there has limited options for restaurants, hotels, shopping and entertainment.

Suggestions for improvement include redesigning the driving route to the source; changing focus from sightseeing to leisure vacation tourism, upgrading amenities and increasing marketing.
