= Shameen Incident =

1925 massacre in Guangzhou, China

- Part of May Thirtieth Movement and Canton–Hong Kong strike
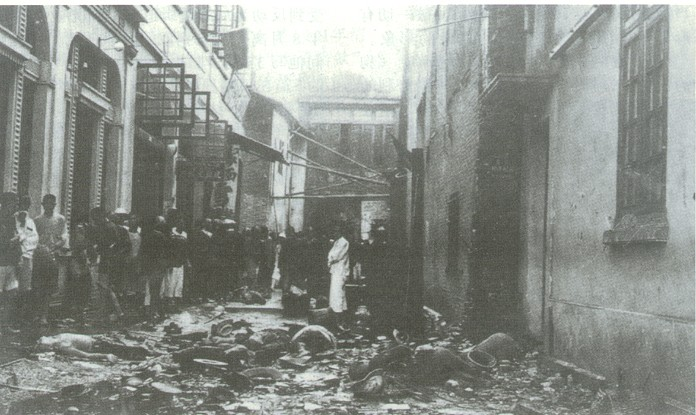
- Photos of Shakee after the conflict
Date	June 23rd, 1925
Location	(Taiwan) Shaji, Guangzhou, Canton City, Republic of China (United Kingdom) British concession on Shameen (France) French concession on Shameen
Result	See the Casualties section

Belligerents
Workers, peasants, merchants, and students (Taiwan) Nationalist Government security forces (Guard Corps) (Taiwan) Cadets from the Whampoa Military Academy (Soviet Union) Comintern (Communist International)	(United Kingdom) British Army (France) French Army

Casualties and losses
32 Whampoa soldiers killed and 39 were injured	One British Navy petty officer injured Several British and French marines injured
- 30 Chinese civilians killed, 27 injured 1 French civilian killed 3 Japanese civilians injured 2 British civilians injured
- Cause: Support for the May Thirtieth Movement, demanding the overthrow of imperialism and the abolition of unequal treaties

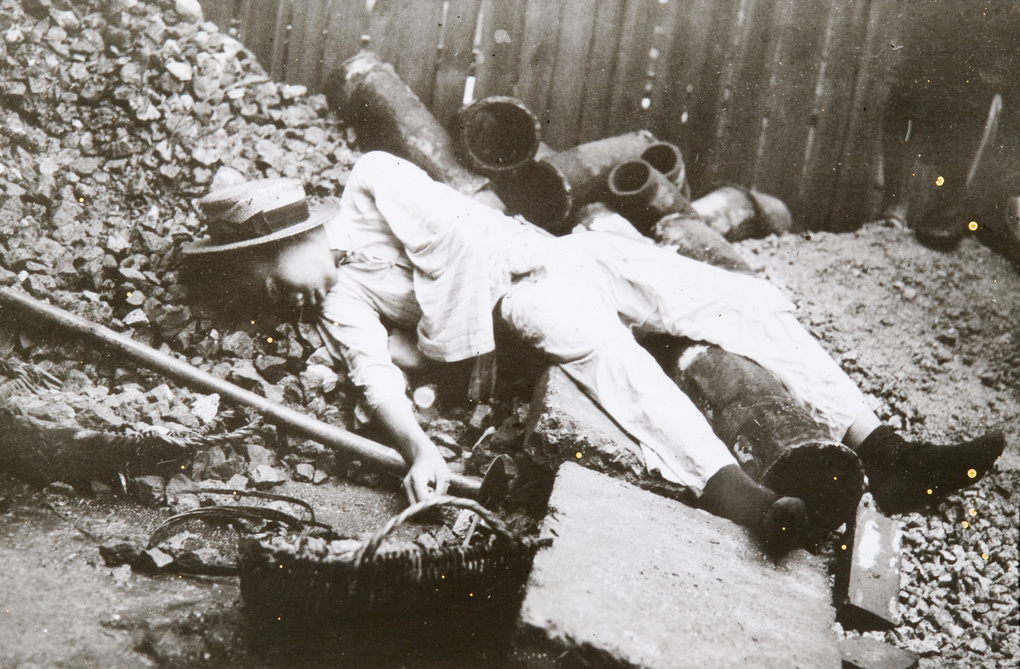
A victim of the massacre

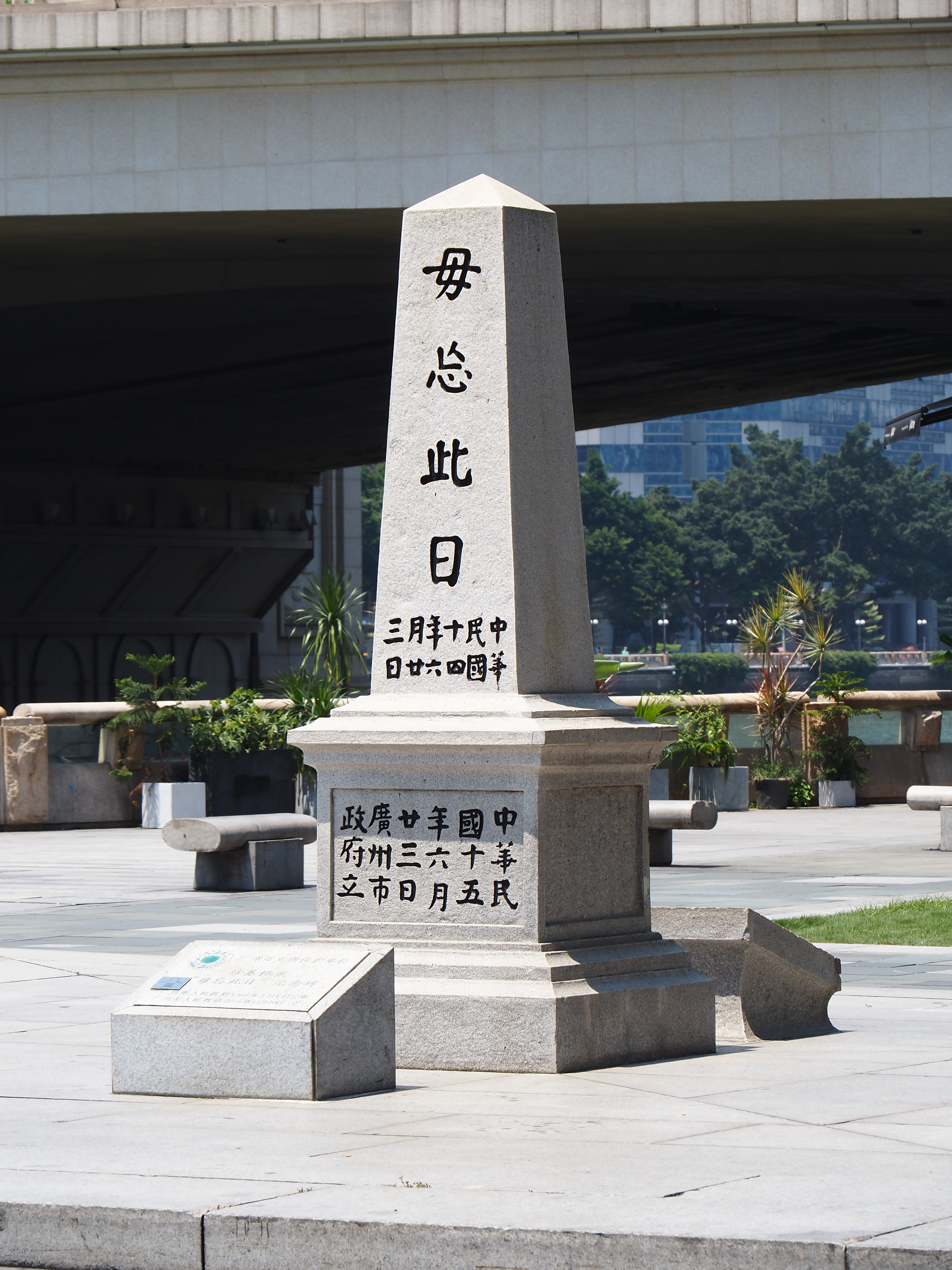
Monument to the Shaji victims of the massacre. Chinese inscription 毋忘此日 translates to "Never forget this day".

The Shameen Incident or the Shameen Attack occurred on June 23, 1925, and is also commonly referred to by the Chinese side as the Shaji Massacre. It was an armed conflict that took place in Canton City. During the incident, British and French soldiers opened fire on a demonstration march along Shaji Road, resulting in severe civilian casualties on the Chinese side. There were significant discrepancies — and even outright contradictions — between the accounts given by the Guangzhou Revolutionary Government and those of the British and French concession authorities regarding the responsibility for and details of the conflict. The incident also triggered corresponding diplomatic disputes.

== Background ==
On June 21, 1925, workers in Hong Kong and Canton went on strike in support of the May Thirtieth Movement in Shanghai. Two days later, on June 23, over 100,000 people convened in Eastern Jiaochang (today, the Guangdong Provincial People's Stadium), announcing their plans to expel the foreign powers, cancel the unequal treaties and walk to the Shakee in protest. At 3 am when the protest had moved to the west bridge, the conflict began. British and French soldiers, perceiving gunshots being fired at them, began to fire on the protesters. In addition, British warships fired on the north coast of Shamian (then spelled Shameen). Over 50 were killed and more than 170 people were seriously injured.

Among the dead there were 20 civilians and 23 cadets and military personnel from Whampoa Military Academy. The death toll included one woman and four minors under 16. One estimate listed the dead at 52.

After the massacre, the national government in Canton (now Guangzhou) appealed to the British and French consulates, requesting a formal apology, punishment of related military officers, the removal of warships, the return of Shamian to the national government and reparations for the families of the dead. The request was rejected by the consulates. On October 29 Hong Kong made a counter strike, in which 130,000 from Hong Kong moved back to Canton.

On July 11, Canton held a public memorial ceremony for the casualties of the massacre. The next year, a memorial and a road were built in memory of Shakee. The road was named 六二三 (Six two three) Road—the numeric date of the event.

== Casualties ==
=== Shakee side ===
According to records handled by the Canton District Prosecutor's Office, the bodies of two Lingnan University students — Qu Lizhou and Xu Yaozhang — were found west of the Shameen West Bridge. At the Shakee entrance, over ten corpses of military officers and Whampoa cadets were found. Between the East and West Bridges, several civilian corpses were also discovered. On-site casualties on the Chinese side, including both military personnel and civilians, amounted to more than 50 people killed instantly during the clash.

By October 3rd, during the state funeral held for the "June 23rd Shakee Martyrs," the number of deceased prepared for burial totaled 61. Among the dead were 31 individuals affiliated with the Whampoa Military Academy, including, according to Chiang Kai-shek's Statement on the Shaji Tragedy, 12 enlisted cadets, 4 officers of the Nationalist Army, and 8 soldiers. The Guangzhou Headquarters Bulletin listed 32 deaths among Nationalist troops and students, while another source cited 27 deaths.

Notable among the dead were:

- Battalion Commander Cao Shiquan of the First Regiment, Third Battalion of the Eastern Expedition Army, a Communist Party member
- Platoon Leaders Yi Mingdao and Chen Gang of the Second Regiment, Second Company
- Recruit Platoon Leader Wen Qidai of the Seventh Company

Zhou Enlai narrowly escaped unharmed.

Due to varied orders issued to different units during the firefight, casualty figures varied. For instance:

- The unit led by Jiang Xiangyun suffered 2 platoon leaders and 3 soldiers killed, with 8 wounded
- Song Xilian's unit reported only 3–4 wounded and no deaths

According to A Tragic Record of Shaji, 29 members of Whampoa and the Nationalist Army died. Civilian casualties included a 13-year-old child, four students, one teacher, nine merchants, and six workers; Cao Yaoyi, a student movement leader from the private Lingnan University, was also wounded. Four of the civilian dead were under 16 years old. More than 170 people were seriously wounded , while the number of minor injuries was uncounted.

Total casualty numbers—civilian and military—remain contested:

- A 1925 report from the Guangdong Provincial Federation of Trade Unions claimed 52 deaths
- Guangzhou Republican Daily reported 47 deaths
- Post-1950s Chinese Communist Party histories and local gazetteers generally adopted the figure of 52 dead and 117 injured

In 2020, Party historian Guo Xin-ye, in his article A Reexamination of Casualty Numbers in the Shaji Massacre, cross-referenced records from several hospitals, the Red Cross, and the Guangdong Provincial Institute of Medical Examination. He concluded the actual death toll was 45, with 38 identities confirmed, and suggested the figure of 52 may have included those who died later of injuries or reflected duplicate counts.

==== Controversy Over the Use of Dumdum Bullets ====
Eyewitnesses at the time recalled that many of the Chinese wounded and dead had massive injuries that were difficult to treat: "some had small entry wounds but large exit wounds, while others had both entry and exit wounds measuring several centimeters wide — some even exceeding a foot" in diameter.

According to testimony from Dr. Guo, a medical officer at the Whampoa Military Academy, he believed that British and French forces had used dumdum bullets, which had already been banned by international law at the time.

The British side denied this claim, stating that dumdum bullets had long been out of production and that soft-nosed rounds were unsuitable for use in machine guns. The British cited testimony from Dr. J.D. Thomson, a surgeon at a Guangzhou hospital, who reported that “most wounds were located on the front or sides of the body, and some clearly resulted from ricocheting or low-velocity bullets.” He found no definitive evidence of dumdum bullets. The British further argued that the distance between Shameen and Shakee was less than 60 yards, and that large wounds could have been caused by the gyroscopic behavior of bullets or by shrapnel from bullets striking stone walls, rather than by banned ammunition.

=== Shameen side ===
On the Shameen side, a French silk merchant named J. Pasquier was killed during the crossfire after being struck in the head by machine gun fire from Whampoa troops. He was reportedly hit by more than eight bullets. Pasquier, originally from Lyon, was between 50 and 60 years old at the time of his death and had lived in Canton City for about 20 years. His business extended across both Canton and Hong Kong. According to eyewitnesses, he had been observing the Shakee parade when he was shot.

Records from the British and French sides state that he was "almost immediately struck in the head by a machine gun bullet and gunned down" when "Chinese soldiers began shooting," and they concluded that "the bullet must have been fired from one of the buildings on Shakee Street slightly above the floor where he was located."

Additional injuries on the Shameen side included customs commissioner A.H.F. Edwardes, merchant V.G. Murrel, three Japanese and two French civilians, including Taniguchi Gengo of the Japanese Oriental News Agency. One of the Japanese victims sustained a penetrating abdominal wound.

From the British Navy, Petty Officer Chalmers was injured, along with several other British and French marines.

== Reception ==
On July 1st, during the opening ceremony for the third class of the Whampoa Military Academy, Chiang Kai-shek, serving as the academy's principal, remarked in his speech:

"Amid the tragedy of the Shameen Massacre, there lies a certain impression of light — while the living are grieved and enraged, the dead have fulfilled their purpose."

The Whampoa Academy compiled a volume titled Party Cadets of the Military Academy Who Perished in the Shaji Massacre, to which Zhou Enlai contributed a memorial essay. He also wrote a eulogy for the academy soldiers killed in the incident:

"They shed their blood at Shaji, mortal enemies of imperialism; they marched on to Chaoshan and Guangzhou as vanguard of the National Revolution."

Deng Zhongxia saw the incident as a repetition of the "massacres in Shanghai, Hankou, Qingdao," now reenacted in Guangzhou. Yet, as he noted, the British and French actions only "further fueled the Chinese people's determination to resist, prompting broader support from all sectors for the Canton-Hong Kong strike."

Mao Zedong categorized the May 30th Massacre and the Shaji killings as "concrete evidence of imperialism and its 'white terror.'"

In the aftermath, Chinese Communist Party General Secretary Chen Duxiu called for the expansion of a "National Federation," organization of a "Central Congress," arming of the masses, formation of "Self-Defense Corps," expansion of the "Anti-Imperialist National Army," continuation of boycotts and strikes, and the abolition of "unequal treaties" to resist "imperialism and sycophantic warlords."

Qu Qiubai argued that the post–May 30th anti-imperialist mass movement in China, unlike the northern "traitorous Zhili-Fengtian warlords," had in Guangzhou the strongest anti-imperialist force — the Nationalist government. He stated it not only supported the mass movements in Guangdong and Hong Kong with real power but also led the national anti-imperialist struggle politically. He emphasized that since revolutionary forces held power in Guangzhou, Britain, "despite carrying out the largest massacre in Shaji," could not crush the Guangdong workers and peasants' movement. He urged Guangzhou to persist in leading the "most enduring and greatest movement."

In June 1926, on the first anniversary of the incident, Chiang Kai-shek addressed Whampoa cadets:

"On this day last year, over a hundred of our compatriots were brutally murdered by imperialists. In response, workers in Canton and Hong Kong sustained a strike, crippling Hong Kong's economy to this day. Therefore, we must never forget June 23. From now on, we must focus on ensuring final victory in the strike, forcing the British to yield and abolishing all unequal treaties imposed on China by imperialism... We must reclaim Hong Kong and crush British imperialism!"

Meanwhile, the Swedish consul in Guangzhou — formerly stationed in the Soviet Union — commented that the Guangzhou Bolsheviks were not yet powerful enough to fully implement their agenda. He believed that after defeating their Yunnanese rivals, the Bolsheviks began an intense anti-foreign campaign, using the "unequal treaties" and the Shanghai "incident" (regardless of who provoked it) to rally public support. However, these alone failed to generate sufficient fervor, and so, in his view, they arranged a significant event in Guangzhou to boost mass backing.

From the British colonial side in Hong Kong, some voices accused the Guangzhou authorities of "deliberately and ruthlessly trying to starve out Shameen, destroy its trade," and alleged that Whampoa cadets — under the leadership of Russian officers—had launched “senseless, organized, and brutal attacks on Shameen and its women and children." These commentators claimed that Guangzhou authorities wanted to drag them down into the same chaos, authoritarianism, crime, poverty, and misery they associated with both Guangzhou and Soviet Russia. The "lies" about the Shameen shooting, they said, were being repeated without question, and the term "massacre" was unjustly used.

The French Committee on Asia (Comité de l'Asie Française), speaking from the viewpoint of the French Empire, interpreted the string of Sino-foreign conflicts from May 30th to the Shameen Incident as a Soviet strategy. They argued that the Soviets deeply understood the Chinese national psyche and were using Wilsonian rhetoric to stir nationalist violence under the guise of opposing communism—thus paving the way for eventual communist rule. They believed that traditional Chinese xenophobia, a reawakened national consciousness, social disintegration amid prolonged unrest, and Bolshevik propaganda together formed the roots of this movement. For them, it marked the prelude to a Pacific tragedy and suggested that the Far East was on the brink of a racial war.

== See also ==
- Liao Chengzhi, a survivor of the Shakee Massacre
