= Shaji, Guangzhou =

Area of Guangzhou, China

Coordinates: 23.1081°N 113.2519°E

Shaji (Chinese: 沙基; pinyin: Shājī; Jyutping: saa^{1}gei^{1}, also romanized as Shakee and Shakei) is an area adjacent to Yanjiang West Road (沿江西路) in the Liwan District of Guangzhou City, Guangdong Province, China. It lies opposite Shamian Island where on 23 June 1925, there was a massacre in which Chinese demonstrators and one French merchant died in an exchange of fire between British and French marines guarding the foreign concessions and cadets from the Whampoa Military Academy.

== See also ==
- Shameen Incident
