= Renmin Bridge =

Renmin Bridge 人民桥
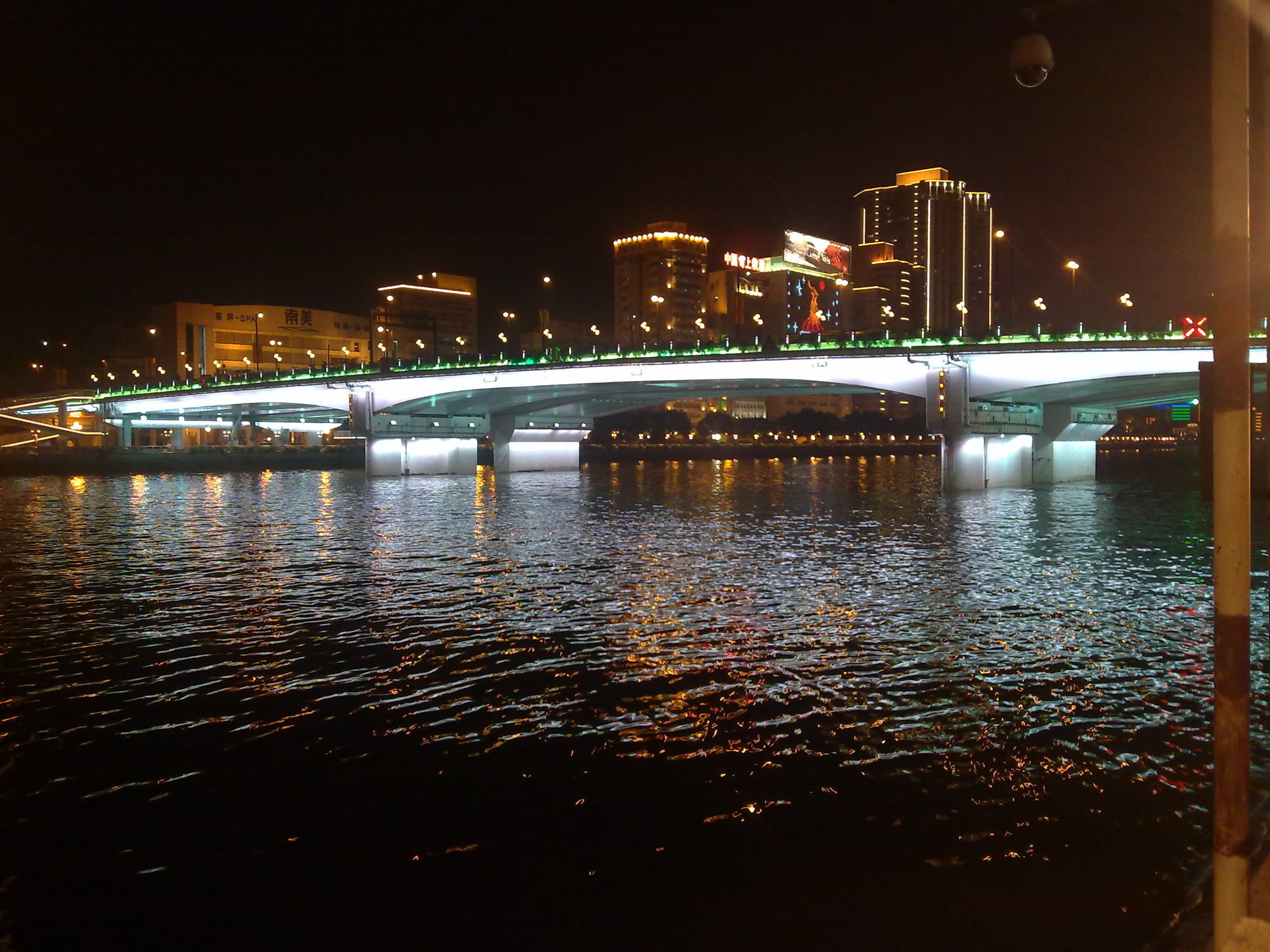
- Coordinates: 23.108333°N 113.245278°E
- Carries: 9 lanes of the Guangzhou Inner Ring Road
- Crosses: Pearl River
- Locale: Guangzhou, Guangdong, China
- Other name: The People’s Bridge

Characteristics
- Design: Beam bridge

History
- Construction end: 1967

Location
- Interactive map of Renmin Bridge

Renmin Bridge (Chinese: 人民桥; pinyin: Rénmín Qiáo, literally “People’s Bridge”) is a bridge crossing the Pearl River in Guangzhou, Guangdong, China. On its north is 623 Rd (六二三路)

Renmin Bridge connects Haizhu District with Liwan District, and was the second highway bridge to be put into service in Guangzhou (after Haizhu Bridge) when it was completed in 1967. Guangzhou's Inner Ring Road passes over the bridge, making it a major traffic artery in the city.

Guangzhou's annual Dragon Boat Race takes place between Renmin Bridge and Jiefang Bridge.

Scenic Shamian Island lies directly upstream (east) of the bridge.
