= Huangpu Bridge =

Huangpu Bridge 黄埔大桥
- Coordinates: 23.068611°N 113.480833°E
- Carries: G0425 and G1508
- Crosses: Pearl River
- Locale: Guangzhou, Guangdong, China

Characteristics
- Design: Suspension bridge and Cable-stayed bridge
- Total length: 7,049 m (23,127 ft)
- Width: 41.69 metres (136.8 ft)
- Height: 226.14 m (741.9 ft) (north); 192.47 m (631.5 ft) (south)
- Longest span: 383 m (1,257 ft) (north); 1,108 m (3,635 ft) (south)

History
- Construction start: 23 December 2003
- Opened: 16 December 2008

Location
- Interactive map of Huangpu Bridge

The Huangpu Bridge carries expressway traffic over two branches of the Pearl River in Guangzhou, Guangdong, China. The bridge is a combined suspension and cable-stayed bridge. The suspension bridge portion crosses the south western channel and has a main span of 1,108 metres (3,635 ft). As of 2012 the suspension bridge span is one of the ten longest in China and among the 20 longest in the world. The cable stayed portion spans 383 metres (1,257 ft) over the north east channel with a 201 metres (659 ft) high pylon.

Elevation of the Huangpu Bridge

The total length of the bridge is 7,016 metres (23,018 ft). Construction of the bridge began in December 2003 and it was opened for traffic in December 2008. The bridge carries traffic on the G0425 Guangzhou–Macau Expressway and the G1508 Guangzhou Ring Expressway.

== See also ==
- List of bridges in China
- List of longest suspension bridge spans
- List of tallest bridges
