= Hedong Bridge =

Hedong Bridge 鹤洞大桥
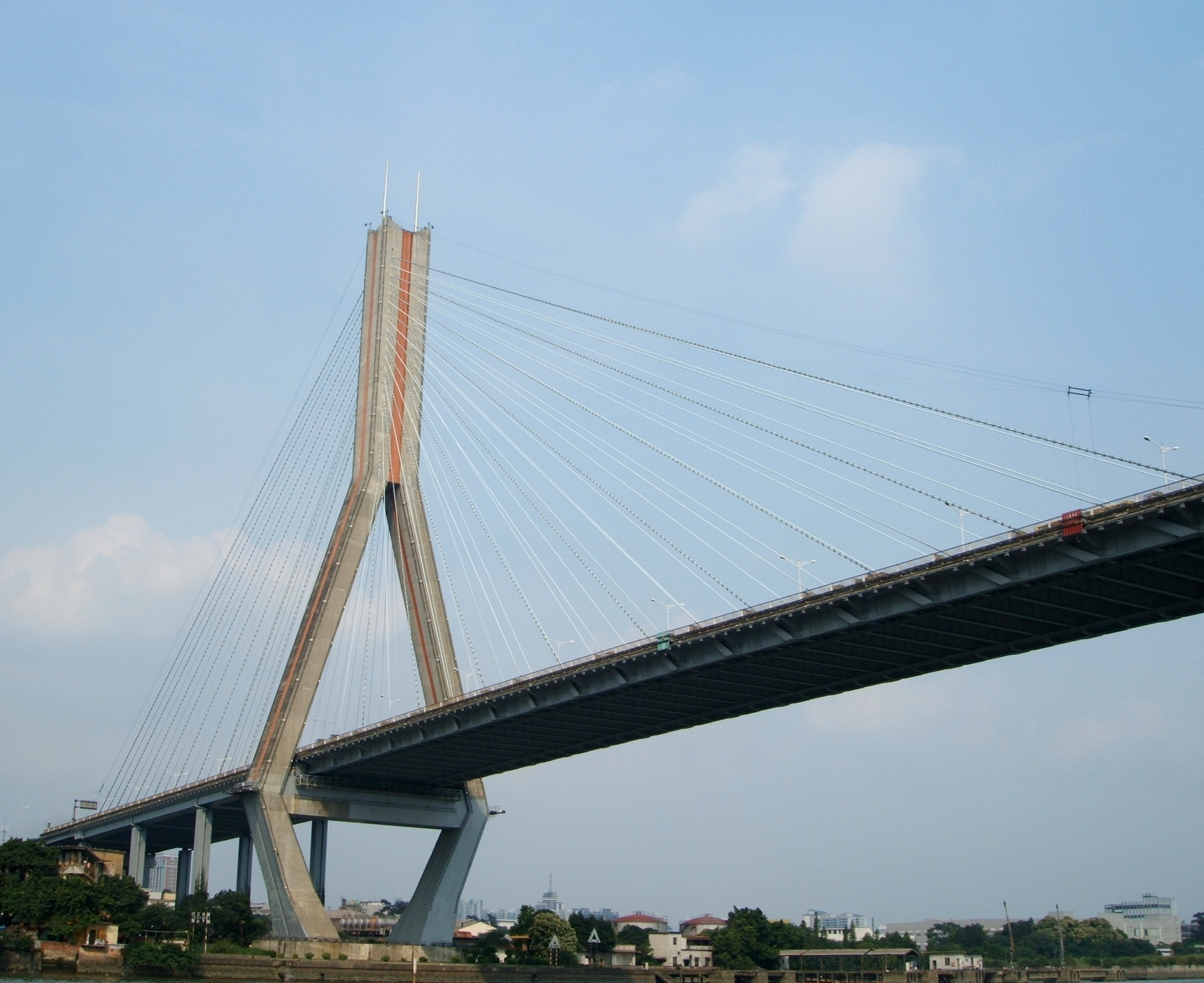
- Coordinates: 23.082222°N 113.248417°E
- Carries: Hedong Road - Changgang Middle Road
- Crosses: Pearl River
- Locale: Guangzhou, Guangdong, China

Characteristics
- Design: Cable-stayed bridge
- Total length: 2,300 metres (7,546 ft)
- Longest span: 360 metres (1,181 ft)

History
- Opened: 1998

Location
- Interactive map of Hedong Bridge

The Hedong Bridge is a cable stayed bridge located in Guangzhou, Guangdong, China. Opened in 1998, it has a main span of 360 metres (1,180 ft). The bridge carries traffic between Liwan District, west of the river and Haizhu District to the east.

The bridge's daily traffic is 130,000 cars.

In 2021, construction work on the bridge consisted in the replacement of 144 stay cables, the layout of 40,000 square meters of noise-reducing pavement, and the application of anti-corrosion coating.
