= Jiefang Bridge =

Jiefang Bridge 解放大桥
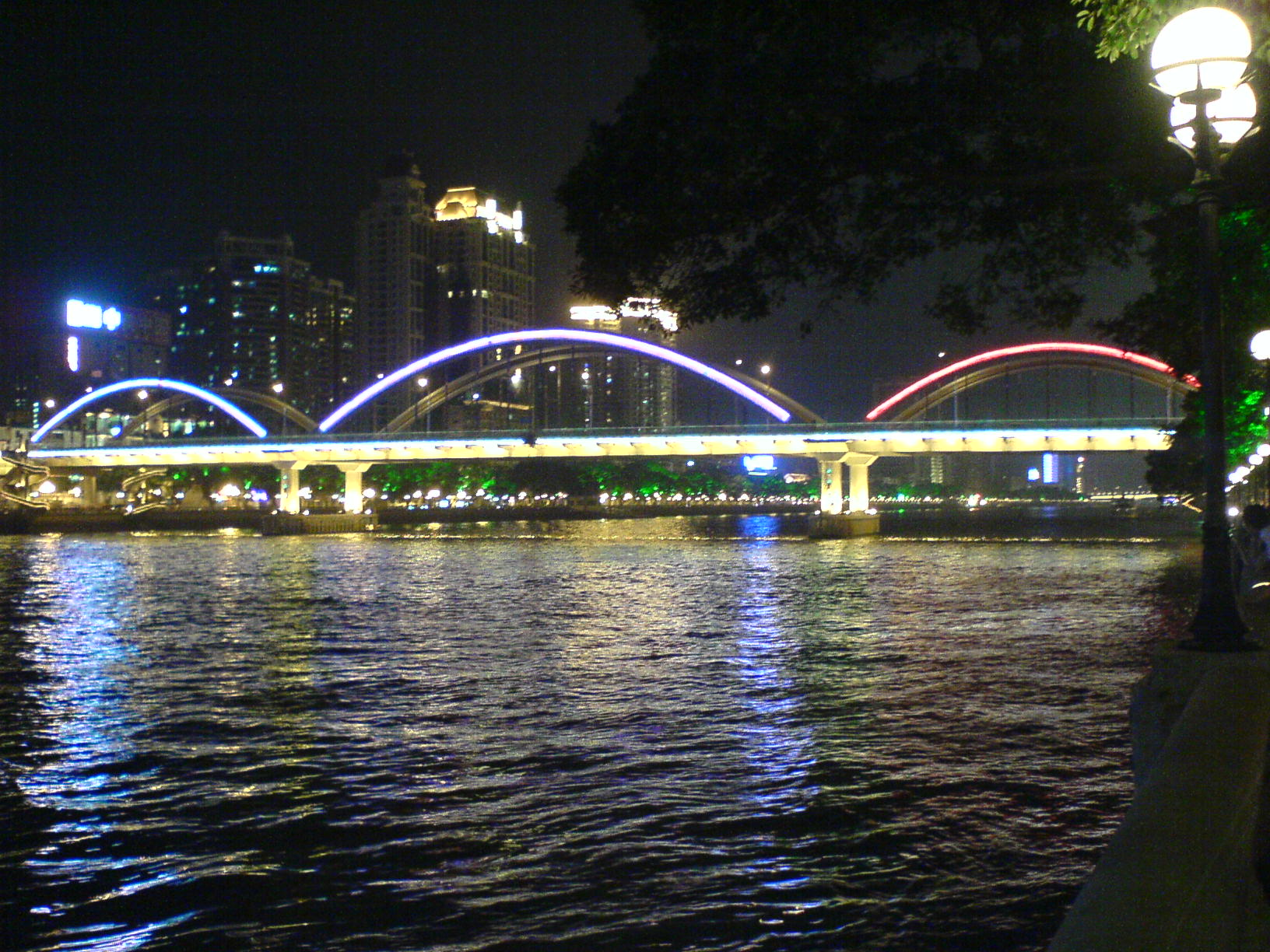
- Jiefang Bridge at night, as viewed from the north bank of the Pearl River
- Coordinates: 23°06′51″N 113°15′31″E
- Crosses: Pearl River
- Locale: Guangzhou, Guangdong, China

Characteristics
- Longest span: 85 m

History
- Opened: February 1998

Location
- Interactive map of Jiefang Bridge

Jiefang Bridge (Chinese: 解放大桥, literally “Liberation Bridge”) is a bridge in Guangzhou, China. The bridge connects the Haizhu District with the Yuexiu District, and is one of nine bridges connecting Haizhu with downtown Guangzhou and the business districts. On its north side is Jiefang South Rd (解放南路) and on its south side is Tongqing Rd (同庆路).

Guangzhou's annual Dragon Boat Race takes place between Jiefang Bridge and Renmin Bridge.
