= Jiangwan Bridge =

Jiangwan Bridge 江湾大桥
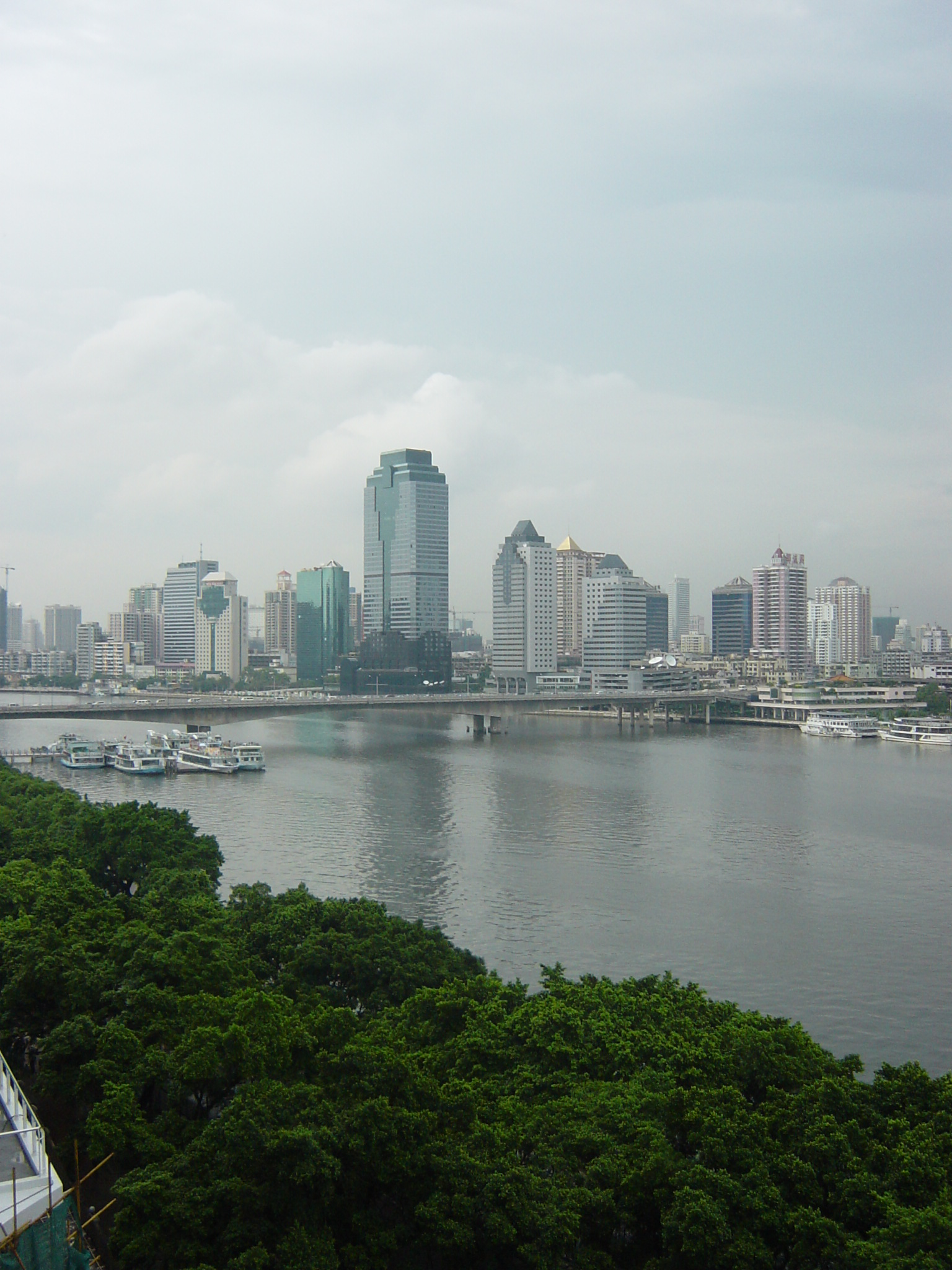
- Coordinates: 23°06′54″N 113°16′26″E
- Crosses: Pearl River
- Locale: Guangzhou, Guangdong, China

History
- Opened: January 1998

Location
- Interactive map of Jiangwan Bridge

Jiangwan Bridge (Chinese: 江湾大桥) is a bridge crossing over the Pearl River in Guangzhou, Guangdong, China. Guangzhou's Inner Ring Road runs across the Bridge, connecting the Haizhu District with the Yuexiu District.

On the northern bank of Jiangwan Bridge is Dashatou wharf, one of the main passenger wharves in Guangzhou's extensive river passenger transport system.

Immediately to the west of the Haizhu ramp of the bridge sits Dabenying, one of many former residences of Sun Yat-sen, himself a native of Cuiheng, part of then Canton (Guangzhou) prefecture. Today the mansion is open to the public and serves as The Memorial Museum of Generalissimo Sun Yat-sen's Mansion.
