= Pearl River =

Major river in southern China

Coordinates: 22°46′N 113°38′E

Pearl River (珠江) Canton River (粤江; 粵江)
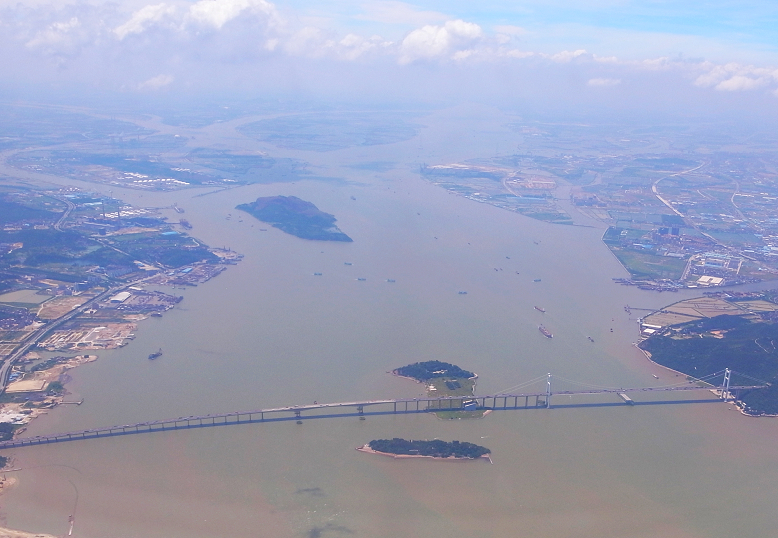
- Pearl River in Humen near Humen Town

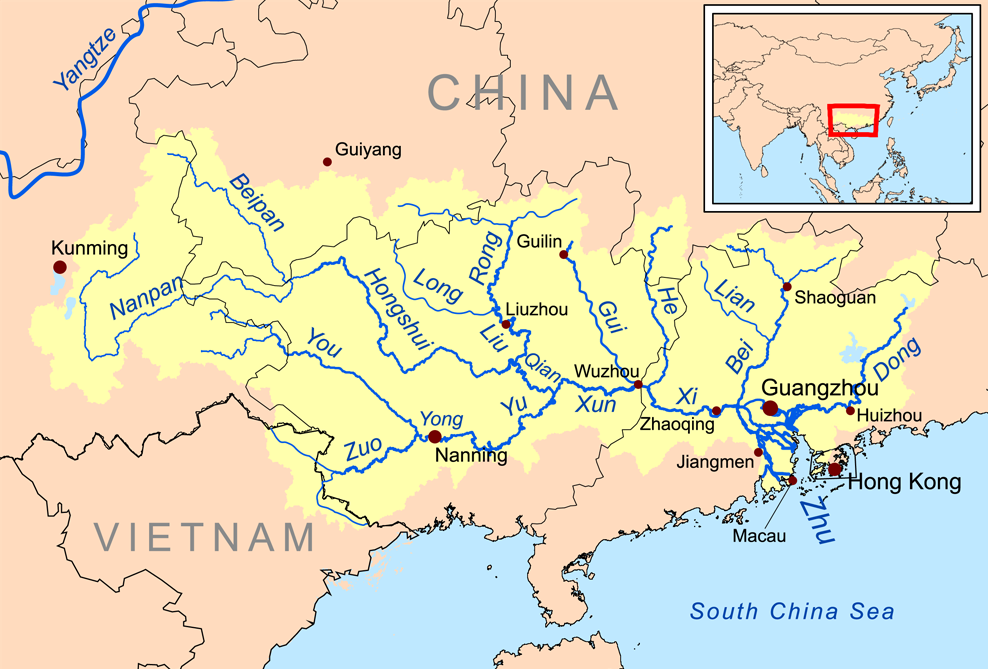
- The course of the Pearl River system through China and Vietnam

Location
- Country: China, Vietnam
- Province: Yunnan, Guizhou, Guangxi, Guangdong, Hong Kong, Macau, Cao Bằng, Lạng Sơn

Physical characteristics
- Source: various sources of its tributaries
- Mouth: South China Sea
  - location: Guangdong
  - elevation: 0 m (0 ft)
- Length: 359 km (223 mi) (Pearl–Xi–Xun–Qian–Hongshui–Nanpan 2,271.8 km (1,411.6 mi) to 2,400 km (1,500 mi))
- Basin size: 453,700 km^{2} (175,200 sq mi)
- Discharge
  - location: Pearl Delta
  - average: (Period: 2010–2020)9,631 m^{3}/s (340,100 cu ft/s) 9,500 m^{3}/s (340,000 cu ft/s)
  - minimum: 3,600 m^{3}/s (130,000 cu ft/s)
  - maximum: 34,000 m^{3}/s (1,200,000 cu ft/s)

Basin features
- Progression: South China Sea
- River system: Pearl River
- Tributaries
  - left: Bei ('north'), Dong ('east')
  - right: Xi ('west')

Pearl River
- Chinese: 珠江
Transcriptions
Standard Mandarin
- Hanyu Pinyin: Zhūjiāng
- IPA: [ʈʂú tɕjáŋ]
Yue: Cantonese
- Yale Romanization: Jyūgōng
- Jyutping: Zyu1 Gong1
- IPA: [tsy˥ kɔŋ˥]

Canton River
- Traditional Chinese: 粵江
- Simplified Chinese: 粤江
- Literal meaning: Guangdong River
Transcriptions
Standard Mandarin
- Hanyu Pinyin: Yuèjiāng
Yue: Cantonese
- Yale Romanization: Yuhtgōng
- Jyutping: Jyut6 Gong1
- IPA: [jyt̚˨ kɔŋ˥]

The Pearl River (Chinese: 珠江; pinyin: Zhūjiāng; lit. 'pearl river', or 粤江; 粵江; Yuèjiāng; 'Yue river') is an extensive river system in southern China. "Pearl River" is often also used as a catch-all for the watersheds of the Pearl tributaries within Guangdong, specifically the Xi ('west'), Bei ('north'), and Dong ('east'). These rivers all ultimately flow into the South China Sea through the Pearl River Delta. Measured from the furthest reaches of the Xi River, the Pearl–Xi–Xun–Qian–Hongshui–Nanpan 2,400 km (1,500 mi) Pearl River system constitutes China's third-longest, after the Yangtze River and the Yellow River, and its second largest by volume, after the Yangtze. The 453,700 km^{2} (175,200 mi^{2}) Pearl River Basin drains the majority of Guangdong and Guangxi provinces (collectively known as Liangguang), as well as parts of Yunnan, Guizhou, Hunan and Jiangxi. It also drains the northernmost parts of Vietnam's Northeast Cao Bằng and Lạng Sơn provinces. The Pearl River is famed as the river that flows through Guangzhou.

In addition to referring to the system as a whole, the Pearl River name is applied to a specific branch within it. This Pearl River is the widest distributary within the delta, although notably short. The waters that converge east of the Bei are first referred to as the Pearl River just north of Guangzhou. The Pearl River's estuary, Bocca Tigris, is regularly dredged so as to keep it open for ocean vessels. The mouth of the Pearl River forms a large bay in the southeast of the delta, the Pearl River Estuary, the Bocca Tigris separates Shiziyang in the north, Lingdingyang in the south, and Jiuzhouyang at the southern tip of the estuary surrounded by the Wanshan Archipelago. This bay separates Macau and Zhuhai from Hong Kong and Shenzhen.

The name "Pearl River" comes from the pearl-colored shells that lie within the Pearl's riverbed as it flows through the city of Guangzhou. A 500 kV power line, suspended from three of the tallest pylons in the world, crosses the river near the Nansha Bridge.

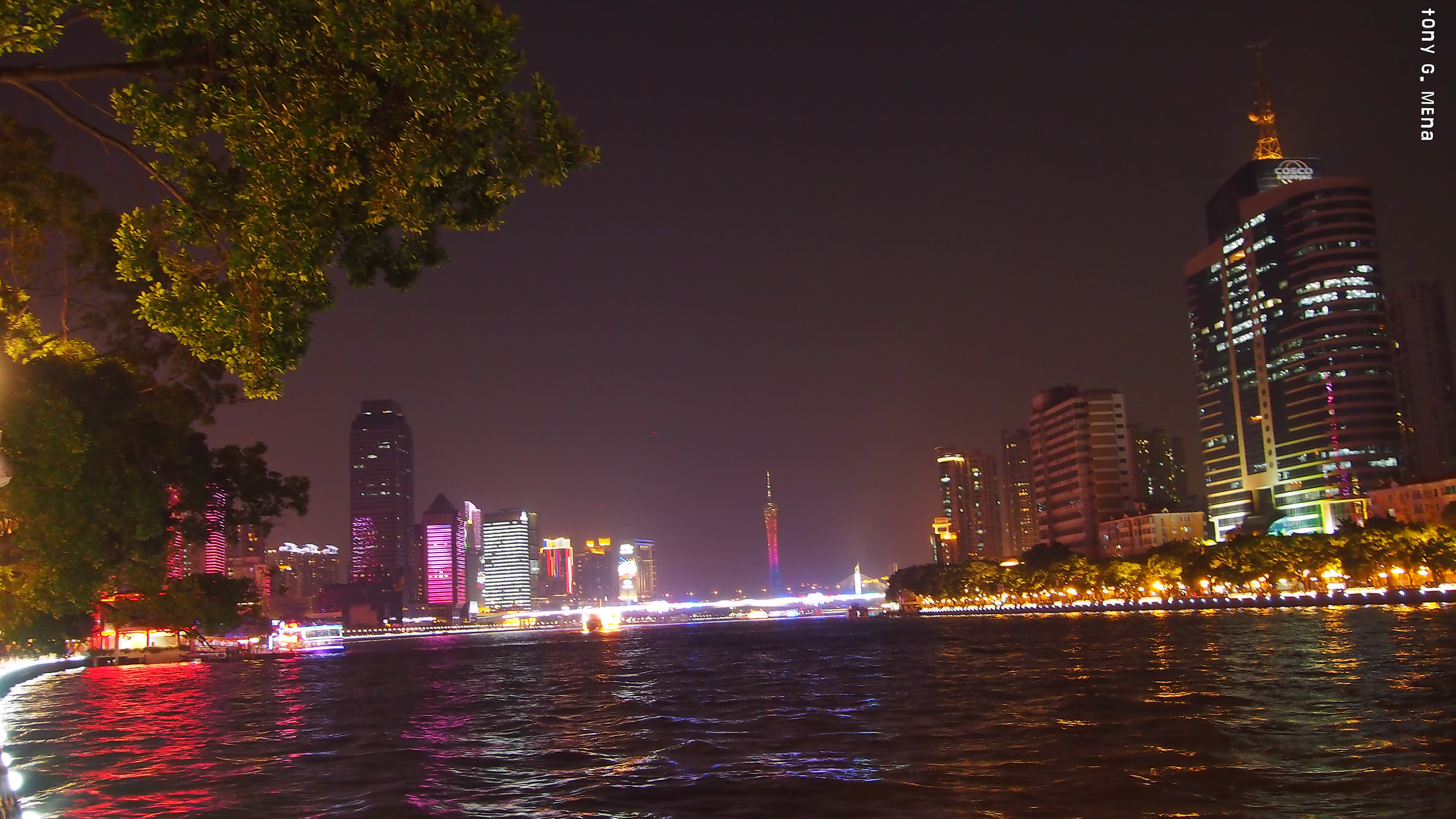
River Pearl and Canton Tower

== Settlements ==
- Liuzhou
- Guilin
- Dongguan
- Foshan
- Zhuhai
- Panyu
- Zhongshan
- Guangzhou
- Hong Kong
- Macau
- Shenzhen
- Wuzhou
- Zhaoqing
- Nanning
- Guiping
- Baise

== Crossings ==
- Guangzhou Bridge
- Haiyin Bridge
- Haizhu Bridge
- Hong Kong-Zhuhai-Macau Bridge
- Huanan Bridge
- Humen Pearl River Bridge
- Hedong Bridge
- Huangpu Bridge
- Jiangwan Bridge
- Jiefang Bridge
- Nansha Bridge
- Pazhou Bridge
- Renmin Bridge
- Shiziyang Tunnel
- Xinguang Bridge
- Yajisha Bridge
- Shenzhen–Zhongshan Bridge

== Tributaries ==
- Bei
- Dong
  - Beilingshui
  - Li
  - Xinfeng
  - Qiuxiang
  - Gongzhuangshui
  - Xizhi
  - Shimahe
- Xi
  - Yu
    - Yong
      - Zuo
      - You
  - Xun
    - Qiang
    - Liu
      - Rong
      - Hongshui
        - Beipan
        - Nanpan
          - Ba
  - Gui
    - Li

== In culture ==
Numerous brands are named after the river. The Zhujiang Brewery in Guangzhou is one of the three largest domestic breweries in China, and Pearl River Bridge is a popular food manufacturer in the city.

== See also ==
- List of rivers in China
- Geography of China
- Ship lifts in China
- List of rivers of Hong Kong
- Pearl River Sources
