= Xinguang Bridge =

Xinguang Bridge 新光大桥
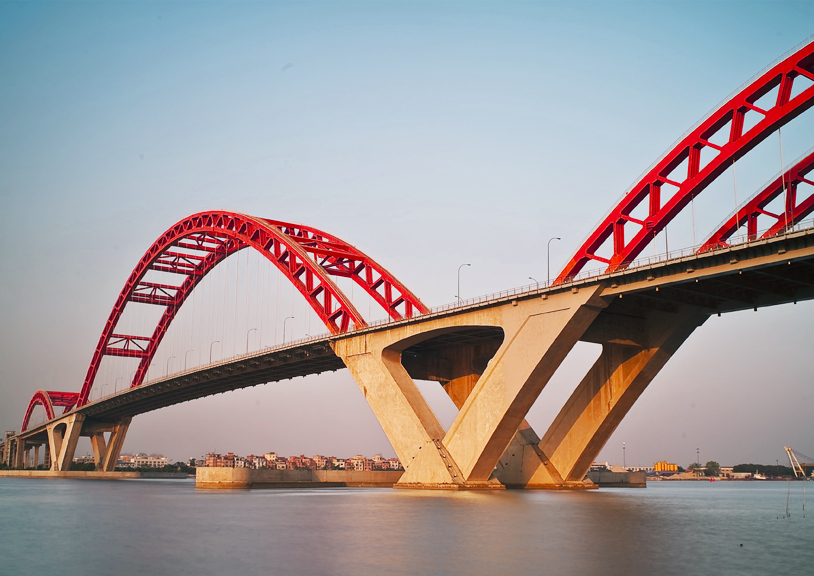
- Coordinates: 23.052778°N 113.321722°E
- Carries: Xinguang Expressway
- Crosses: Pearl River
- Locale: Guangzhou, Guangdong, China

Characteristics
- Design: Arch bridge
- Total length: 782 metres (2,566 ft)
- Longest span: 428 metres (1,404 ft)

History
- Construction cost: 400 million Yuan (US$40 million)
- Opened: 2008

Location
- Interactive map of Xinguang Bridge

The Xinguang Bridge is an arch bridge located in Guangzhou, Guangdong, China. Opened in 2008, it has a main span of 428 metres (1,404 ft) making it one of the ten longest arch bridge spans in the world.

== See also ==
- List of longest arch bridge spans
