= Haiyin Bridge =

Haiyin Bridge 海印大桥
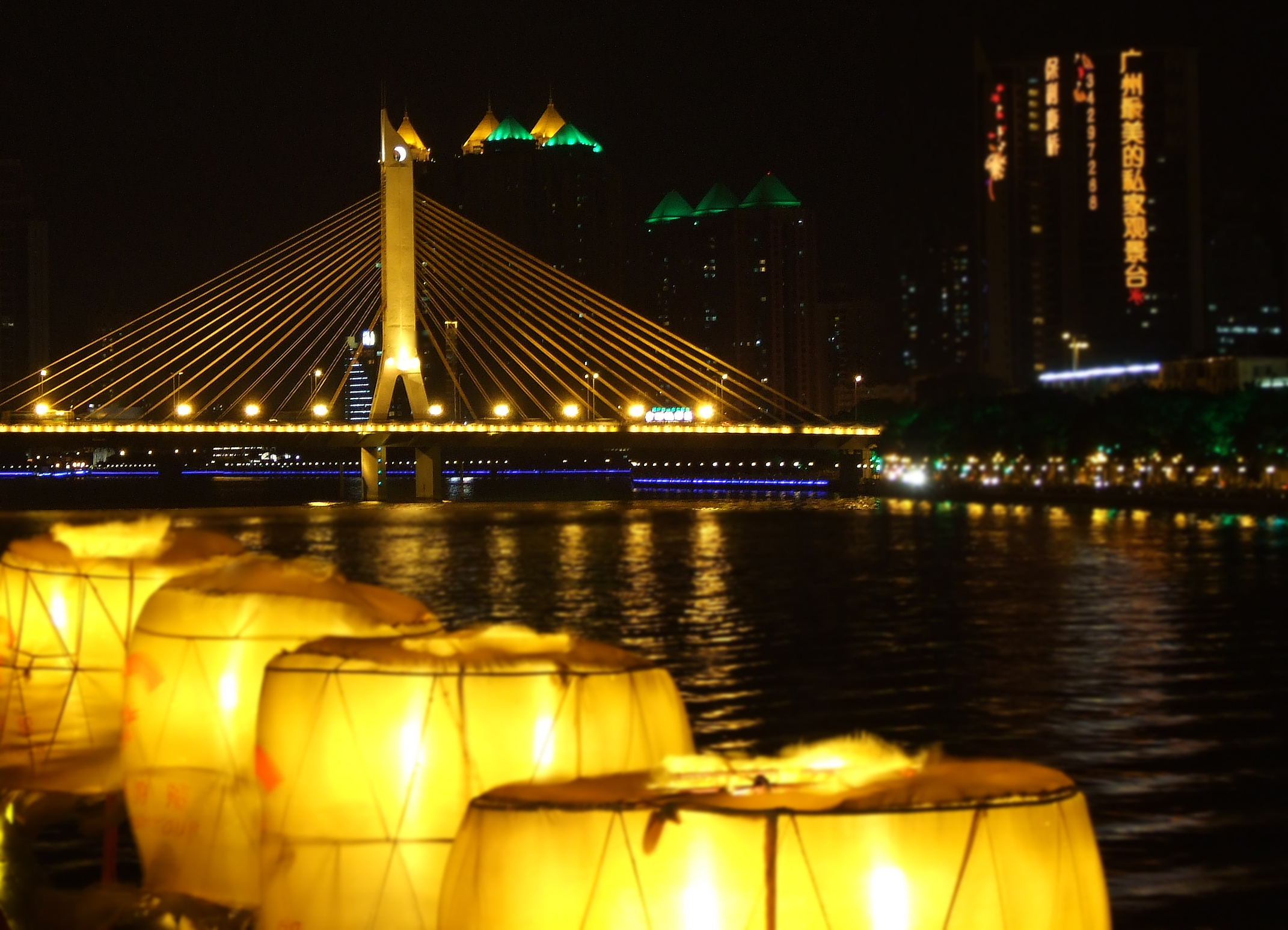
- Haiyin Bridge, as seen from a river night cruise vessel on the Pearl River
- Coordinates: 23°6′43″N 113°16′54″E
- Crosses: Pearl River
- Locale: Guangzhou, Guangdong, China

History
- Opened: December 1988

Location
- Interactive map of Haiyin Bridge

Haiyin Bridge (simplified Chinese: 海印大桥; traditional Chinese: 海印大橋; pinyin: Hǎiyìn dàqiáo) is a bridge crossing the Pearl River in Guangzhou, China.

The double tower single plane cable stayed bridge was completed in 1988 and connects Haizhu District with Yuexiu District.
