= Pazhou Bridge =

Pazhou Bridge 琶洲大桥
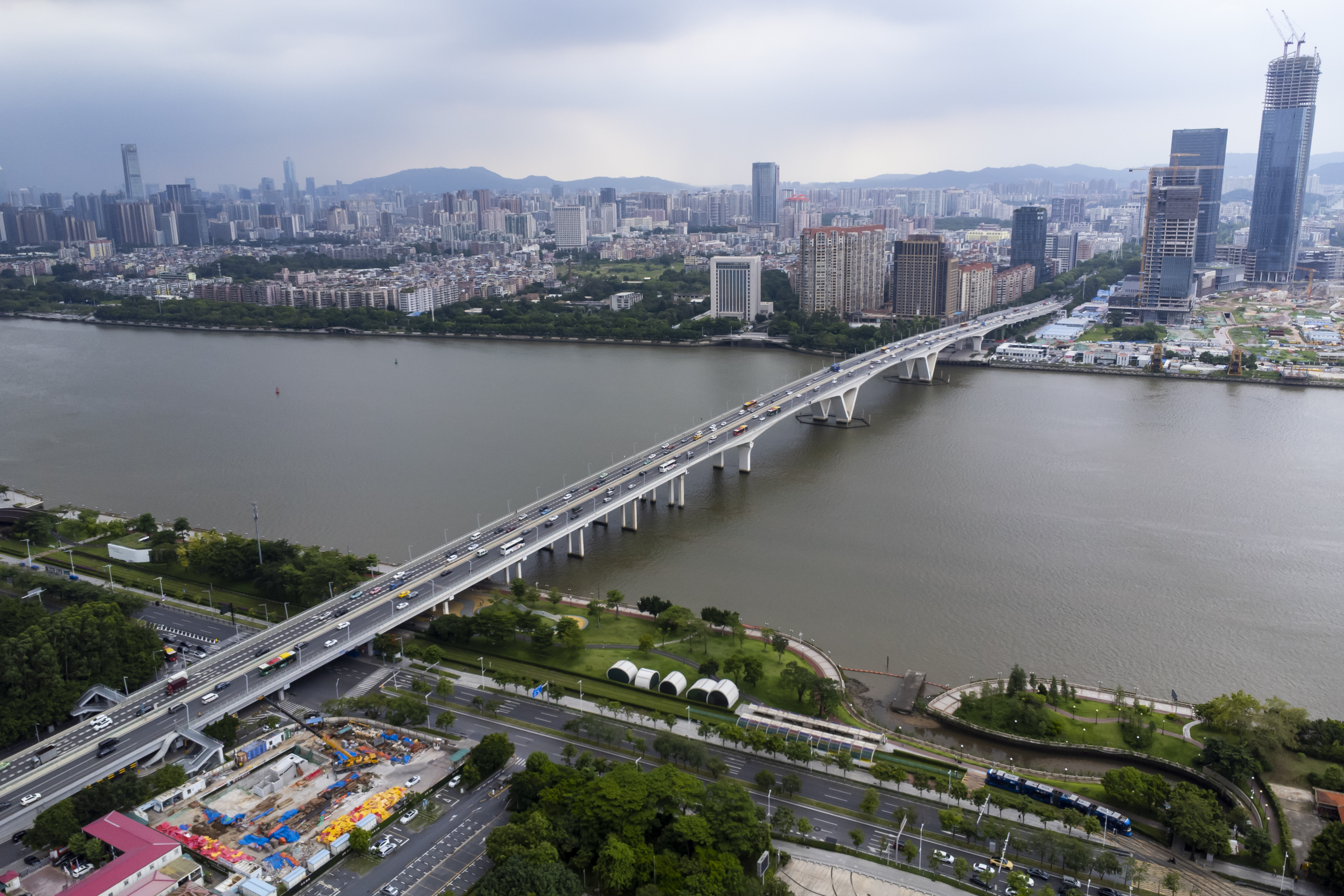
- Pazhou Bridge. The nearer bank is Haizhu District, while the farther bank is Tianhe District.
- Coordinates: 23°06′37″N 113°22′07″E
- Crosses: Pearl River
- Locale: Guangzhou, Guangdong, China

Characteristics
- Longest span: 160 m

Location
- Interactive map of Pazhou Bridge

Pazhou Bridge (simplified Chinese: 琶洲大桥; traditional Chinese: 琶洲大橋; pinyin: Pázhōu dàqiáo) is a bridge in Guangzhou, Guangdong, China. The bridge connects Tianhe District across the Zhujiang River to the southern district of Huangpuchong in Guangzhou.
