= Guangzhou Bridge =

Bridge in Guangzhou, Guangdong, China

Guangzhou Bridge 广州大桥
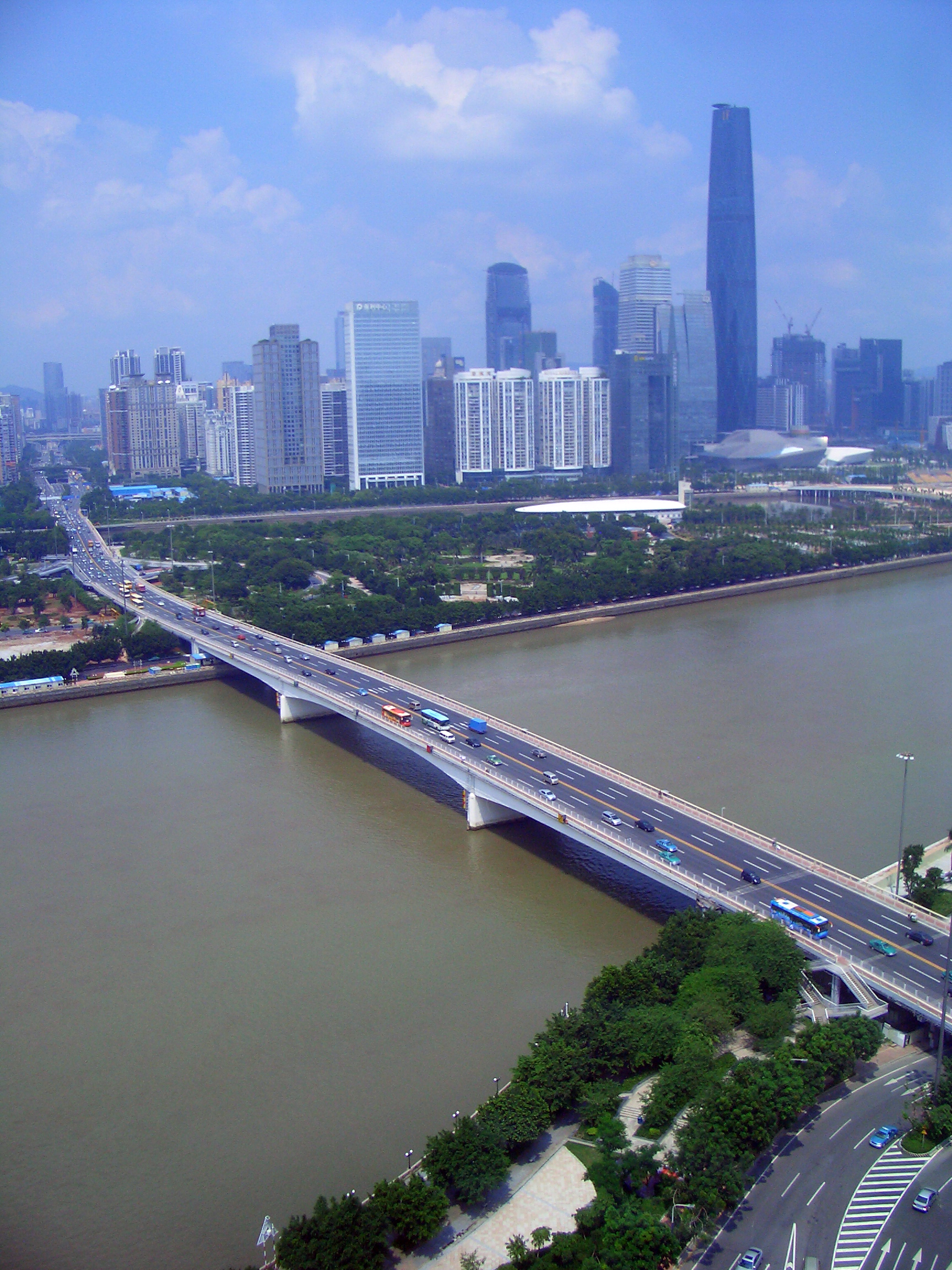
- Guangzhou Bridge with Zhujiang New Town and the Guangzhou Opera House in the background (September 2010)
- Coordinates: 23°6′41″N 113°18′36″E
- Carries: Guangzhou Avenue
- Crosses: Pearl River
- Locale: Guangzhou, Guangdong, China

History
- Opened: May 1985

Location
- Interactive map of Guangzhou Bridge

Guangzhou Bridge (Chinese: 广州大桥; pinyin: Guǎngzhōu Dàqiáo; lit. 'Guangzhou Big Bridge') is a bridge crossing the Pearl River in Guangzhou, Guangdong province, China.

== History ==
Completed in 1985, the bridge was the third to be built across the Pearl River in Guangzhou.

The 1,240 metre bridge carries Guangzhou Avenue across the river and over the eastern tip of Ersha Island, connecting Kecun in Haizhu District with Zhujiang New Town in Tianhe.
