= Yajisha Bridge =

Bridge in People's Republic of China

Yajisha Bridge 丫髻沙大桥
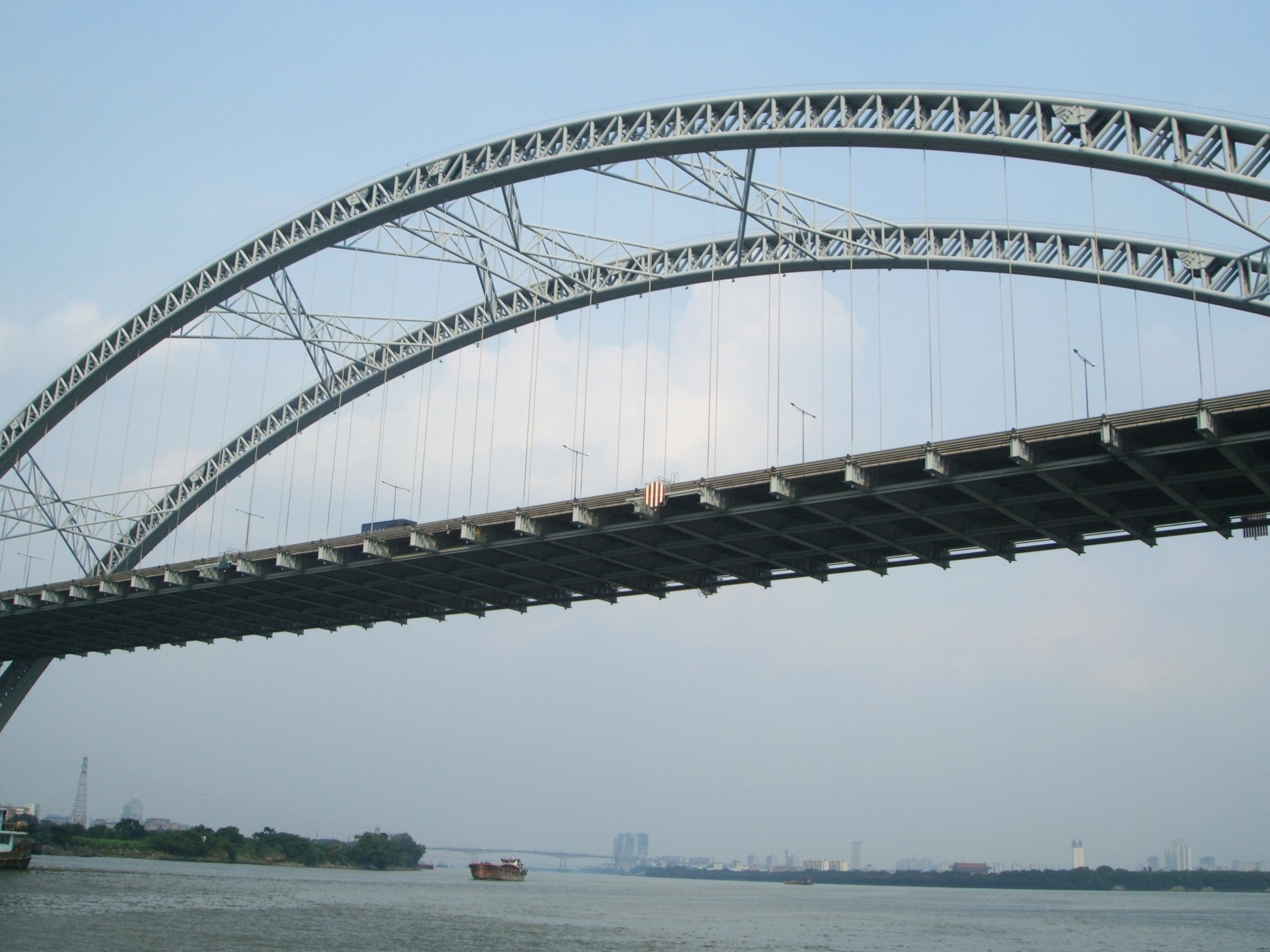
- Coordinates: 23.060111°N 113.268889°E
- Carries: S81 Guangzhou Ring Expressway
- Crosses: Pearl River
- Locale: Guangzhou, Guangdong, China

Characteristics
- Design: Arch bridge
- Total length: 1,084 metres (3,556 ft)
- Longest span: 360 metres (1,181 ft)

History
- Opened: 2000

Location
- Interactive map of Yajisha Bridge

The Yajisha Bridge is an arch bridge located in Guangzhou, Guangdong, China. Opened in 2000, it has a main span of 360 metres (1,180 ft) making it one of the longest arch bridge spans in the world.

== Gallery ==
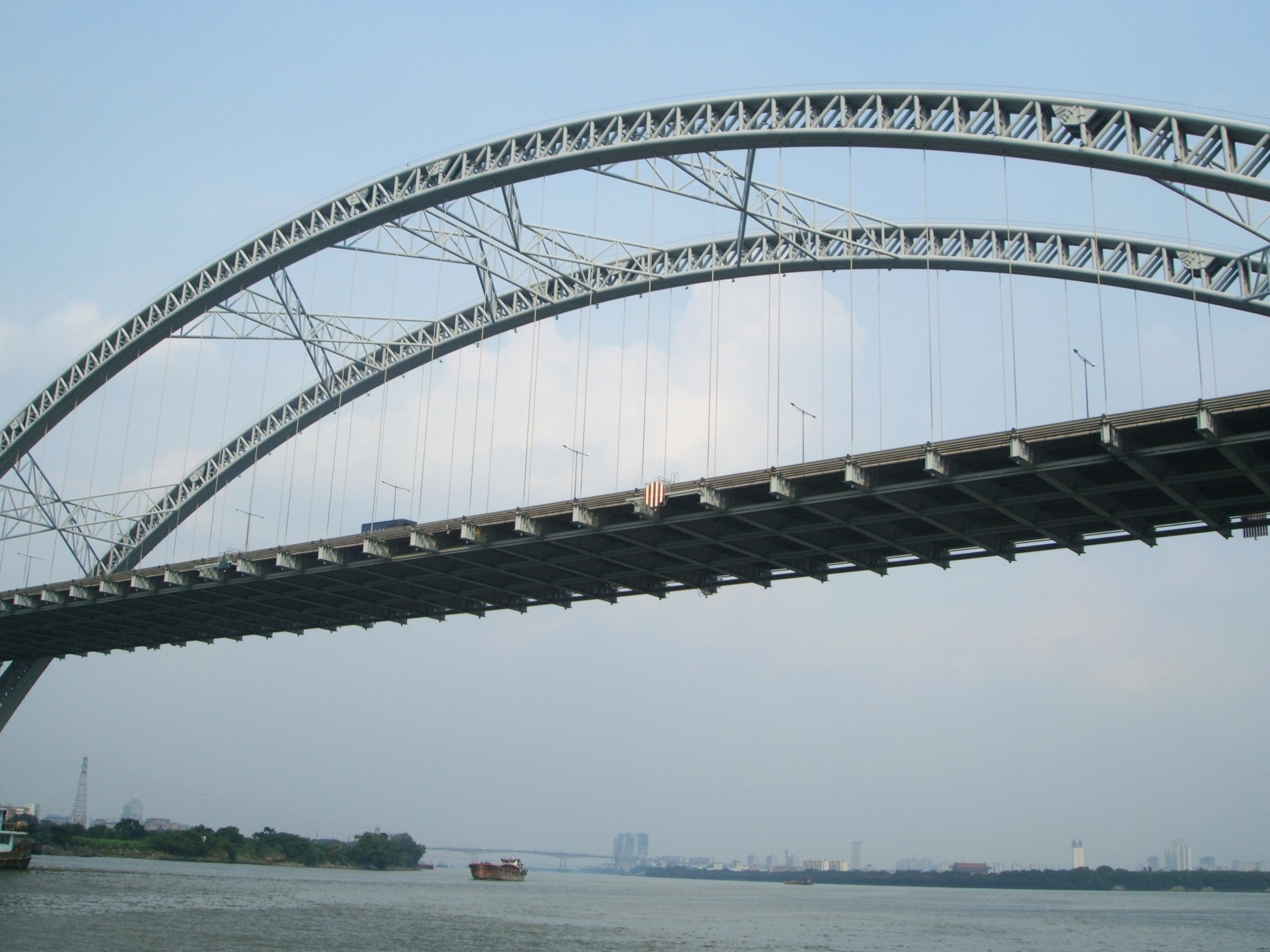
Yanjisha bridge

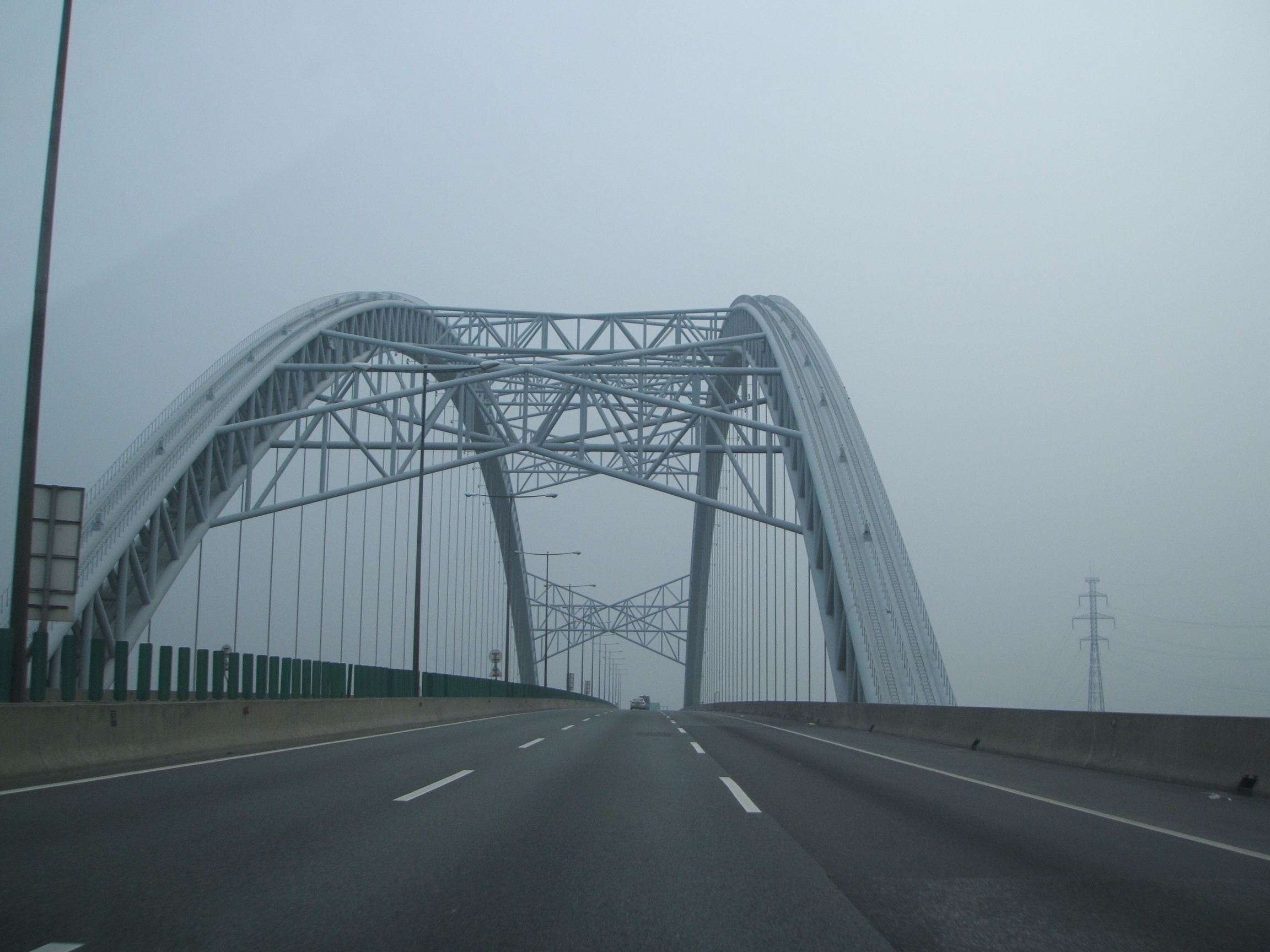
Yanjisha bridge

== See also ==
- List of longest arch bridge spans
