= Haizhu Bridge =

Haizhu Bridge (Hoi Chu Bridge) 海珠桥
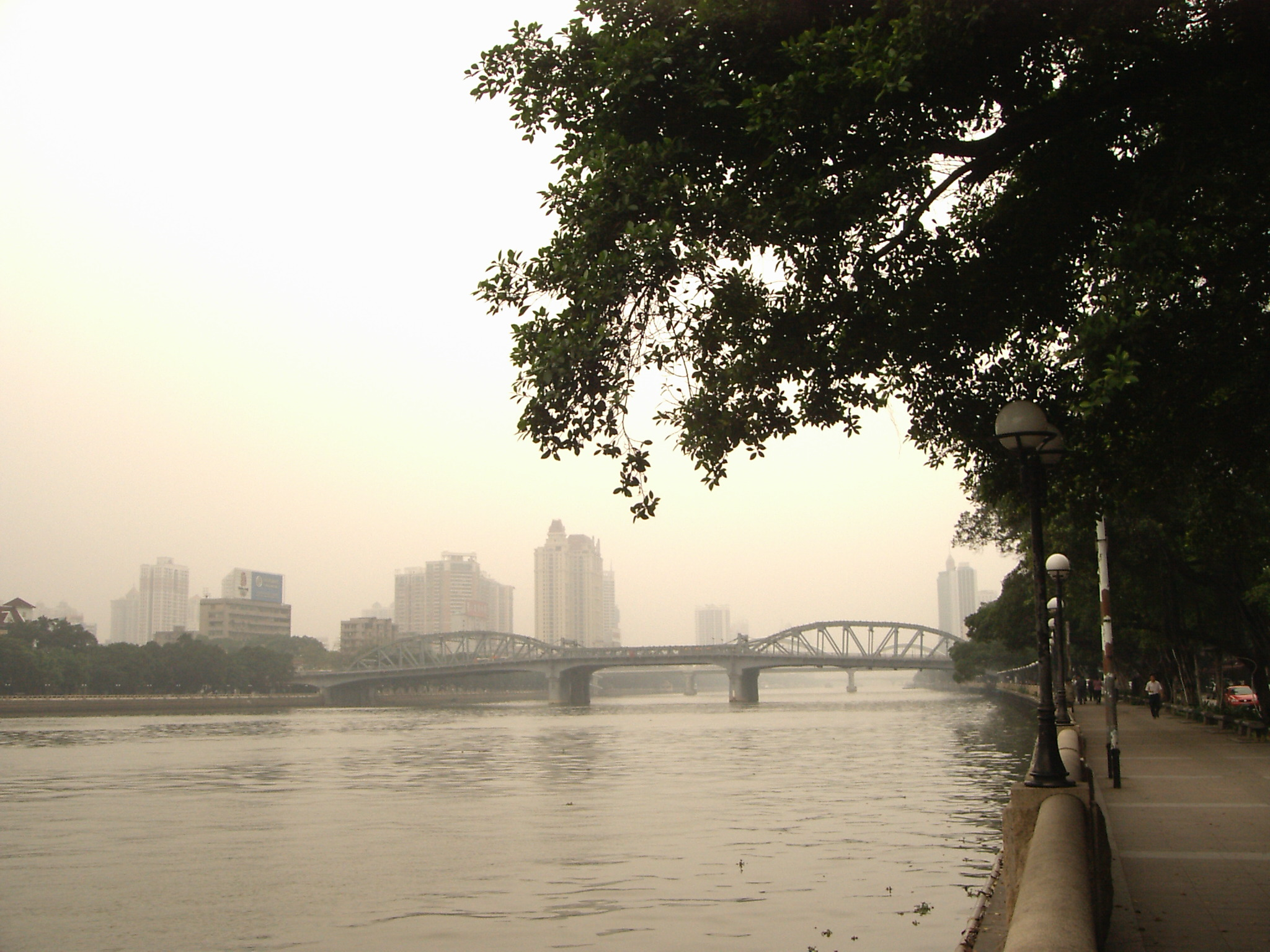
- Haizhu Bridge, as viewed south bank of the river.
- Coordinates: 23.115284°N 113.261741°E
- Crosses: Pearl River
- Locale: Guangzhou, Guangdong, China

History
- Designer: McDonnell & Gorman
- Engineering design by: McDonnell & Gorman
- Constructed by: McDonnell & Gorman
- Opened: February 1933 (old bridge); 25 March 1950 (new bridge)

Location
- Interactive map of Haizhu Bridge (Hoi Chu Bridge)

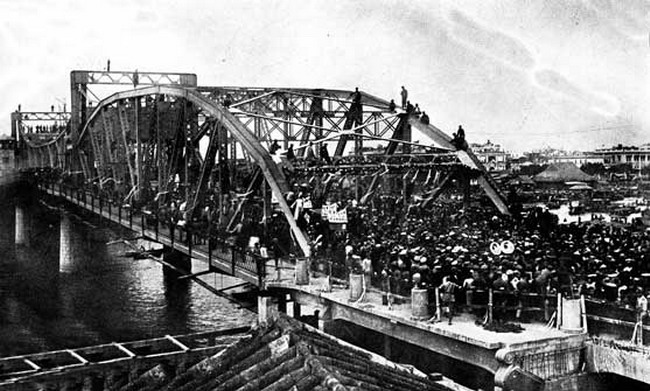
Old Haizhu Bridge (undated photo)

Haizhu Bridge (simplified Chinese: 海珠桥; traditional Chinese: 海珠橋) is an iron bridge across the Pearl River in Guangzhou, China.

The bridge runs from Haizhu Square in Yuexiu District, and south towards Jiangnan Avenue in Haizhu District.

Haizhu Bridge was the first bridge to be built across the Pearl River in Guangzhou. Work started in 1929 and ended in 1933, and was completed by the American contractor Markton Company.

The bridge was damaged by the Japanese in 1938, and again in 1949 by retreating Kuomintang forces.

Today the bridge carries a two-lane, bidirectional road connecting the north and south banks of the Pearl River.

In 2009, the bridge gained notoriety when a number of people threatened suicide by jumping off the bridge.
