= Huanan Bridge =

Huanan Bridge 华南大桥
- Coordinates: 23.107778°N 113.351389°E
- Carries: Huanan Expressway
- Crosses: Pearl River
- Locale: Guangzhou, Guangdong, China

Location
- Interactive map of Huanan Bridge

Huanan Bridge (simplified Chinese: 华南大桥; traditional Chinese: 華南大橋; pinyin: Huánándàqiáo) is a bridge crossing the Pearl River in Guangzhou, China.

The bridge carries the Huanan Expressway, which connects the Haizhu District and southern Panyu District with the Tianhe District. It also serves as an important connection between the grounds of the biannual Canton Fair in Pazhou and the new central business district of Zhujiang New Town.
