= List of tallest buildings in Asia =

Burj Khalifa, Dubai, United Arab Emirates

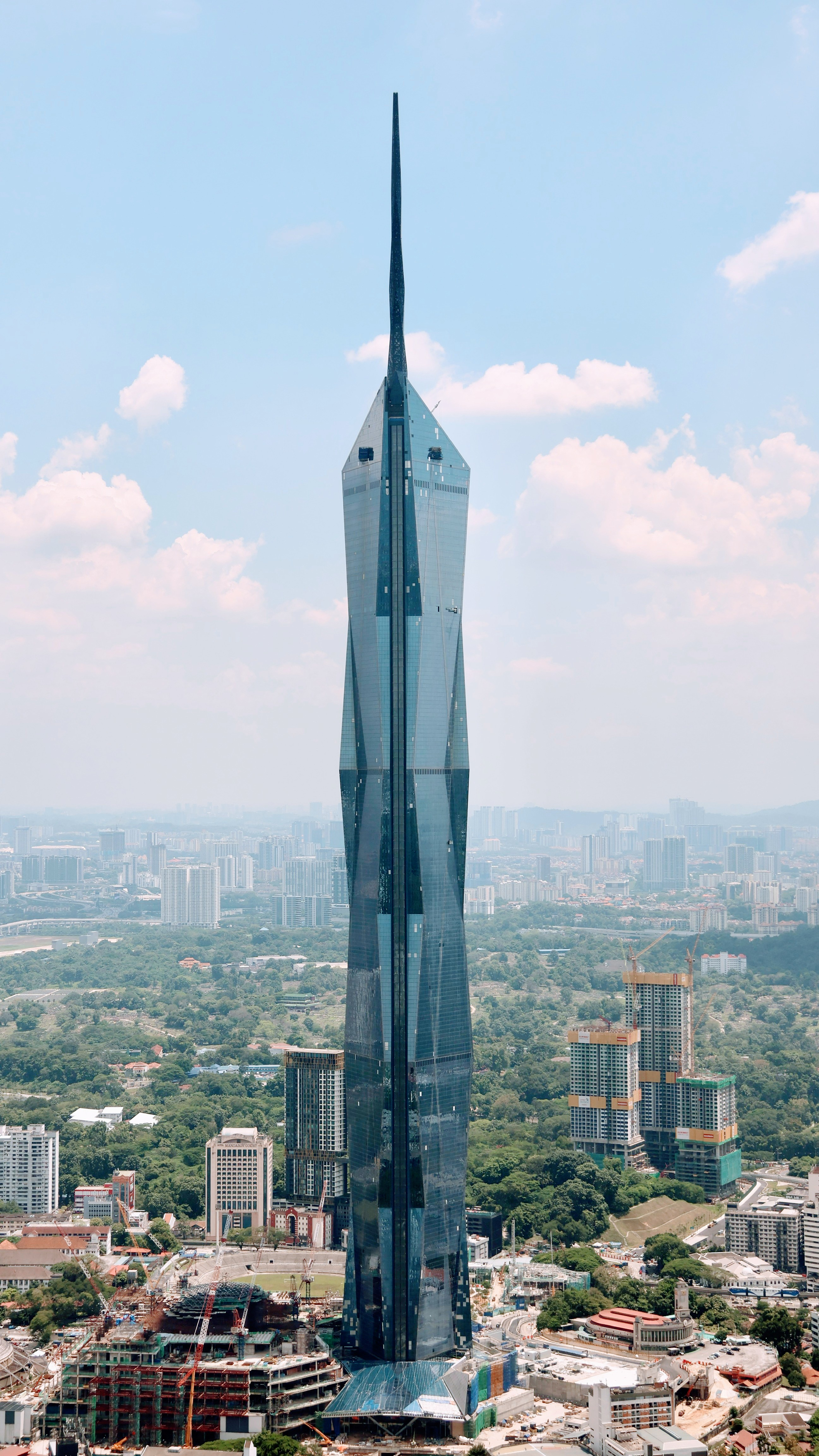
Merdeka 118, Kuala Lumpur, Malaysia

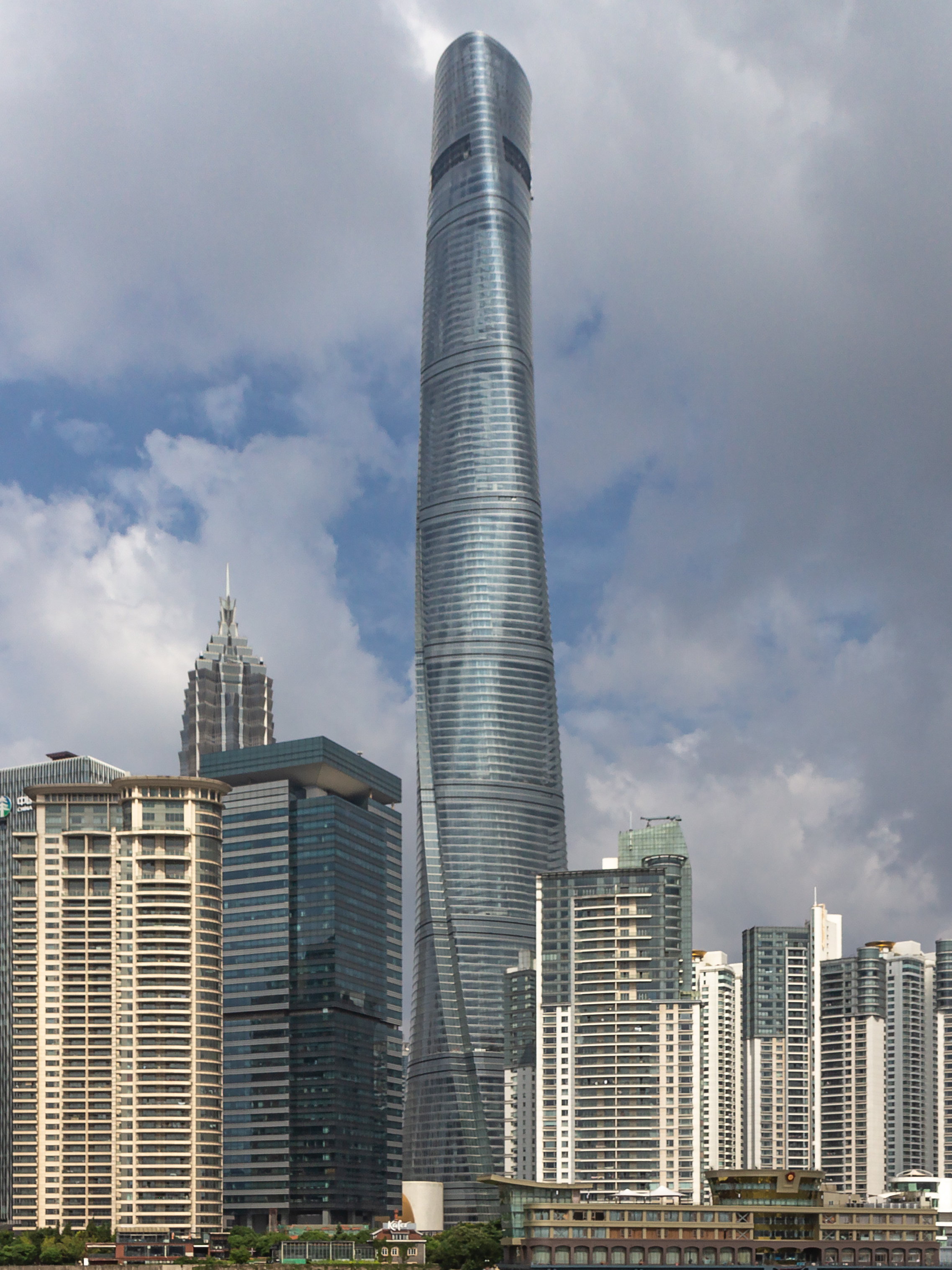
Shanghai Tower, Shanghai, China

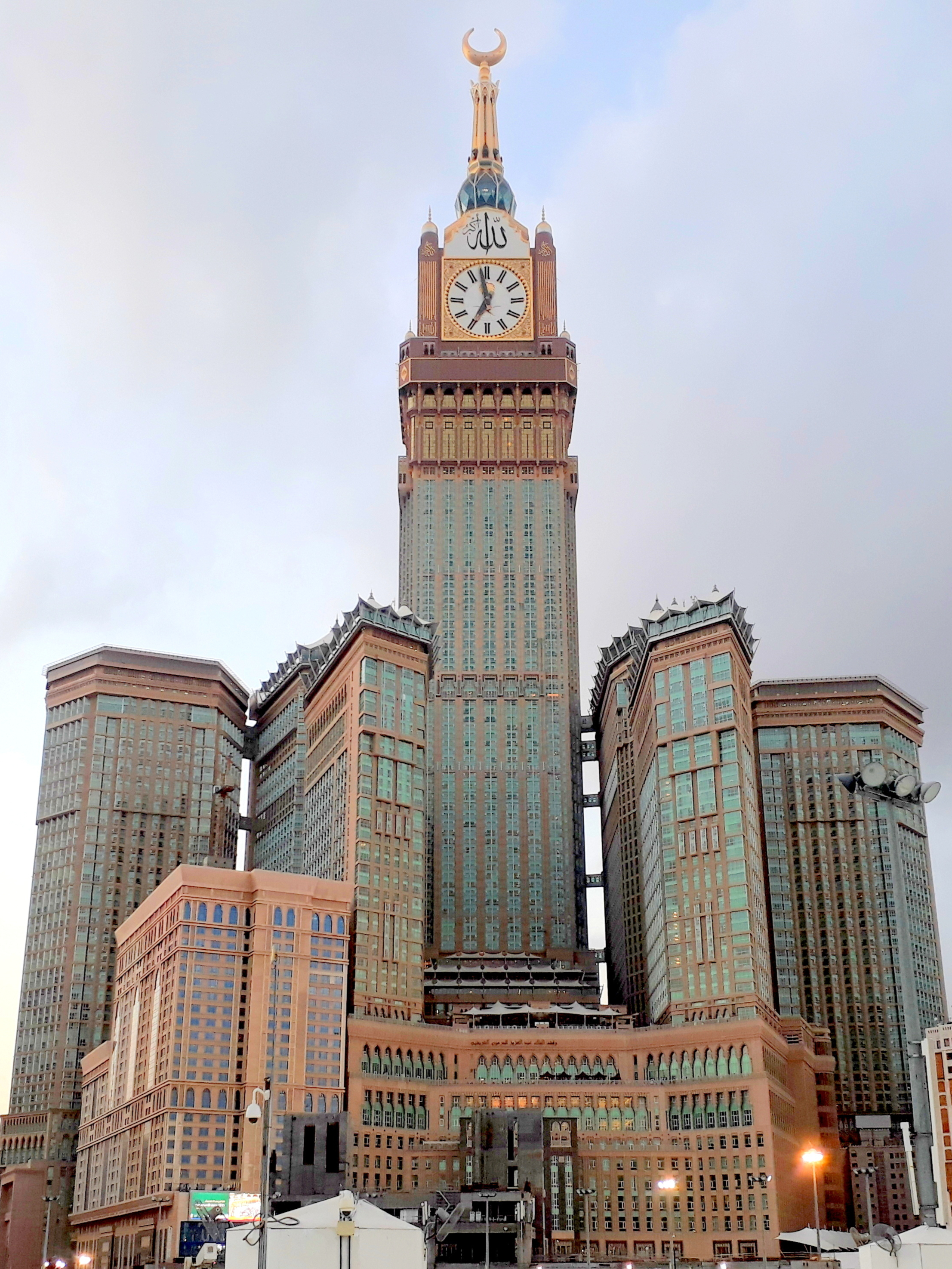
The Clock Towers in Mecca, Saudi Arabia

Lotte World Tower, Seoul, South Korea

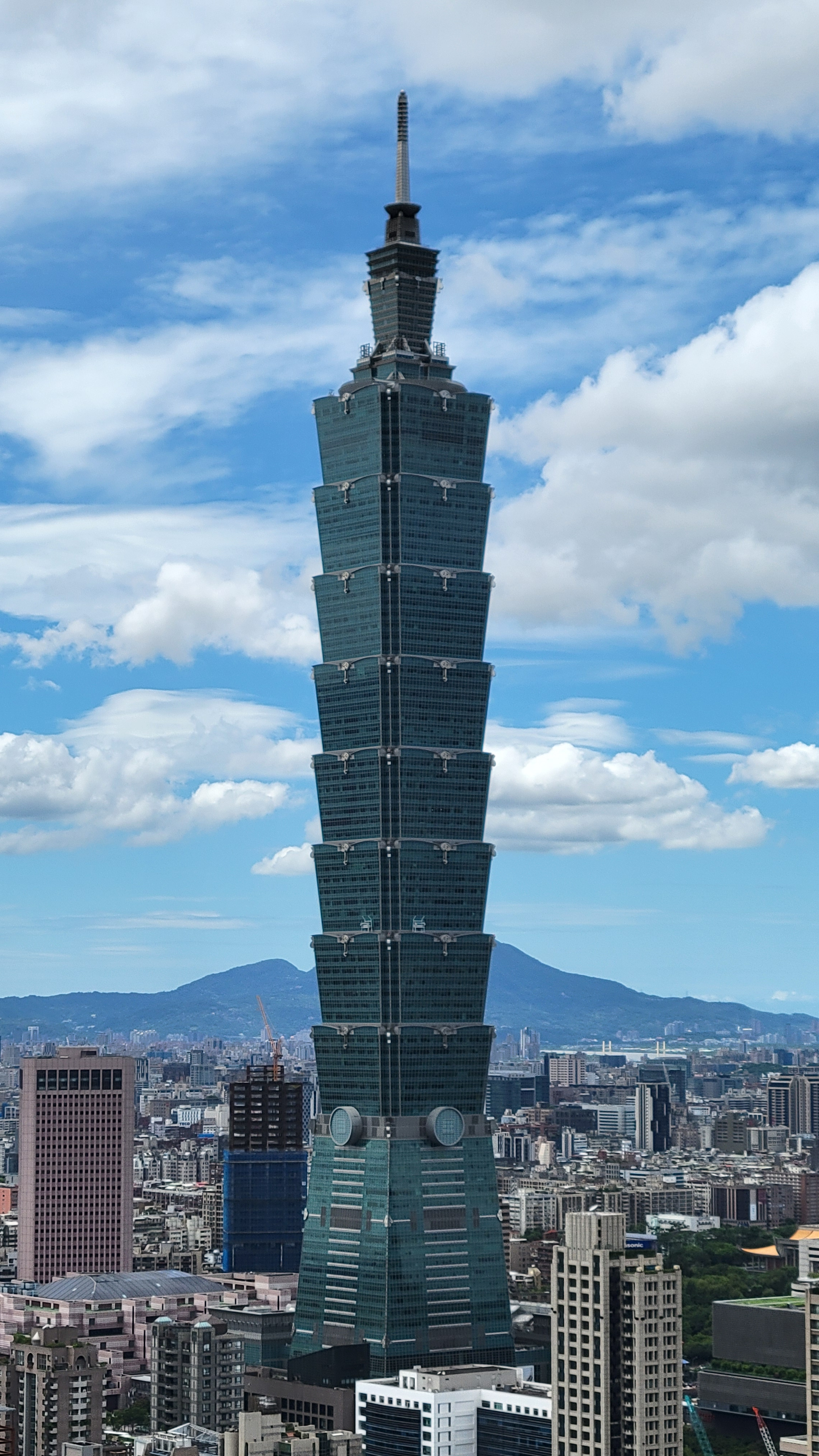
Taipei 101, Taipei, Taiwan

This list of tallest buildings in Asia ranks skyscrapers which are at least 275 m (902 ft) tall. The tallest building in Asia (and the tallest in the world) is Burj Khalifa, which stands 828 m (2,717 ft) and was opened on January 4, 2010, in Dubai, United Arab Emirates.

Nearly three-quarters of the 50 tallest skyscrapers in the world are located in Asia. Before the construction boom of skyscrapers in Asia since 1997, most of the tallest skyscrapers were built in North America. China has built fifteen of the tallest skyscrapers in the world in the last twenty years. The UAE has also built numerous skyscrapers in the last twenty years, and the city of Dubai has the most skyscrapers in the top fifty list.

The first list includes skyscrapers which are either completed or topped out according to CTBUH criteria. The second list includes those buildings which are proposed or under construction according to CTBUH criteria.

== Tallest buildings ==
This list ranks completed or topped out buildings in Asia that stand at least 275 m (902 ft) tall according to CTBUH criteria. Buildings that have been the tallest in Asia are shown in boldface.

Was the tallest building in Asia upon completion
Indicates the tallest buildings that have been architecturally topped out but not completed

Rank	Building^{[A]}	City	Country	Height (m)	Height (ft)	Floors	Built
1	**Burj Khalifa**	Dubai	UAE	828 m	2,717 ft	163	2010
2	Merdeka 118	Kuala Lumpur	Malaysia	678.9 m	2,227 ft	118	2023
3	Shanghai Tower	Shanghai	China	632 m	2,073 ft	128	2015
4	Mecca Royal Clock Tower	Mecca	Saudi Arabia	601 m	1,972 ft	120	2012
5	Ping An Finance Center	Shenzhen	China	599.1 m	1,966 ft	115	2017
6	Goldin Finance 117	Tianjin	China	596.6 m	1,957 ft	117	2027^{[B]}
7	Lotte World Tower	Seoul	South Korea	554.5 m	1,819 ft	123	2017
8 =	Guangzhou CTF Finance Centre	Guangzhou	China	530 m	1,739 ft	111	2016
8 =	Tianjin CTF Finance Centre	Tianjin	China	530 m	1,739 ft	97	2019
10	CITIC Tower	Beijing	China	527.7 m	1,731 ft	109	2018
11	**Taipei 101**	Taipei	Taiwan	508 m	1,667 ft	101	2004
12	Shanghai World Financial Center	Shanghai	China	492 m	1,614 ft	101	2008
13	International Commerce Centre	Hong Kong	Hong Kong	484 m	1,588 ft	108	2010
14	Wuhan Greenland Center	Wuhan	China	475.6 m	1,560 ft	101	2023
15	Landmark 81	Ho Chi Minh City	Vietnam	461.5 m	1,514 ft	81	2018
16	International Land-Sea Center	Chongqing	China	458.2 m	1,503 ft	98	2026^{[B]}
17	Changsha IFS Tower 1	Changsha	China	452.1 m	1,483 ft	94	2018
18 =	**Petronas Tower 1**	Kuala Lumpur	Malaysia	451.9 m	1,483 ft	88	1998
18 =	**Petronas Tower 2**	Kuala Lumpur	Malaysia	451.9 m	1,483 ft	88	1998
20 =	Suzhou IFS	Suzhou	China	450 m	1,476 ft	95	2019
20 =	Zifeng Tower	Nanjing	China	450 m	1,476 ft	89	2010
22	The Exchange 106	Kuala Lumpur	Malaysia	445.5 m	1,462 ft	95	2019
23	Wuhan Center Tower	Wuhan	China	443 m	1,454 ft	88	2019
24	KK100	Shenzhen	China	441.8 m	1,450 ft	98	2011
25	Guangzhou International Finance Center	Guangzhou	China	438.6 m	1,440 ft	101	2010
26	Greenland Shandong International Financial Center	Jinan	China	428 m	1,404 ft	88	2026^{[B]}
27	Marina 101	Dubai	UAE	425 m	1,394 ft	101	2017
28	Minying International Trade Center 2	Dongguan	China	423 m	1,386 ft	85	2021
29	Jin Mao Tower	Shanghai	China	420.5 m	1,380 ft	88	1999
30	Zijin Financial Building	Nanjing	China	417 m	1,367 ft	88	2025
31	Princess Tower	Dubai	UAE	413.4 m	1,356 ft	101	2012
32	Al Hamra Firdous Tower	Kuwait City	Kuwait	412.6 m	1,354 ft	80	2011
33	2 International Finance Centre	Hong Kong	Hong Kong	412 m	1,352 ft	88	2003
34	LCT The Sharp Landmark Tower	Busan	South Korea	411.6 m	1,350 ft	101	2019
35	Ningbo Central Plaza Tower 1	Ningbo	China	409 m	1,342 ft	80	2025
36	Guangxi China Resources Tower	Nanning	China	402.7 m	1,321 ft	86	2020
37	Guiyang International Financial Center Tower 1	Guiyang	China	401 m	1,316 ft	79	2020
38	China Merchants Bank Tower Global HQ	Shenzhen	China	393 m	1,289 ft	77	2025
39	China Resources Tower	Shenzhen	China	393 m	1,288 ft	68	2018
40	23 Marina	Dubai	UAE	392 m	1,287 ft	88	2012
41	CITIC Plaza	Guangzhou	China	391 m	1,283 ft	80	1997
42	Citymark Centre	Shenzhen	China	388 m	1,274 ft	70	2022
43	Shum Yip Upperhills Tower 1	Shenzhen	China	388 m	1,273 ft	80	2020
44	Public Investment Fund Tower	Riyadh	Saudi Arabia	385 m	1,263 ft	72	2021
45	Shun Hing Square	Shenzhen	China	384 m	1,260 ft	69	1996
46 =	Eton Place Dalian Tower 1	Dalian	China	383 m	1,257 ft	80	2016
46 =	Autograph Tower	Jakarta	Indonesia	383 m	1,257 ft	75	2022
48 =	Burj Mohammed Bin Rashid	Abu Dhabi	UAE	381 m	1,251 ft	88	2014
48 =	Elite Residence	Dubai	UAE	381 m	1,251 ft	87	2012
48 =	Nanning Logan Century 1	Nanning	China	381 m	1,251 ft	82	2018
51	Ciel Tower	Dubai	UAE	377 m	1,237 ft	82	2024
52	1 Corporate Avenue	Wuhan	China	376 m	1,234 ft	73	2021
53	Guangdong Business Center	Guangzhou	China	376 m	1,232 ft	60	2025
54	Dabaihui Plaza	Shenzhen	China	376 m	1,232 ft	70	2021
55	Central Plaza	Hong Kong	Hong Kong	374 m	1,227 ft	78	1992
56	Hengfeng Guiyang Center Tower 1	Guiyang	China	374 m	1,225 ft	77	2026^{[B]}
57	Dalian International Trade Center	Dalian	China	370 m	1,215 ft	86	2019
58	Address Boulevard	Dubai	UAE	370 m	1,213 ft	73	2017
59	Shanghai International Trade Center Tower 1	Shanghai	China	370 m	1,210 ft	67	2025
60	Haitian Center Tower 2	Qingdao	China	369 m	1,210 ft	73	2021
61	Golden Eagle Tiandi Tower A	Nanjing	China	368 m	1,208 ft	77	2019
62	Bank of China Tower	Hong Kong	Hong Kong	367 m	1,205 ft	70	1990
63	City Tower 1	Dubai	UAE	363 m	1,190 ft	94	2026
64 =	Almas Tower	Dubai	UAE	360 m	1,181 ft	68	2009
64 =	Ping An Finance Jinan Center	Jinan	China	360 m	1,181 ft	62	2023
66	Huiyun Center	Shenzhen	China	359 m	1,178 ft	80	2023
67	Hanking Center	Shenzhen	China	359 m	1,177 ft	65	2018
68	Greenland Group Suzhou Center	Suzhou	China	358 m	1,175 ft	77	2026^{[B]}
69	Gevora Hotel	Dubai	UAE	356 m	1,169 ft	75	2018
70	Il Primo Tower	Dubai	UAE	356 m	1,168 ft	79	2023
71	Galaxy World Tower 1	Shenzhen	China	356 m	1,168 ft	71	2023
72	Galaxy World Tower 2	Shenzhen	China	356 m	1,168 ft	71	2023
73 =	JW Marriott Marquis Dubai Tower 1	Dubai	UAE	355 m	1,164 ft	82	2012
73 =	JW Marriott Marquis Dubai Tower 2	Dubai	UAE	355 m	1,164 ft	82	2013
75 =	Raffles City Chongqing Tower 3N	Chongqing	China	355 m	1,163 ft	79	2019
75 =	Raffles City Chongqing Tower 4N	Chongqing	China	355 m	1,163 ft	74	2019
75 =	Emirates Office Tower	Dubai	UAE	355 m	1,163 ft	54	2000
78	CBRT Tower	Istanbul	Turkey	354 m	1,161 ft	62	2024
79	Wynn Al Marjan Island	Ras Al Khaimah	UAE	352 m	1,155 ft	75	2027^{[B]}
80	The Marina Torch	Dubai	UAE	352 m	1,155 ft	86	2011
81	Forum 66	Shenyang	China	351 m	1,150 ft	68	2015
82	The Pinnacle	Guangzhou	China	350 m	1,149 ft	60	2011
83	Xi'an Glory International Financial Center	Xi'an	China	350 m	1,148 ft	75	2022
84	Spring City 66	Kunming	China	349 m	1,145 ft	61	2020
85	85 Sky Tower	Kaohsiung	Taiwan	348 m	1,241 ft	85	1997
86	The Center	Hong Kong	Hong Kong	346 m	1,135 ft	73	1998
87	Al Habtoor City Tower	Dubai	UAE	345 m	1,132 ft	81	2027^{[B]}
88	Xiamen International Center	Xiamen	China	344 m	1,128 ft	68	2025
89	Shimao Global Financial Center	Changsha	China	343 m	1,125 ft	74	2019
90	Four Seasons Place Kuala Lumpur	Kuala Lumpur	Malaysia	343 m	1,124 ft	74	2018
91	ADNOC Headquarters	Abu Dhabi	UAE	342 m	1,122 ft	65	2015
92	One Shenzhen Bay Tower 7	Shenzhen	China	341 m	1,120 ft	71	2018
93 =	Mercedes Benz Places Binghatti	Dubai	UAE	341 m	1,119 ft	72	2027^{[B]}
93 =	Uptown Tower	Dubai	UAE	340 m	1,115 ft	78	2023
95 =	LCT The Sharp Residential Tower A	Busan	South Korea	339 m	1,112 ft	85	2019
95 =	Chongqing World Financial Center	Chongqing	China	339 m	1,112 ft	72	2015
95 =	Yun Ding Tower	Jinan	China	339 m	1,112 ft	69	2020
95 =	Wuxi IFS	Wuxi	China	339 m	1,112 ft	68	2014
95 =	Hilton Wenzhou City Center	Wenzhou	China	339 m	1,112 ft	71	2024
100	SO/ Sofitel Residences	Kuala Lumpur	Malaysia	339 m	1,112 ft	84	2025
101 =	Suning Plaza, Zhenjiang	Zhenjiang	China	338 m	1,109 ft	75	2018
101 =	Hengqin International Finance Center	Zhuhai	China	338 m	1,109 ft	69	2020
101 =	Tianjin Modern City Office Tower	Tianjin	China	338 m	1,109 ft	65	2016
104	Tianjin World Financial Center	Tianjin	China	337 m	1,105 ft	79	2010
105	SLS Dubai Hotel & Residences	Dubai	UAE	336 m	1,102 ft	78	2020
106 =	DAMAC Residenze	Dubai	UAE	335 m	1,099 ft	88	2018
106 =	Twin Towers Guiyang, East Tower	Guiyang	China	335 m	1,099 ft	74	2020
106 =	Twin Towers Guiyang, West Tower	Guiyang	China	335 m	1,099 ft	74	2020
109	AMA Tower	Dubai	UAE	334 m	1,093 ft	65	2021
110	Shengjing Finance Plaza T2	Guiyang	China	334 m	1,097 ft	68	2026^{[B]}
111 =	LCT The Sharp Residential Tower B	Busan	South Korea	333 m	1,194 ft	85	2019
111 =	Parc1 Tower I	Seoul	South Korea	333 m	1,194 ft	69	2020
111 =	Shimao International Plaza	Shanghai	China	333 m	1,094 ft	61	2006
111 =	Shenzhen Urban Construction & Tower	Shenzhen	China	333 m	1,093 ft	72	2024
111 =	Rose Rayhaan by Rotana	Dubai	UAE	333 m	1,093 ft	71	2007
116 =	The Address Residence - Fountain View III	Dubai	UAE	331 m	1,086 ft	77	2019
116 =	Regalia	Dubai	UAE	331 m	1,086 ft	70	2026
116 =	Minsheng Bank Building	Wuhan	China	331 m	1,086 ft	71	2008
119 =	Ryugyong Hotel	Pyongyang	North Korea	330 m	1,083 ft	105	1992^{[C]}
119 =	One Za'abeel Tower 1	Dubai	UAE	330 m	1,083 ft	67	2023
119 =	China World Trade Center Tower III	Beijing	China	330 m	1,083 ft	74	2010
119 =	Yuexiu Global Financial Center	Wuhan	China	330 m	1,083 ft	68	2025
119 =	Guangxi Financial Investment Center	Nanning	China	330 m	1,083 ft	70	2021
119 =	Golden Corridor 22-1 Project	Shenyang	China	330 m	1,083 ft	71	2026^{[B]}
119 =	Jiulong Lake Knowledge Tower	Guangzhou	China	330 m	1,083 ft	56	2026
119 =	Yuexiu Fortune Center Tower 1	Wuhan	China	330 m	1,083 ft	68	2017
119 =	Wuhan Yangtze River Shipping Tower 1	Wuhan	China	330 m	1,083 ft	65	2023
128	Hon Kwok City Center	Shenzhen	China	329 m	1,081 ft	80	2017
129	Zhuhai Tower	Zhuhai	China	329 m	1,079 ft	67	2017
130 =	Qingdao Landmark Tower 1	Qingdao	China	329 m	1,078 ft	71	2026^{[B]}
130 =	Keangnam Hanoi Landmark Tower	Hanoi	Vietnam	329 m	1,078 ft	72	2012
132 =	The Index	Dubai	UAE	328 m	1,076 ft	80	2010
132 =	Longxi International Hotel	Wuxi	China	328 m	1,076 ft	72	2011
132 =	Shenyang International Center Tower 2	Shenyang	China	328 m	1,076 ft	80	2027^{[B]}
132 =	Al Yaqoub Tower	Dubai	UAE	328 m	1,076 ft	69	2013
132 =	Suning Plaza, Wuxi	Wuxi	China	328 m	1,076 ft	67	2014
132 =	Golden Eagle Tiandi Tower B	Nanjing	China	328 m	1,076 ft	60	2019
138	Baoneng Center	Shenzhen	China	327 m	1,074 ft	65	2018
139 =	Huaqiang Golden Corridor City Plaza Main Tower	Shenyang	China	327 m	1,073 ft	66	2023
139 =	Xiangjiang Fortune Finance Center Tower 1	Changsha	China	327 m	1,073 ft	65	2020
141	Nanjing World Trade Center Tower 1	Nanjing	China	327 m	1,071 ft	68	2022
142	CITIC Pacific Plaza	Jinan	China	326 m	1,070 ft	64	2026^{[B]}
143	Azabudai Hills Main Tower	Tokyo	Japan	325 m	1,067 ft	64	2023
144 =	Deji Plaza II	Nanjing	China	324 m	1,063 ft	70	2014
144 =	The Landmark	Abu Dhabi	UAE	324 m	1,063 ft	72	2012
146 =	Mr. C Residences Downtown	Dubai	UAE	323 m	1,060 ft	72	2026^{[B]}
146 =	Yantai Shimao No.1 The Harbour	Yantai	China	323 m	1,060 ft	59	2017
148 =	Wenzhou World Trade Center	Wenzhou	China	322 m	1,056 ft	68	2011
149 =	Guangxi Finance Plaza	Nanning	China	321 m	1,053 ft	68	2017
149 =	Heartland 66 Office Tower	Wuhan	China	321 m	1,053 ft	61	2020
149 =	Burj Al Arab	Dubai	UAE	321 m	1,053 ft	56	1999
152	Palais Royale Mumbai	Mumbai	India	320 m	1,051 ft	88	2026^{[B]}
153	Nina Tower	Hong Kong	Hong Kong	320 m	1,051 ft	80	2007
154 =	Huijin Center 1	Guangzhou	China	320 m	1,050 ft	69	2022
154 =	Junchao Plaza	Guangzhou	China	320 m	1,050 ft	67	2025
154 =	Zhangjing Science Gate Tower 1	Shanghai	China	320 m	1,051 ft	60	2024
154 =	Zhangjing Science Gate Tower 2	Shanghai	China	320 m	1,051 ft	60	2024
154 =	Beibin Lu Main Tower	Chongqing	China	320 m	1,050 ft	71	2024
154 =	Guangzhou International Cultural Center	Guangzhou	China	320 m	1,050 ft	56	2026^{[B]}
154 =	White Magnolia Plaza	Shanghai	China	320 m	1,050 ft	65	2017
161	Global City Plaza	Guangzhou	China	319 m	1,047 ft	67	2016
162 =	China Resources Metropolitan City Center Landmark Tower	Wenzhou	China	318 m	1,044 ft	60	2025
162 =	Meixi Lake Changsha Jinmao Building	Changsha	China	318 m	1,044 ft	62	2024
162 =	Metrobank Center	Taguig, Manila	Philippines	318 m	1,043 ft	66	2016
162 =	Jiuzhou International Tower	Nanning	China	318 m	1,043 ft	71	2017
162 =	Kunming Xishan Wanda Plaza North	Kunming	China	318 m	1,043 ft	67	2016
162 =	Kunming Xishan Wanda Plaza South	Kunming	China	318 m	1,043 ft	66	2016
162 =	Xinchu Qingtian Plaza Tower 2	Changsha	China	318 m	1,043 ft	62	2023
169	HHHR Tower	Dubai	UAE	318 m	1,042 ft	72	2010
170	Hong Plaza Main Tower	Jinan	China	317 m	1,040 ft	62	2026^{[B]}
171	Chongqing IFS Tower 1	Chongqing	China	316 m	1,038 ft	63	2016
172 =	Magnolias Waterfront Residences	Bangkok	Thailand	315 m	1,033 ft	70	2018
172 =	International Youth Cultural Center Tower 1	Nanjing	China	315 m	1,033 ft	67	2015
174	King Power MahaNakhon	Bangkok	Thailand	314 m	1,030 ft	78	2016
175 =	Honglou Times Square	Lanzhou	China	313 m	1,027 ft	56	2018
175 =	TEDA IFC 1	Tianjin	China	313 m	1,027 ft	56	2026^{[B]}
177	Shenzhen Bay Innovation and Technology Centre Tower 1	Shenzhen	China	311 m	1,021 ft	69	2020
178 =	Moi Center	Shenyang	China	311 m	1,020 ft	75	2014
178 =	Abu Dhabi Plaza	Astana	Kazakhstan	311 m	1,020 ft	75	2022
178 =	Guangxi Wealth Financial Center	Nanning	China	311 m	1,020 ft	70	2019
178 =	Guangzhou Poly International Plaza	Guangzhou	China	311 m	1,020 ft	65	2017
182 =	Hengyu Jinrong Center Block A	Shenzhen	China	310 m	1,017 ft	66	2026^{[B]}
182 =	Ocean Heights	Dubai	UAE	310 m	1,017 ft	83	2010
182 =	Telekom Tower	Kuala Lumpur	Malaysia	310 m	1,017 ft	55	2001
185	CCCC Southern Financial Investment Building	Zhuhai	China	310 m	1,015 ft	65	2021
186 =	Pearl River Tower	Guangzhou	China	309 m	1,015 ft	71	2013
186 =	Fortune Center	Guangzhou	China	309 m	1,015 ft	68	2015
188	Jumeirah Emirates Towers Hotel	Dubai	UAE	309 m	1,014 ft	54	2000
189 =	Burj Rafal	Riyadh	Saudi Arabia	308 m	1,010 ft	68	2014
189 =	Changsha IFS Tower 2	Changsha	China	308 m	1,010 ft	63	2018
189 =	Beyond Office Tower	Givatayim	Israel	308 m	1,010 ft	72	2026^{[B]}
189 =	GF Securities Tower	Guangzhou	China	308 m	1,010 ft	58	2018
189 =	Nanshan Science and Technology Union Building	Shenzhen	China	307 m	1,008 ft	67	2026^{[B]}
194 =	Amna Tower	Dubai	UAE	307 m	1,007 ft	75	2020
194 =	Noora Tower	Dubai	UAE	307 m	1,007 ft	75	2019
194 =	Zhongtian Future Ark Global Valley Tower 5	Guiyang	China	306 m	1,005 ft	62	2027^{[B]}
197 =	East Pacific Center Tower A	Shenzhen	China	306 m	1,004 ft	85	2013
197 =	Cayan Tower	Dubai	UAE	306 m	1,004 ft	73	2013
199	Etihad Tower 2	Abu Dhabi	UAE	305 m	1,002 ft	80	2011
200 =	Posco Tower-Songdo	Incheon	South Korea	305 m	1,001 ft	68	2010
200 =	Zhongshan International Trade Center	Zhongshan	China	305 m	1,001 ft	65	2019
202 =	Baiyoke Tower II	Bangkok	Thailand	304 m	997 ft	85	1997
202 =	Wuxi Maoye City – Marriott Hotel	Wuxi	China	304 m	997 ft	68	2014
202 =	KAFD World Trade Center	Riyadh	Saudi Arabia	304 m	997 ft	67	2022
202 =	Greenland Hangzhou Center South Tower	Hangzhou	China	304 m	997 ft	64	2023
202 =	Greenland Hangzhou Center North Tower	Hangzhou	China	303 m	995 ft	64	2023
207 =	Guangdong Landmark Building	Shenzhen	China	303 m	995 ft	62	2023
207 =	Suzhou ICC	Suzhou	China	303 m	995 ft	68	2025
209 =	Diwang International Fortune Center	Liuzhou	China	303 m	994 ft	75	2015
209 =	Greenland Puli Center	Jinan	China	303 m	994 ft	63	2015
209 =	Jiangxi Nanchang Greenland Central Plaza 1	Nanchang	China	303 m	994 ft	59	2015
209 =	Jiangxi Nanchang Greenland Central Plaza 2	Nanchang	China	303 m	994 ft	59	2015
213	Leatop Plaza	Guangzhou	China	303 m	993 ft	64	2012
214 =	Address Downtown	Dubai	UAE	302 m	991 ft	63	2008
214 =	Kingdom Centre	Riyadh	Saudi Arabia	302 m	991 ft	41	2002
216 =	Gate of the Orient	Suzhou	China	302 m	990 ft	68	2015
216 =	The Assima Tower	Kuwait City	Kuwait	302 m	990 ft	65	2023
218 =	We've the Zenith Tower A	Busan	South Korea	301 m	988 ft	80	2011
218 =	Lokhandwala Minerva	Mumbai	India	301 m	982 ft	78	2023
218 =	The Address Beach Resort	Dubai	UAE	301 m	988 ft	77	2020
218 =	Al Wasl Tower	Dubai	UAE	301 m	988 ft	64	2024
218 =	Chongqing International Commerce Financial Centre Tower 1	Chongqing	China	301 m	988 ft	65	2022
218 =	Luminary Tower	Jakarta	Indonesia	301 m	988 ft	64	2023
224	Zhongzhou Holdings Financial Center	Shenzhen	China	301 m	987 ft	61	2015
225 =	Lusail Plaza Tower 3	Lusail	Qatar	301 m	986 ft	64	2023
225 =	Lusail Plaza Tower 4	Lusail	Qatar	301 m	986 ft	64	2023
227 =	Huachuang International Plaza	Changsha	China	300 m	984 ft	66	2017
227 =	Greenland Bund Centre Tower 1	Shanghai	China	300 m	984 ft	64	2025
227 =	NBK Tower	Kuwait City	Kuwait	300 m	984 ft	61	2019
227 =	Arraya Tower	Kuwait City	Kuwait	300 m	984 ft	60	2009
227 =	Abeno Harukas	Osaka	Japan	300 m	984 ft	60	2014
227 =	OCT Tower	Shenzhen	China	300 m	984 ft	60	2020
227 =	Jiefangbei Book City	Chongqing	China	300 m	984 ft	63	2025
227 =	Golden Eagle Tiandi Tower C	Nanjing	China	300 m	984 ft	58	2019
227 =	Yangzhou Keyne Center	Yangzhou	China	300 m	984 ft	60	2026^{[B]}
227 =	Shenglong Global Center	Fuzhou	China	300 m	984 ft	57	2019
227 =	Aspire Tower	Doha	Qatar	300 m	984 ft	36	2007
227 =	Jin Wan Plaza 9	Tianjin	China	299.7 m	983 ft	66	2017
239 =	Four Season Private Residences Bangkok	Bangkok	Thailand	299.5 m	983 ft	73	2019
239 =	Yujiapu Yinglan International Finance Center	Tianjin	China	299.5 m	983 ft	63	2026^{[B]}
241 =	Shum Yip Upperhills Tower 2	Shenzhen	China	299.3 m	982 ft	62	2020
241 =	Totzeret HaAretz Tower 2	Tel Aviv	Israel	298.2 m	978 ft	76	2026^{[B]}
243	One Island East	Hong Kong	Hong Kong	298.1 m	978 ft	68	2008
244 =	Shengjing Finance Plaza T1	Guiyang	China	298 m	978 ft	61	2026^{[B]}
245	Tianjin Universe World	Tianjin	China	297 m	974 ft	50	2026^{[B]}
246	R&F Yingkai Square	Guangzhou	China	296 m	972 ft	66	2014
247	Emirates Crown	Dubai	UAE	296 m	971 ft	63	2008
248 =	Yokohama Landmark Tower	Yokohama	Japan	296 m	970 ft	70	1993
248 =	China World Trade Center Tower III B	Beijing	China	296 m	970 ft	70	2017
250	Forte Towers 1	Dubai	UAE	295 m	969 ft	72	2023
251	Shimao Cross-Strait Plaza A	Xiamen	China	295 m	968 ft	64	2015
252	Shimao Qianhai Center	Shenzhen	China	294 m	966 ft	62	2020
253	Khalid Al Attar Tower 2	Dubai	UAE	294 m	965 ft	66	2011
254 =	Riverfront Times Square	Shenzhen	China	293 m	961 ft	64	2016
254 =	Hangzhou Centre Tower A	Hangzhou	China	293 m	961 ft	63	2021
254 =	Qianhai Horoy Tower	Shenzhen	China	293 m	961 ft	62	2022
257	Sky Tower	Abu Dhabi	UAE	292 m	959 ft	74	2010
258	Haeundae I'Park Marina Tower 2	Busan	South Korea	292 m	958 ft	72	2011
259	SEG Plaza	Shenzhen	China	292 m	957 ft	71	2000
260	China Resources Qianhai Center 1	Shenzhen	China	292 m	956 ft	65	2021
261 =	C Future City East Tower	Shenzhen	China	291 m	954 ft	62	2022
261 =	C Future City West Tower	Shenzhen	China	291 m	954 ft	62	2022
263	Qianhai International Hub Tower 4	Shenzhen	China	291 m	953 ft	61	2026^{[B]}
264 =	Concord International Centre	Chongqing	China	290 m	951 ft	64	2017
264 =	Powerlong Center Tower 1	Tianjin	China	290 m	951 ft	59	2019
266 =	Dongguan TBA Tower	Dongguan	China	289 m	948 ft	68	2013
266 =	Busan International Finance Center	Busan	South Korea	289 m	948 ft	63	2014
268	China Chuneng Tower	Shenzhen	China	289 m	947 ft	62	2016
269 =	Sulafa Tower	Dubai	UAE	288 m	945 ft	75	2010
269 =	Opera Grand	Dubai	UAE	288 m	945 ft	71	2021
269 =	Plaza 66	Shanghai	China	288 m	945 ft	66	2001
269 =	Kaisa Center	Huizhou	China	288 m	945 ft	66	2015
269 =	Free Trade Times Square	Haikou	China	288 m	945 ft	60	2022
269 =	Nanjing Two IFC	Nanjing	China	288 m	945 ft	60	2021
269 =	Yingli Tower	Chongqing	China	288 m	945 ft	58	2017
269 =	Shaoxing Shimao Crowne Plaza	Shaoxing	China	288 m	945 ft	55	2012
269 =	Soochow International Plaza East Tower	Huzhou	China	288 m	945 ft	50	2014
269 =	Soochow International Plaza West Tower	Huzhou	China	288 m	945 ft	50	2014
269 =	Gama Tower	Jakarta	Indonesia	288 m	938 ft	64	2015
269 =	Azure Tower	Jakarta	Indonesia	288 m	938 ft	77	2024
281 =	United International Mansion	Chongqing	China	287 m	942 ft	67	2013
281 =	Chongqing Poly Tower	Chongqing	China	287 m	942 ft	61	2013
283 =	Huaxun Center	Shenzhen	China	286 m	938 ft	70	2018
283 =	Kunming Rainbow Yunnan First City Tower 1	Kunming	China	286 m	938 ft	56	2022
283 =	Wenling Sheraton	Wenling	China	286 m	938 ft	54	2026^{[B]}
283 =	Ping An Finance Center South	Shenzhen	China	286 m	938 ft	51	2019
287 =	Lumina Shanghai	Shanghai	China	285 m	935 ft	61	2021
287 =	Millennium Tower	Dubai	UAE	285 m	935 ft	60	2006
287 =	Palm Beach Towers 3	Dubai	UAE	285 m	935 ft	61	2026^{[B]}
290 =	Tomorrow Square	Shanghai	China	285 m	934 ft	55	2003
290 =	Zhenru Center	Shanghai	China	285 m	934 ft	53	2022
292 =	Tiantou International Business Center 1	Chengdu	China	284 m	932 ft	59	2021
292 =	Three IFC Office Tower	Seoul	South Korea	284 m	932 ft	55	2012
294 =	Guoco Tower	Singapore	Singapore	284 m	931 ft	65	2016
294 =	Greenland Zhengzhou Central Plaza South Tower	Zhengzhou	China	284 m	931 ft	63	2017
294 =	Greenland Zhengzhou Central Plaza North Tower	Zhengzhou	China	284 m	931 ft	63	2017
294 =	One Excellence Tower 1	Shenzhen	China	284 m	931 ft	62	2019
294 =	Yuehai Finance Center Tower 1	Guangzhou	China	284 m	931 ft	59	2022
299 =	Piramal Aranya Arav	Mumbai	India	283 m	929 ft	83	2023
300 =	The Address Residence - Fountain Views I	Dubai	UAE	283 m	929 ft	70	2018
300 =	Chongqing World Trade Center	Chongqing	China	283 m	929 ft	60	2005
302 =	Cheung Kong Centre	Hong Kong	Hong Kong	283 m	928 ft	63	1999
302 =	GT Land Landmark Plaza South Tower	Guangzhou	China	283 m	928 ft	47	2016
304	The Address Residence - Fountain Views II	Dubai	UAE	283 m	927 ft	70	2018
305 =	We've the Zenith Tower B	Busan	South Korea	282 m	926 ft	75	2011
305 =	City of Lights C1 Tower	Abu Dhabi	UAE	282 m	926 ft	62	2015
305 =	ICD Brookfield Place	Dubai	UAE	282 m	926 ft	54	2020
305 =	Global 188	Suzhou	China	282 m	926 ft	49	2010
309	Al Hekma Tower	Dubai	UAE	282 m	925 ft	64	2015
310	Lanzhou City Square	Lanzhou	China	281 m	922 ft	60	2018
311 =	Taipei Sky Tower	Taipei	Taiwan	280 m	919 ft	56	2025
311 =	Boulevard Point	Dubai	UAE	280 m	919 ft	69	2020
311 =	World One	Mumbai	India	280 m	919 ft	76	2020
311 =	Metropol Istanbul	Istanbul	Turkey	280 m	919 ft	70	2018
311 =	Marina Pinnacle	Dubai	UAE	280 m	919 ft	73	2011
311 =	United Overseas Bank Plaza One	Singapore	Singapore	280 m	919 ft	66	1995
311 =	Hefei China Resources Center	Hefei	China	280 m	919 ft	65	2017
311 =	Five Jumeirah Village Dubai	Dubai	UAE	280 m	919 ft	61	2019
311 =	Excellence Century Plaza Tower 1	Shenzhen	China	280 m	919 ft	60	2010
311 =	International Commerce Center Tower 1	Chengdu	China	280 m	919 ft	60	2022
311 =	Millennium Royal Plaza	Zhengzhou	China	280 m	919 ft	56	2014
311 =	Qiantan Center	Shanghai	China	280 m	919 ft	56	2020
311 =	Hangzhou Wangchao Center	Hangzhou	China	280 m	919 ft	54	2023
311 =	CapitaSpring	Singapore	Singapore	280 m	919 ft	51	2021
311 =	Star River Center	Guangzhou	China	280 m	919 ft	46	2022
326	Bodi Center Tower C	Hangzhou	China	280 m	918 ft	57	2017
327 =	Eton Place Dalian Tower 2	Dalian	China	280 m	917 ft	62	2015
327 =	Treasury Tower	Jakarta	Indonesia	280 m	917 ft	57	2018
329 =	Bodi Center Tower C	Hangzhou	China	279 m	916 ft	57	2017
330 =	Shimao Hangzhou Twin Tower A	Hangzhou	China	279 m	916 ft	61	2022
330 =	[Shimao Hangzhou Twin Tower B	Hangzhou	China	279 m	916 ft	61	2022
332 =	The Astaka Tower A	Johor Bahru	Malaysia	279 m	915 ft	72	2018
332 =	Abraj Al Bait ZamZam Tower	Mecca	Saudi Arabia	279 m	915 ft	58	2012
332 =	Grande Signature Residences	Dubai	UAE	279 m	915 ft	76	2023
335	K11	Shanghai	China	278 m	913 ft	59	2004
335 =	Logan International Headquarters Tower 1	Nanning	China	278 m	912 ft	58	2018
337 =	World View	Mumbai	India	278 m	911 ft	73	2020
338	D1	Dubai	UAE	278 m	911 ft	80	2015
339	Etihad Tower 1	Abu Dhabi	UAE	278 m	911 ft	69	2011
339 =	One Raffles Place	Singapore	Singapore	278 m	911 ft	63	1986
341	Trust Tower	Abu Dhabi	UAE	277 m	907 ft	60	2014
342 =	Republic Plaza	Singapore	Singapore	276 m	906 ft	66	1998
342 =	Guizhou Park Office Tower	Guiyang	China	276 m	906 ft	55	2019
342 =	Diwang International Commerce Center	Nanning	China	276 m	906 ft	54	2006
342 =	Abraj Al Bait Hajar Tower	Mecca	Saudi Arabia	276 m	906 ft	54	2012
342 =	Park Central North Tower	Makati	Philippines	276 m	906 ft	69	2025
342 =	One City Centre	Bangkok	Thailand	276 m	906 ft	61	2023
348	Tianyue Xinchen Tower 1	Wuhan	China	275 m	903 ft	43	2018
349 =	Riverside Century Plaza Main Tower	Wuhu	China	275 m	902 ft	66	2015
349 =	Shanghai SK Group Tower	Shanghai	China	275 m	902 ft	54	2019
349 =	Guiyang International Financial Center Tower 2	Guiyang	China	275 m	902 ft	54	2020

== Tallest under construction, on-hold, approved and proposed ==
Key
Building currently under construction
Building approved
Building proposed
Building stopped construction
Building site preparation of obsolete proposal on interruption of innovation she vision

=== Under construction, Approved or Proposed Asian skyscrapers ===
This section contains list of skyscrapers taller than 300 m (984 ft) under construction or proposed according to CTBUH criteria.

Rank	Building	Height (m/ft)	Floors	Planned completion	Country	City	Notes
1	Rise Tower	2,000 m (6,600 ft)	678	2050	Saudi Arabia	Riyadh	will become the tallest tower in the world in 2050.
2	Jeddah Tower	1,008 m (3,307 ft)	168	2029	Saudi Arabia	Jeddah	Will become the tallest man-made structure in the world, construction resume in January and February 2025.
3	Burj Mubarak Al Kabir	1,001 m (3,284 ft)	234	2040	Kuwait	Madinat al-Hareer	
4	Neom Wind Tower	1,000 m (3,300 ft)	n/a	2040	Saudi Arabia	Neom	
5	BUMN Tower	780 m (2,560 ft)	156	2045	Indonesia	Nusantara	
6	Caiwuwei Center	760 m (2,490 ft)	169	n/a	China	Shenzhen	
7	Burj Azizi	725 m (2,379 ft)	133	2030	UAE	Dubai	
8	Uptown Dubai Tower 1	711 m (2,333 ft)	146	2030	UAE	Dubai	
9	Tower M	700 m (2,300 ft)	145	2045	Malaysia	Kuala Lumpur	Tower M, formerly known as the KLCC East Gate Tower, is a proposed megatall skyscraper project in Kuala Lumpur, Malaysia situated within the Kuala Lumpur City Centre (KLCC)
10	King Salman Gate Tower 1	660 m (2,170 ft)	131	2032	Saudi Arabia	Mecca	
11 =	Avior Towers 1	650 m (2,130 ft)	136	2032	UAE	Dubai	
11 =	Avior Towers 2	650 m (2,130 ft)	136	2032	UAE	Dubai	
13	Shenzhen Tower	642 m (2,106 ft)	130	n/a	China	Shenzhen	
14	Signature Tower	638 m (2,093 ft)	113	2031	Indonesia	Jakarta	
15	Bandar Malaysia Landmark Tower	600 m (2,000 ft)	150	n/a	Malaysia	Kuala Lumpur	
16	Nexus Tower	595 m (1,952 ft)	124	n/a	China	Shenzhen	
17	Tashkent Twin City Towers 1	575 m (1,886 ft)	119	n/a	Uzbekistan	Tashkent	
18 =	Hanoi Twin Towers 99 Tower 1	569 m (1,867 ft)	99	2030	Vietnam	Hanoi	
18 =	Hanoi Twin Towers 99 Tower 2	569 m (1,867 ft)	99	2030	Vietnam	Hanoi	
18 =	Hyundai Global Business Center	569 m (1,867 ft)	105	2030	South Korea	Seoul	
21	Burj Binghatti Jacob & Co Residences	557 m (1,827 ft)	105	2027	UAE	Dubai	When tallest residential buildings in the world if completed after Central Park Tower.
22	Norea City Landmark Tower	555 m (1,821 ft)	135	2030	Cambodia	Phnom Penh	
23	Smart City Financial Tower	553 m (1,814 ft)	108	2028	Vietnam	Hanoi	
23 =	Makkasan Complex	550 m (1,800 ft)	120	n/a	Thailand	Bangkok	
25	Alpha Towers	545 m (1,788 ft)	110	n/a	UAE	Dubai	
26	Domino Tower	540 m (1,770 ft)	99	n/a	Vietnam	Ha Long Bay	
27	Tiger Sky Tower	532 m (1,745 ft)	116	2029	UAE	Dubai	
28	Lodha Project Wadala	530 m (1,740 ft)	101	n/a	India	Mumbai	
29	Guizhou Culture Plaza Tower	521 m (1,709 ft)	109	n/a	China	Guizhou	
30	Bursa Towers	520 m (1,710 ft)	120	n/a	Israel	Ramat Gan	
31	Jinan IFC Landmark Tower	518 m (1,699 ft)	135	n/a	China	Jinan	
32	Six Senses Residences Dubai Marina (Former: Pentominium)	517 m (1,696 ft)	122	2028	UAE	Dubai	
33	City Tower 2	509.8 m (1,673 ft)	119	2028	UAE	Dubai	
34	RP One Tower	504 m (1,654 ft)	112	2030	UAE	Dubai	
35	Corinthia Dubai	502 m (1,647 ft)	102	2030	UAE	Dubai	
36 =	1 Financial Trade Tower	500 m (1,600 ft)	110	n/a	Malaysia	Malacca	
36 =	Bandar Malaysia Iconic Tower	500 m (1,600 ft)	100	n/a	Malaysia	Kuala Lumpur	
36 =	Tengri Tower	500 m (1,600 ft)	100	n/a	Kazakhstan	Astana	
39	Greenland Jinmao International Financial Center	499.8 m (1,640 ft)	102	2028	China	Nanjing	
40	HeXi Yuzui Tower A	498.8 m (1,636 ft)	85	2028	China	Nanjing	
41	Sihanoukville Financial Center	496 m (1,627 ft)	106	n/a	Cambodia	Sihanoukville	
42	New Dubai Skylines Tower	490 m (1,610 ft)	124	n/a	UAE	Dubai	
43	Tianfu Center	489 m (1,604 ft)	95	2027	China	Chengdu	
44	Joyus Housing	486 m (1,594 ft)	125	n/a	India	Mumbai	
45	MGN Tower	485 m (1,591 ft)	85	n/a	Cambodia	Phnom Penh	
46	North Bund Tower	480 m (1,570 ft)	97	2030	China	Shanghai	
47	Wuhan CTF Finance Center	475 m (1,558 ft)	84	2029	China	Wuhan	
47 =	Legacy Tower	473 m (1,552 ft)	111	2028	Bangladesh	Dhaka	
49	Chengdu Greenland Tower	468 m (1,535 ft)	101	2029	China	Chengdu	
50	Suzhou CSC Fortune Center	460 m (1,510 ft)	100	2028	China	Suzhou	
51	Beomeo Station The King Penthouse & Shopping Mall Tower A	456 m (1,496 ft)	108	2030	South Korea	Daegu	
52 =	Aeternitas Tower (Marina 106)	450 m (1,480 ft)	106	2027	UAE	Dubai	
52 =	Bursa Triangle 1	450 m (1,480 ft)	95	n/a	Israel	Ramat Gan	
52 =	Asiatique Iconic Tower	450 m (1,480 ft)	100	2030	Thailand	Bangkok	
52 =	China Resources Land Center	450 m (1,480 ft)	98	2028	China	Dongguan	
52 =	Sobha Skyparks	450 m (1,480 ft)	109	2030	UAE	Dubai	
57	DWTN Residences	445 m (1,460 ft)	110	2030	UAE	Dubai	
58 =	Hirmas Tower	440 m (1,440 ft)	107	n/a	UAE	Dubai	
58 =	King Salman Gate Tower 2	440 m (1,440 ft)	92	2032	Saudi Arabia	Mecca	
60	Wuhan World Trade Center	438 m (1,437 ft)	86	n/a	China	Wuhan	
61	Sharjah H1 Tower	435 m (1,427 ft)	104	n/a	UAE	Sharjah	
62	Hainan Center Tower 1	428 m (1,404 ft)	94	2027	China	Haikou	
63	Songdo I-Core City	420 m (1,380 ft)	103	2030	South Korea	Incheon	
64	Tsingshan Holdings Group Global Headquarters Tower 1	418 m (1,371 ft)	n/a	n/a	China	Wenzhou	
65	Diamond Tower	410 m (1,350 ft)	86	2030	India	GIFT City	
66	Da Nang Downtown Tower	408 m (1,339 ft)	70	2030	Vietnam	Da Nang	
67	Shenzhen Luohu Friendship Trading Centre	407 m (1,335 ft)	83	2026	China	Shenzhen	
68	Core Towers 2	404 m (1,325 ft)	101	n/a	Israel	Ramat Gan	
69 =	Pollux Habibie Financial Center & International Hotel	400 m (1,300 ft)	100	2028	Indonesia	Batam	
69 =	Bein Arim Tower	400 m (1,300 ft)	100	2030	Israel	Tel Aviv	
69 =	Shreepati Garden Tower 1	400 m (1,300 ft)	110	n/a	India	Mumbai	
69 =	Shreepati Garden Tower 2	400 m (1,300 ft)	110	n/a	India	Mumbai	
69 =	Naza Signature Tower	400 m (1,300 ft)	100	n/a	Malaysia	Kuala Lumpur	
69 =	BBCC Signature Tower	400 m (1,300 ft)	88	2028	Malaysia	Kuala Lumpur	
69 =	Great River Center	400 m (1,300 ft)	82	2026	China	Wuhan	
69 =	Hangzhou West Railway Station Hub Tower 1	400 m (1,300 ft)	82	n/a	China	Hangzhou	
77	Shenzhen Bay Super Headquarters Based Tower C-1	400 m (1,300 ft)	78	2027	China	Shenzhen	
77 =	Mukaab	400 m (1,300 ft)	70	2040	Saudi Arabia	Riyadh	
77 =	Celestia Spaces 1	400 m (1,300 ft)	80	n/a	India	Mumbai	
77 =	Celestia Spaces 2	400 m (1,300 ft)	80	n/a	India	Mumbai	
77 =	Celestia Spaces 3	400 m (1,300 ft)	80	n/a	India	Mumbai	
77 =	Celestia Spaces 4	400 m (1,300 ft)	80	n/a	India	Mumbai	
77 =	Celestia Spaces 5	400 m (1,300 ft)	80	n/a	India	Mumbai	
77 =	Celestia Spaces 6	400 m (1,300 ft)	80	n/a	India	Mumbai	
77 =	Celestia Spaces 7	400 m (1,300 ft)	80	n/a	India	Mumbai	
77 =	Celestia Spaces 8	400 m (1,300 ft)	80	n/a	India	Mumbai	
87	Seoul Media Tower	397 m (1,302 ft)	90	n/a	South Korea	Seoul	
88	Imperial 3	396 m (1,299 ft)	116	2028	India	Mumbai	
89	China Merchants Group West Headquarters	396 m (1,299 ft)	82	2028	China	Chengdu	
90	Tashkent Twin City Towers 2	395 m (1,296 ft)	81	n/a	Uzbekistan	Tashkent	
91	Shenzhen Bay Super Headquarters Base Tower B	394.4 m (1,294 ft)	81	2028	China	Shenzhen	
92	Lucheng Square	388.8 m (1,276 ft)	79	2028	China	Wenzhou	
93 =	Golden Topper BGC Icon Tower	388 m (1,273 ft)	80	2029	Philippines	Taguig, Metro Manila	
94	Shenyang International Center Tower 1	388 m (1,273 ft)	75	2027	China	Shenyang	
94 =	Guohua Financial Center Tower 1	388 m (1,273 ft)	67	n/a	China	Wuhan	
96	SZR Tower	385 m (1,263 ft)	102	n/a	UAE	Dubai	
97	Torch Tower	385 m (1,263 ft)	62	2028	Japan	Tokyo	
98	Beomeo Station The King Penthouse and Shopping Mall Tower B	384 m (1,260 ft)	89	2030	South Korea	Daegu	
99 =	Jewel I-City	381 m (1,250 ft)	79	2030	Malaysia	Shah Alam	
99 =	Kuala Lumpur Signature Tower	381.0 m (1,250 ft)	n/a	n/a	Malaysia	Kuala Lumpur	
101 =	North Bund Tower 2	380 m (1,250 ft)	n/a	n/a	China	Shanghai	
101 =	Core Towers 1	380 m (1,250 ft)	95	n/a	Israel	Ramat Gan	
101 =	First Iraq Tower	380 m (1,250 ft)	80	2028	Iraq	Baghdad	
101 =	Lumena Alta by Omniyat	380 m (1,250 ft)	72	2029	UAE	Dubai	
101 =	Muraba Veil	380 m (1,250 ft)	74	2029	UAE	Dubai	
106 =	Skyscape Altius at Sobha Hartland 2	374 m (1,227 ft)	91	2029	UAE	Dubai	
106 =	China Merchants Prince Bay Tower	374 m (1,227 ft)	59	2028	China	Shenzhen	
106 =	Christian A. Rockefeller Tower	372 m (1,220 ft)	88	n/a	UAE	Dubai	
109	CJ LiveCity Landmark Tower	370 m (1,210 ft)	88	n/a	South Korea	Goyang	
110 =	Taipei Twin Towers 1	369 m (1,211 ft)	74	2027	Taiwan	Taipei	
110 =	The Pinnacle at Sobha Central	369 m (1,211 ft)	99	2030	UAE	Dubai	
112	Ajyad Residences Tower	365 m (1,198 ft)	84	2031	Saudi Arabia	Mecca	
113	Core Towers 3	364 m (1,194 ft)	84	n/a	Israel	Ramat Gan	
114	Bayz 101 Tower	363 m (1,191 ft)	108	2028	UAE	Dubai	
115 =	Gateway Tower 2	362 m (1,188 ft)	70	2028	India	GIFT City	
115 =	Gateway Tower 1	362 m (1,188 ft)	70	2028	India	GIFT City	
115 =	Bayz 102 Tower	362 m (1,188 ft)	103	2028	UAE	Dubai	
118	Bay Area Smart Plaza Tower A	358.1 m (1,175 ft)	65	2027	China	Shenzhen	
119	Binghatti Skyblade	357 m (1,171 ft)	66	2027	UAE	Dubai	
120	Guohong Center	356 m (1,168 ft)	71	2028	China	Wenzhou	
121	Four Seasons Hotel Tower 2	355 m (1,165 ft)	71	n/a	India	Mumbai	
122 =	Orchid Turf View 1	350 m (1,150 ft)	76		India	Mumbai	
122 =	Orchid Turf View 2	350 m (1,150 ft)	76		India	Mumbai	
122 =	Astana World Trade Center	350 m (1,150 ft)	91	n/a	Kazakhstan	Astana	
122 =	Trump International Hotel and Tower Dubai	350 m (1,150 ft)	80	2031	UAE	Dubai	
122 =	Waldorf Astoria Residences Dubai Business Bay	350 m (1,150 ft)	70	2029	UAE	Dubai	
122 =	Iran Mall Tower	350 m (1,150 ft)	53	2027	Iran	Tehran	
128	Rixos Financial Center Road Residences	348 m (1,142 ft)	87	2029	UAE	Dubai	
129 =	SRG Tower	346 m (1,135 ft)	90	n/a	UAE	Dubai	
129 =	King Salman Gate Tower 3	346 m (1,135 ft)	73	2032	Saudi Arabia	Mecca	
131	Vision Iconic Tower	342 m (1,122 ft)	82	2031	UAE	Dubai	
132 =	Keren Hakirya Main Tower	340 m (1,120 ft)	80	n/a	Israel	Tel Aviv	
132 =	Dushanbe Tower	340 m (1,120 ft)	77	2031	Tajikistan	Dushanbe	
132 =	Busan Lotte Tower	340 m (1,120 ft)	67	2028	South Korea	Busan	
132 =	Safa Two de Grisogono	340 m (1,120 ft)	85	2027	UAE	Dubai	
136	Zhonghai City Plaza	339.9 m (1,115 ft)	75	2026	China	Tianjin	
137	Liberation Tower	338 m (1,109 ft)	71	2028	Bangladesh	Dhaka	
138	Azrieli Spiral Tower	336 m (1,102 ft)	91	2027	Israel	Tel Aviv	
139	Shenzhen Bay Super Headquarters Based Tower C-2	336 m (1,102 ft)	68	2027	China	Shenzhen	
140 =	Tianjin Kerry Center	333 m (1,093 ft)	72	?	China	Tianjin	
140 =	Guangjian Financial Center	333 m (1,093 ft)	n/a	2027	China	Guangzhou	
140 =	Empire 88 Tower	333 m (1,093 ft)	88	n/a	Vietnam	Ho Chi Minh City	
140 =	J Tower 3	333 m (1,093 ft)	77	2028	Cambodia	Phnom Penh	
144 =	Ocean Tower 1	331 m (1,086 ft)	74	2027	India	Mumbai	
144 =	Ocean Tower 2	331 m (1,086 ft)	74	2027	India	Mumbai	
144 =	Green Energy Superblock Oasis Central Sudirman Tower 2	331 m (1,086 ft)	75	2028	Indonesia	Jakarta	
147 =	The Mirage at Sobha Central	330 m (1,080 ft)	84	2030	UAE	Dubai	
147 =	Bukit Bintang	330 m (1,080 ft)	68	2028	Malaysia	Kuala Lumpur	
147 =	Amwaj Twin Tower 1	330 m (1,080 ft)	70	2030	Iraq	Baghdad	
147 =	Amwaj Twin Tower 2	330 m (1,080 ft)	70	2030	Iraq	Baghdad	
151	Roppongi 5-Chome West District Tower A	327 m (1,073 ft)	66	2030	Japan	Tokyo	
151 =	25h Heimat	326 m (1,070 ft)	74	2027	UAE	Dubai	
153	Matru Mandhir	325 m (1,066 ft)	100	n/a	India	Mumbai	
154 =	Cipriani Tower	323 m (1,060 ft)	60+	2031	Azerbaijan	Baku	
154 =	Highwealth Huiguo 90	323 m (1,060 ft)	63	2028	Taiwan	Taichung	
156	Sumou Tower 1	322 m (1,056 ft)	72	2026	Saudi Arabia	Jeddah	
156 =	Jiangbei New Financial Center Phase I	320 m (1,050 ft)	63	2027	China	Nanjing	
156 =	Goldfinger Tower A	320 m (1,050 ft)	61	2026	China	Hangzhou	
156 =	India International Trade Centre	320 m (1,050 ft)	72	n/a	India	Mumbai	
156 =	Mong Kok East Station Redevelopment - Tower 2	320 m (1,050 ft)	70	2029	Hong Kong	Hong Kong	
161 =	Taihu Lake Main Landmark Tower	318 m (1,043 ft)	66	2026	China	Huzhou	
162	Como Residences	317 m (1,040 ft)	73	2027	UAE	Dubai	Tallest buildings in Palm Jumeirah
163	Asia Africa Tower	316 m (1,037 ft)	48	n/a	Indonesia	Bandung	
164	The Stratford Residences	312 m (1,024 ft)	70	2027	Philippines	Makati	It will become the Philippines' highest residential building.
165	Sugee Empire Tower	311 m (1,020 ft)	67	2028	India	Mumbai	
166	Morin Khuur Tower	309 m (1,014 ft)	30	n/a	Mongolia	Ulaanbaatar	
167	Aaradhya Avaan Tower 1	307 m (1,007 ft)	80	2028	India	Mumbai	
168 =	8 Shenton Way	306 m (1,004 ft)	63	2028	Singapore	Singapore	
168 =	Indonesia-1 North Tower	306 m (1,004 ft)	63	2027	Indonesia	Jakarta	
170	Tuwaiq Tower	305 m (1,001 ft)	51	2027	Saudi Arabia	Riyadh	
171	Indonesia-1 South Tower	303.5 m (996 ft)	57	2027	Indonesia	Jakarta	
172 =	Mongol Tower	301 m (988 ft)	68	n/a	Mongolia	Ulaanbaatar	
172 =	Baghdad Heights	301 m (988 ft)	68	2029	Iraq	Baghdad	
172 =	Sky link 1	301 m (988 ft)	81	2027	India	Mumbai	
172 =	Sky link 2	301 m (988 ft)	81	2027	India	Mumbai	
172 =	Shreepati Skies	301 m (988 ft)	88	n/a	India	Mumbai	
172 =	Sky Link Tower 1	301 m (988 ft)	85	2027	India	Mumbai	
172 =	Sky Link Tower 2	301 m (988 ft)	85	2027	India	Mumbai	
172 =	Waves	301 m (988 ft)	80	n/a	India	Mumbai	
180 =	Goldfinger Tower B	300 m (980 ft)	68	2026	China	Hangzhou	
180 =	Avrra by Palace	300 m (980 ft)	78	2031	UAE	Dubai	
180 =	Sikka Dream Height	300 m (980 ft)	80	n/a	India	Delhi	
180 =	Hangzhou West Railway Station Hub Tower 7	300 m (980 ft)	62	n/a	China	Hangzhou	
180 =	Indra Tower	300 m (980 ft)	80	n/a	India	Mumbai	
180 =	KRTE AFRD Tower	300 m (980 ft)	94	n/a	India	Bengaluru	
180 =	Powerlong Plaza	300 m (980 ft)	n/a	n/a	China	Wuhan	
180 =	North Bund Tower 3	300 m (980 ft)	n/a	n/a	China	Shanghai	

=== On hold ===
This list ranks skyscrapers whose construction is on hold that are planned to rise over 300 metres (984 ft).

Building	Planned pinnacle height	Floors	Proposed completion	Country	City
The Bride Tower 1	1,152 m (3,780 ft)	241	n/a (Proposed)	Iraq	Basra
Tradewinds Square Tower A	775 m (2,543 ft)	150	n/a (Proposed)	Malaysia	Kuala Lumpur
The Bride Tower 2	724 m (2,375 ft)	181	n/a (Proposed)	Iraq	Basra
India Tower	707.5 m (2,321 ft)	126	n/a	India	Mumbai
Tower M	700 m (2,300 ft)	145	2030 (Proposed)	Malaysia	Kuala Lumpur
Anara Tower	687 m (2,254 ft)	135	n/a (Proposed)	UAE	Dubai
PAGCOR Tower	655 m (2,149 ft)	112	n/a	Philippines	Manila
Al-Aman World Capital Center	625 m (2,051 ft)	110	n/a	Sri Lanka	Colombo
Rama IX Super Tower	615 m (2,018 ft)	125	2033	Thailand	Bangkok
Incheon Tower	613 m (2,011 ft)	151	2030	South Korea	Incheon
The Blade	610 m (2,000 ft)	128	n/a	Saudi Arabia	Riyadh
Lanco Hills Signature Tower	604 m (1,982 ft)	112	n/a	India	Hyderabad
Port Tower Complex	593 m (1,946 ft)	117	n/a (Proposed)	Pakistan	Karachi
Baoneng Binhu Center	588 m (1,929 ft)	119	n/a (Proposed)	China	Hefei
Doha Tower and Convention Center	570 m (1,870 ft)	112	n/a	Qatar	Doha
Thai Boon Roong Twin Tower World Trade Center 1	567 m (1,860 ft)	133	n/a (Proposed)	Cambodia	Phnom Penh
Thai Boon Roong Twin Tower World Trade Center 2	567 m (1,860 ft)	133	n/a (Proposed)	Cambodia	Phnom Penh
Burj Jumeirah	550 m (1,800 ft)	112	n/a	UAE	Dubai
Icon Tower	535 m (1,755 ft)	95	n/a	Saudi Arabia	Jeddah
Tiger Tower 2	529 m (1,736 ft)	148	n/a	UAE	Dubai
Pertamina Energy Tower	523 m (1,716 ft)	99	2030	Indonesia	Jakarta
Evergrande Hefei Center T1	518 m (1,699 ft)	112	2028	China	Hefei
Dalian Greenland Center	518 m (1,699 ft)	88	2030	China	Dalian
Qatar National Bank Tower	510 m (1,670 ft)	101	n/a	Qatar	Doha
Xiangmi Lake New Financial Center Tower 1	500 m (1,600 ft)	109	n/a	China	Shenzhen
The Line	500 m (1,600 ft)	n/a	2045	Saudi Arabia	Jeddah
Suzhou Zhongnan Center	499.2 m (1,638 ft)	103	2028	China	Suzhou
Fuyuan Zhongshan 108 IFC	498 m (1,634 ft)	108	2029	China	Zhongshan
China International Silk Road Center	498 m (1,634 ft)	101	2027	China	Xi'an
Al Quds Endowment Tower	495 m (1,624 ft)	100	n/a	Qatar	Doha
Rizhao Center	485 m (1,591 ft)	94	2028	China	Rizhao
The Bride Tower 3	484 m (1,588 ft)	121	n/a (Proposed)	Iraq	Basra
Chushang Building	475 m (1,558 ft)	111	n/a	China	Wuhan
SUNAC A-ONE Tower 1	470 m (1,540 ft)	103	2030	China	Chongqing
Fosun Bund Center T1	470 m (1,540 ft)	n/a	n/a	China	Wuhan
Tianjin R&F Guangdong Tower	468 m (1,535 ft)	91	2027	China	Tianjin
Tianshan Gate of the World	450 m (1,480 ft)	106	2030	China	Shijiazhuang
Dubai Towers 1	448 m (1,470 ft)	87	n/a	Saudi Arabia	Jeddah
Dubai Towers Doha	437 m (1,434 ft)	91	n/a	Qatar	Doha
One Bangkok Signature Tower	436.1 m (1,431 ft)	92	2030	Thailand	Bangkok
Burj Almasa	432 m (1,417 ft)	93	2028	Saudi Arabia	JeddahThe Line, Saudi Arabia
Asia Plaza	431 m (1,414 ft)	103	2030	Taiwan	Kaohsiung
Chongqing Tall Tower	431 m (1,414 ft)	101	n/a	China	Chongqing
Nanjing Olympic Suning Tower	419.8 m (1,377 ft)	99	n/a	China	Nanjing
Dongfeng Plaza Landmark Tower	407 m (1,335 ft)	100	2027	China	Kunming
Haiyun Plaza Tower 1	390 m (1,280 ft)	86	2026	China	Rizhao
Riyadh Tower	389 m (1,276 ft)	97	n/a	Saudi Arabia	Riyadh
La Maison by HDS	386.5 m (1,268 ft)	105	n/a	UAE	Dubai
Forum 66 Tower 2	384 m (1,260 ft)	76	2025	China	Shenyang
Icon Towers 1	384 m (1,260 ft)	77	2029	Indonesia	Jakarta
Altitude	383 m (1,257 ft)	96	n/a	Sri Lanka	Colombo
Guiyang World Trade Center Landmark Tower	380 m (1,250 ft)	92	n/a	China	Guiyang
Greenland Star City Light Tower	379.9 m (1,246 ft)	83	2027	China	Changsha
The One: The One Tower	376 m (1,234 ft)	92	2027	Sri Lanka	Colombo
Square Capital Tower	376 m (1,234 ft)	70	2030	Kuwait	Kuwait City
Nanchang Ping An Financial Center	373 m (1,224 ft)	72	n/a	China	Nanchang
Xiangmi Lake New Financial Center Tower 2	370 m (1,210 ft)	81	2026	China	Shenzhen
Xiangmi Lake New Financial Center Tower 3	370 m (1,210 ft)	80	2026	China	Shenzhen
Fairmont Kuala Lumpur Tower 1	370 m (1,210 ft)	78	2028	Malaysia	Kuala Lumpur
Coronation Square Tower 1	370 m (1,210 ft)	78	2028	Malaysia	Johor Bahru
Arabtec Tower	369 m (1,211 ft)	77	n/a	UAE	Dubai
Hengli Global Operations Headquarters Tower 1	369 m (1,211 ft)	n/a	2027	China	Suzhou
VietinBank Business Center Office Tower	363 m (1,191 ft)	68	n/a	Vietnam	Hanoi
Wanda One	360 m (1,180 ft)	86	2028	China	Xi'an
Sino Steel International Plaza T2	358 m (1,175 ft)	83	n/a	China	Tianjin
Naga 3 Tower A	358 m (1,175 ft)	75	n/a	Cambodia	Phnom Penh
Fosun Bund Center T2	356 m (1,168 ft)	n/a	n/a	China	Wuhan
KPT Tower	352 m (1,155 ft)	80	n/a	Pakistan	Karachi
Agricultural Development Center Tower 1	350 m (1,150 ft)	n/a	n/a	China	Harbin
Global Port Tower 1	350 m (1,150 ft)	n/a	n/a	China	Lanzhou
Global Port Tower 2	350 m (1,150 ft)	n/a	n/a	China	Lanzhou
Baolixian Village Old Reform Project Main	350 m (1,150 ft)	70	2028	China	Guangzhou
SUNAC A-ONE Tower 4	349 m (1,145 ft)	89	2026	China	Chongqing
Golden Century Plaza	348 m (1,142 ft)	72	n/a	China	Linyi
Skyfame Center Landmark Tower	346 m (1,135 ft)	72	2026	China	Nanning
Riyadh Tower (Nikken Sekkei's Proposal)	338 m (1,109 ft)	73	n/a	Saudi Arabia	Riyadh
Yuetai Zhuxi Financial Center	336 m (1,102 ft)	71	n/a	China	Jiangmen
Mandarin Oriental Hotel Tower A	333 m (1,093 ft)	73	n/a	China	Chengdu
Wanling Global Center	337 m (1,106 ft)	70	2027	China	Zhuhai
Jiujiang IFC	333 m (1,093 ft)	66	2026	China	Jiujiang
Jinqiao Sub-Center Block C1 Tower 1	330 m (1,080 ft)	n/a	n/a	China	Shanghai
Gate of Kuwait	330 m (1,080 ft)	84	n/a	Kuwait	Kuwait City
The One - Ritz Carlton Hotel and Residences	326 m (1,070 ft)	84	n/a	Sri Lanka	Colombo
Dongfeng Plaza Tower 2	326 m (1,070 ft)	72	2027	China	Kunming
Ankangyuan Tower 1	320 m (1,050 ft)	n/a	n/a	China	Shanghai
Suhewan Hiaxing New City Tower 1	320 m (1,050 ft)	67	2028	China	Shanghai
Jiuzhou Bay Tower	318.5 m (1,045 ft)	64	n/a	China	Zhuhai
China South City Tower 1	318 m (1,043 ft)	68	n/a	China	Nanning
Shaoxing Longemont Tower	318 m (1,043 ft)	71	n/a	China	Shaoxing
Foshan Shuntie Holdings Tower	318 m (1,043 ft)	90	2027	China	Foshan
Yurun International Tower	317 m (1,040 ft)	75	n/a	China	Huaiyin
BDNI Center 1	317 m (1,040 ft)	62	n/a	Indonesia	Jakarta
Namaste Tower	310 m (1,020 ft)	63	n/a	India	Mumbai
Kempinski Hotel & Residences	308 m (1,010 ft)	72	2027	Malaysia	Kuala Lumpur
Dubai Towers 2	308 m (1,010 ft)	60	n/a	Saudi Arabia	Jeddah
Xiangmi Lake Financial Tower	308 m (1,010 ft)	n/a	2026	China	Shenzhen
Wuhan Yangtze River Center Tower 2	305 m (1,001 ft)	65	n/a	China	Wuhan
The One - JW Marriott	303 m (994 ft)	76	2026	Sri Lanka	Colombo
SUNAC A-ONE Tower 2	302.1 m (991 ft)	72	2026	China	Chongqing
Shimao Pingshan Center	302 m (991 ft)	61	2026	China	Shenzhen
Shang Xin International Plaza	301 m (988 ft)	65	n/a	China	Chongqing
Greenland Center North Tower	301 m (988 ft)	58	n/a	China	Yinchuan
Greenland Center South Tower	301 m (988 ft)	54	n/a	China	Yinchuan
Shimao Riverside Block D2b	300.1 m (985 ft)	53	n/a	China	Shanghai
Hangzhou West Railway Station Hub Tower 2	300 m (980 ft)	68	n/a	China	Hangzhou
Tameer Commercial Tower	300 m (980 ft)	74	n/a	UAE	Abu Dhabi
Brys Buzz	300 m (980 ft)	82	n/a	India	Greater Noida
Urbana Twisted Tower	300 m (980 ft)	75	n/a (Proposed)	India	Kolkata
Xiangmi Lake New Financial Center Tower 4	300 m (980 ft)	64	2026	China	Shenzhen
Runhua Global Center 1	300 m (980 ft)	63	n/a	China	Changzhou

== Timeline of tallest buildings ==
Name	Country	City	Years as tallest	Metres	Feet	Floors
Nanfang Building	China	Guangzhou	1922–1927	49	161	12
Customs House, Shanghai	China	Shanghai	1927–1929	82	269	9
Sassoon House, Shanghai	China	Shanghai	1929-1934	83	272	10
Park Hotel Shanghai	China	Shanghai	1934–1963	84	275	24
Habib Bank Plaza	Pakistan	Karachi	1963–1965	101	331	25
Shalom Meir Tower	Israel	Tel Aviv	1965–1968	142	466	34
Kasumigaseki Building	Japan	Tokyo	1968–1970	156	512	36
World Trade Center	Japan	Tokyo	1970–1971	163	534	40
Keio Plaza Hotel	Japan	Tokyo	1971–1972	178	584	47
Jardine House	Hong Kong		1972–1973	178	586	52
Shinjuku Sumitomo Building	Japan	Tokyo	1973–1974	210	690	52
Shinjuku Mitsui Building	Japan	Tokyo	1974–1978	225	738	55
Sunshine 60	Japan	Tokyo	1978–1985	239	784	60
63 Building	South Korea	Seoul	1985–1986	249	819	63
OUB Centre	Singapore		1986–1990	280	919	63
Bank of China Tower	Hong Kong		1990–1992	367	1,205	72
Central Plaza	Hong Kong		1992–1996	374	1,227	78
Shun Hing Square	China	Shenzhen	1996-1997	384	1,260	69
CITIC Plaza	China	Guangzhou	1997–1998	391	1,283	80
Petronas Tower 1	Malaysia	Kuala Lumpur	1998–2003	452	1,483	88
Petronas Tower 2	Malaysia	Kuala Lumpur	1998–2003	452	1,483	88
Taipei 101	Taiwan	Taipei	2003–2009	508	1,670	101
Burj Khalifa	United Arab Emirates	Dubai	2009–present	828	2,717	163

== Gallery ==
Burj Khalifa in Dubai, United Arab Emirates, is the world's tallest building.

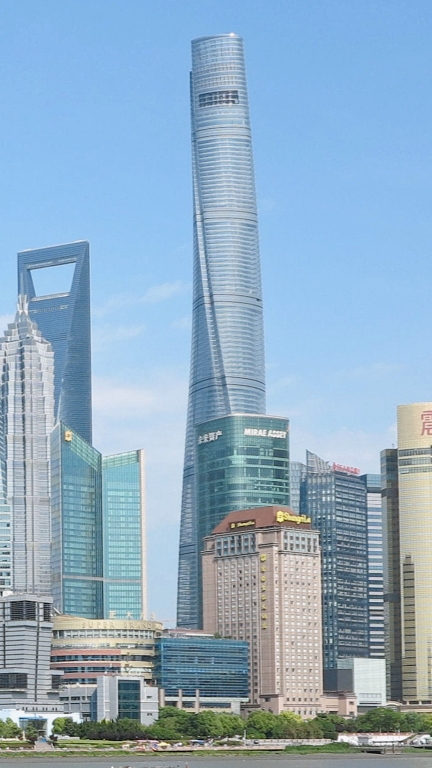
Shanghai Tower in Shanghai, China, is the 3rd tallest building in Asia.

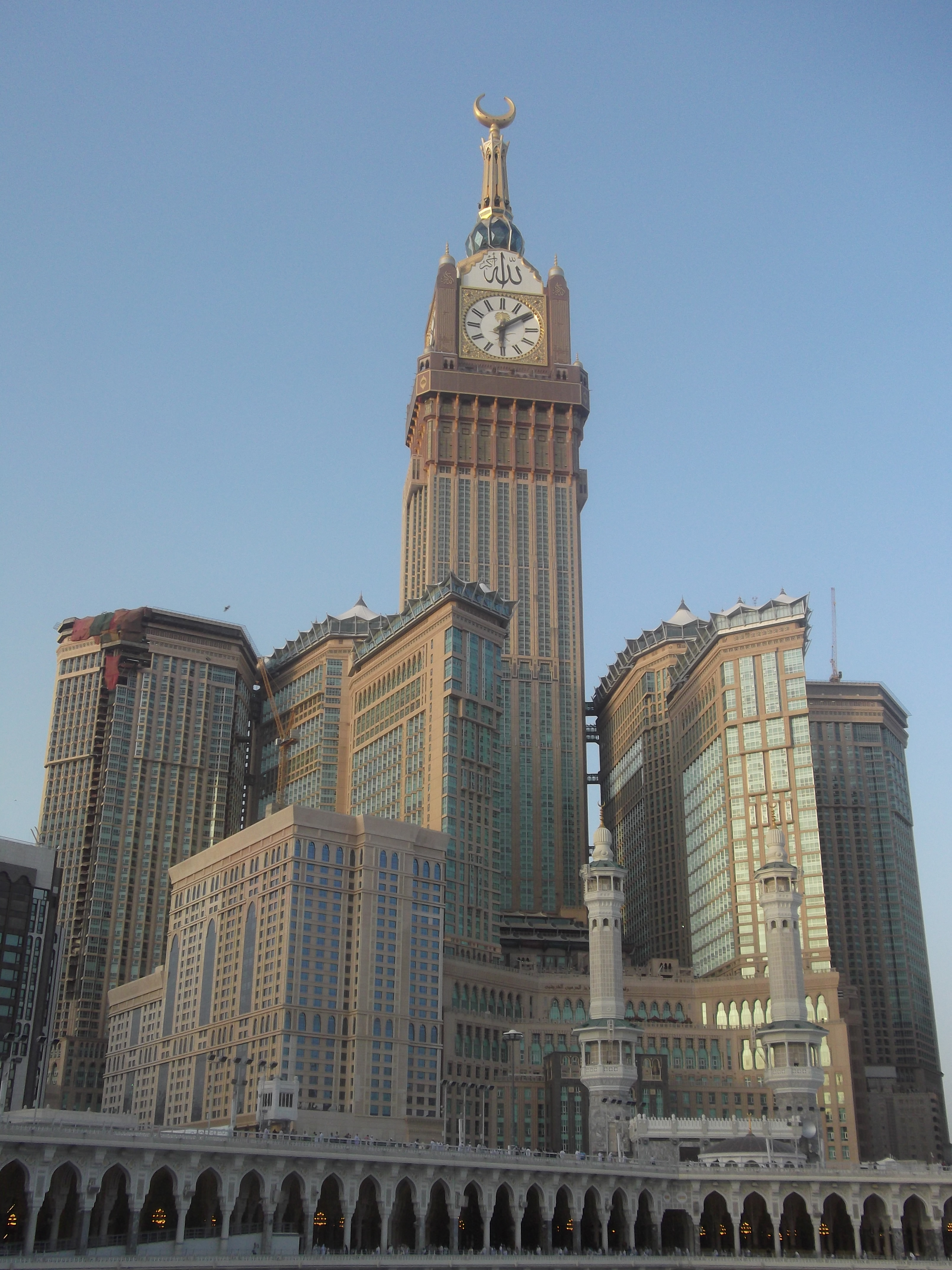
Abraj Al-Bait Clock Tower in Makkah, Saudi Arabia, is the 4th tallest building in Asia.

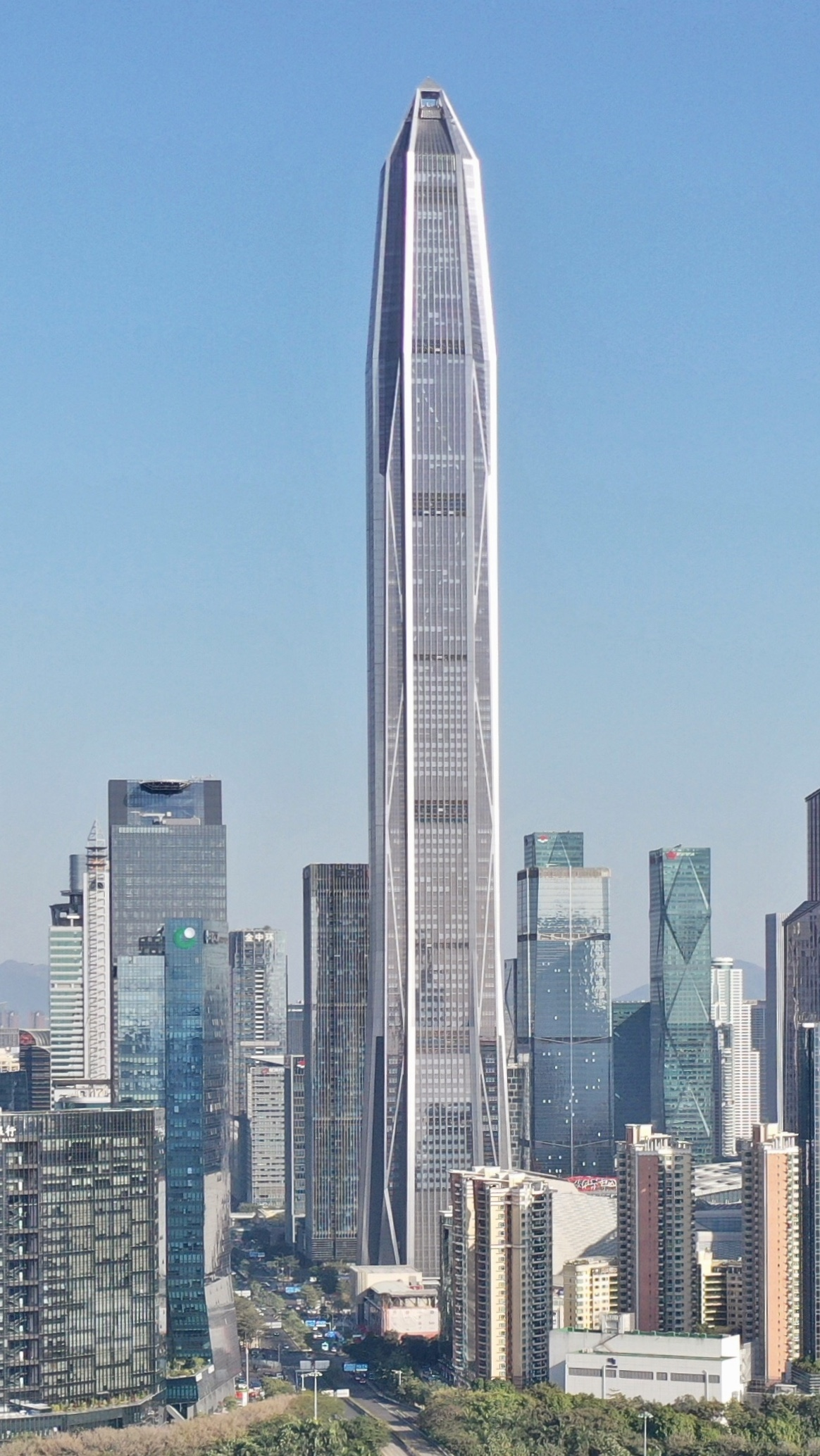
Ping An Finance Centre in Shenzhen, China, is the 5th tallest building in Asia.

Lotte World Tower in Seoul, South Korea, is the 6th tallest building in Asia.

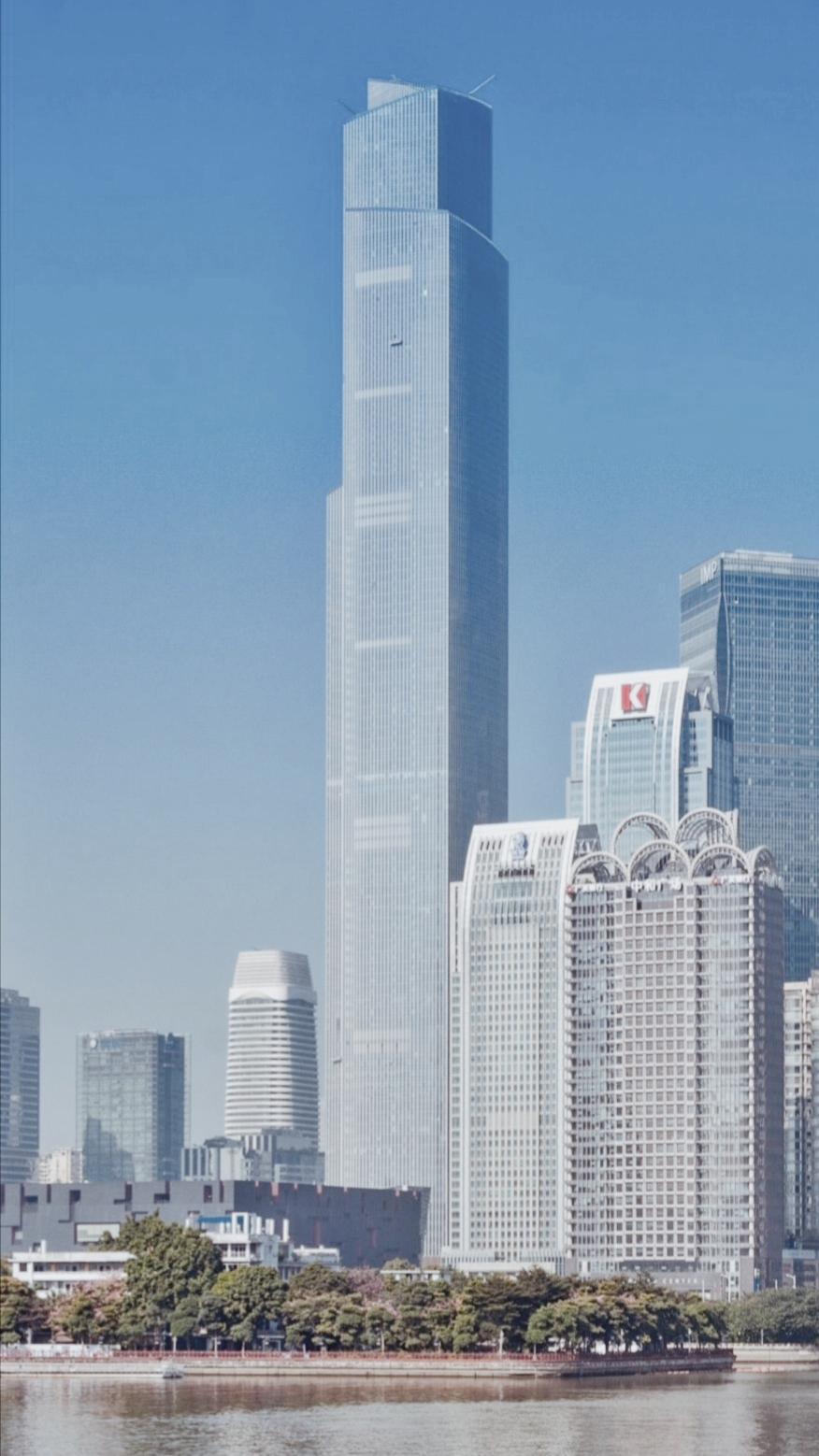
CTF Finance Centre in Guangzhou, China, is the tied 7th tallest building in Asia.

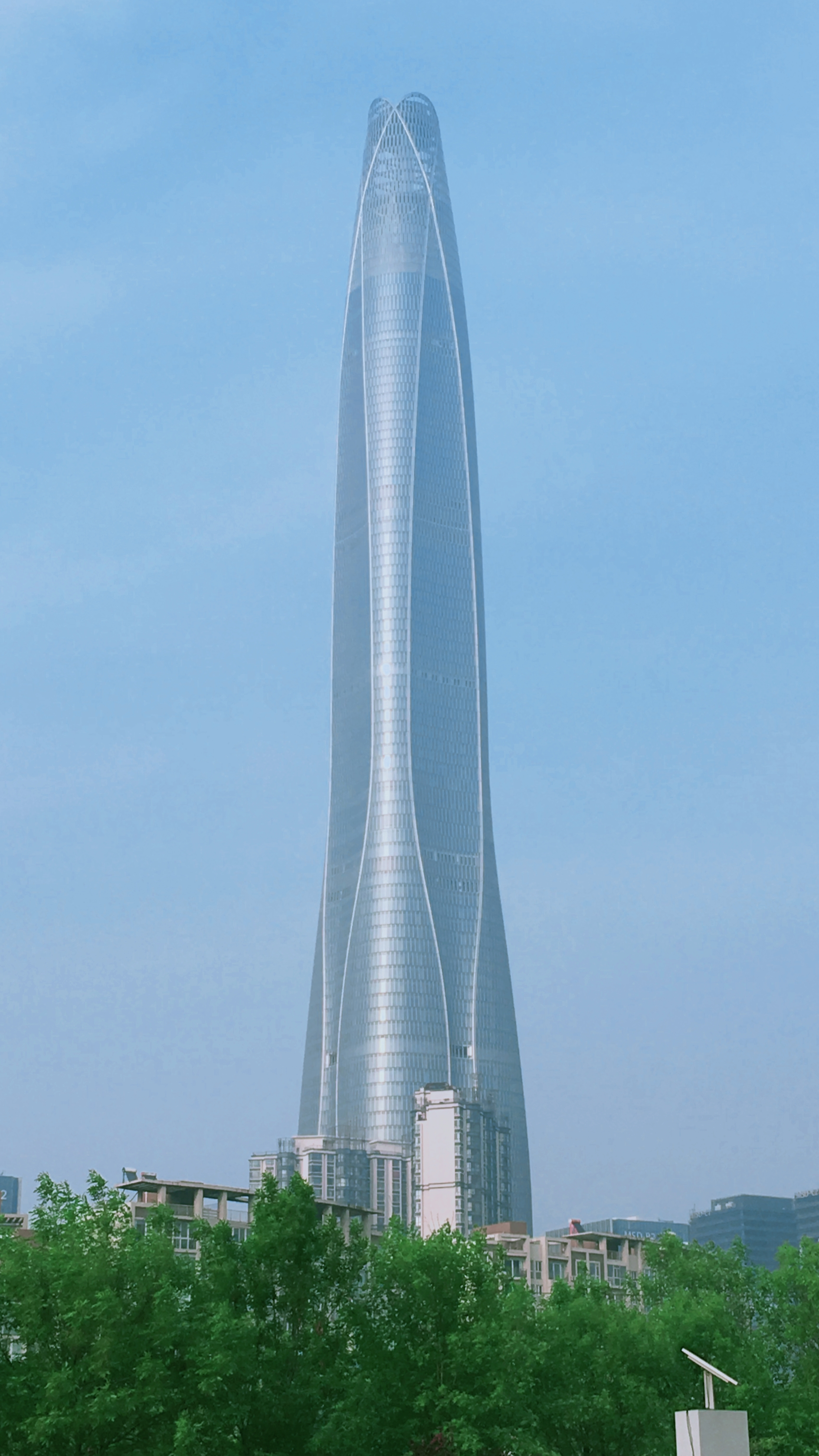
CTF Finance Centre in Tianjin, China, is the tied 7th tallest building in Asia.

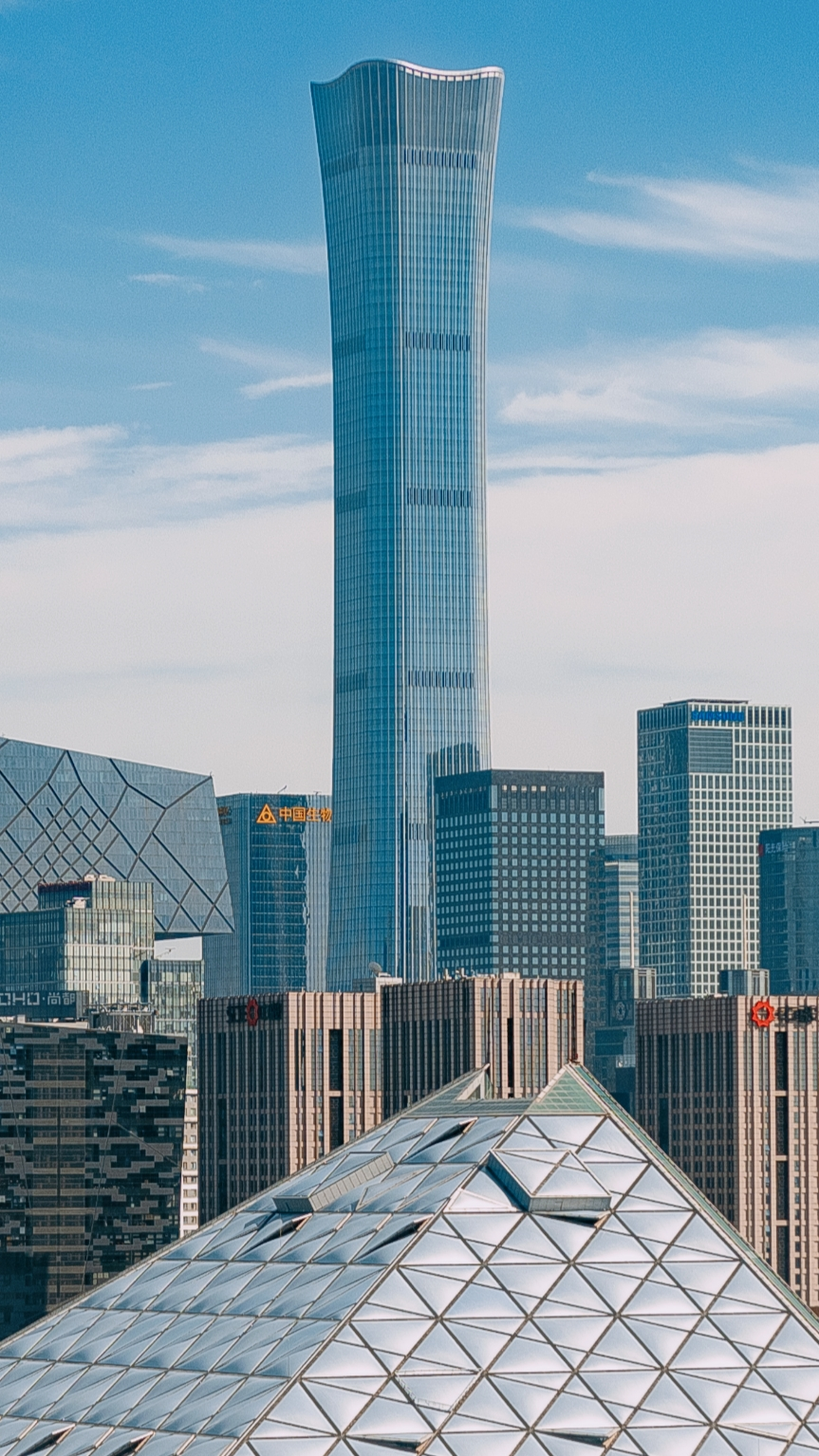
China Zun in Beijing, China, is the 9th tallest building in Asia.

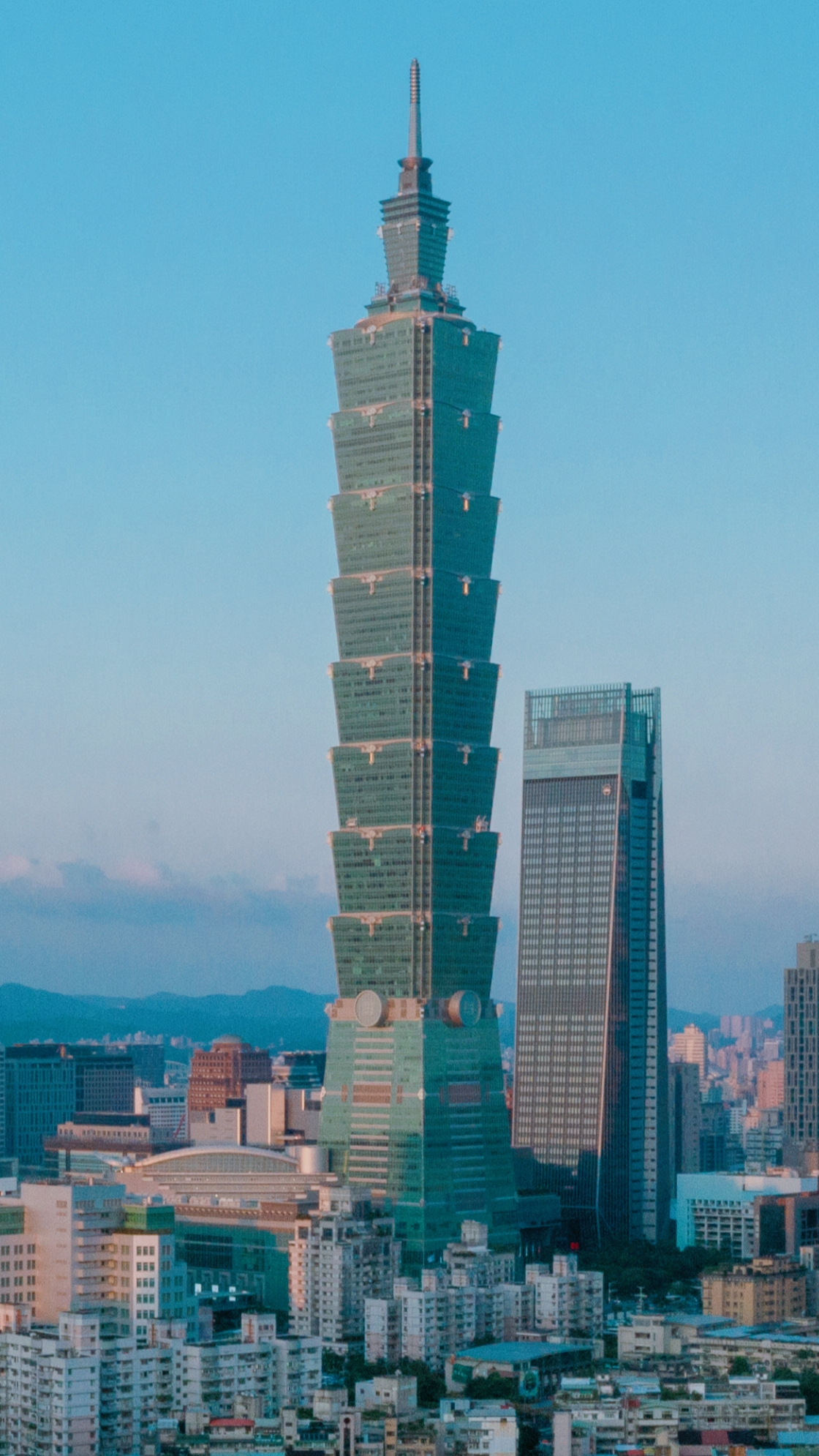
Taipei 101 in Taipei, Taiwan, was the world's tallest building from 2003 to 2009; it is now 10th in Asia.

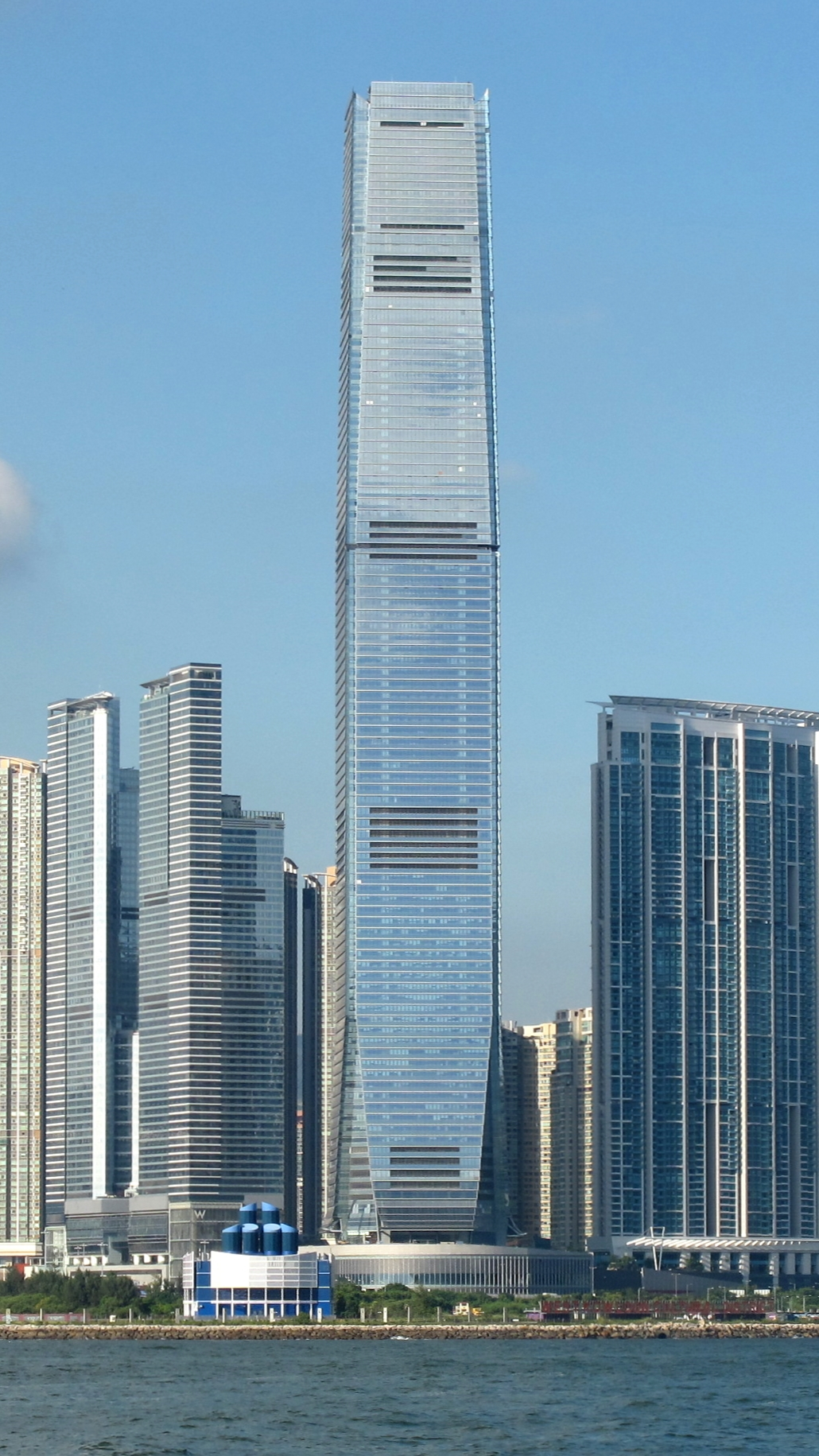
International Commerce Centreo in Hong Kong, is the 12th tallest building in Asia.

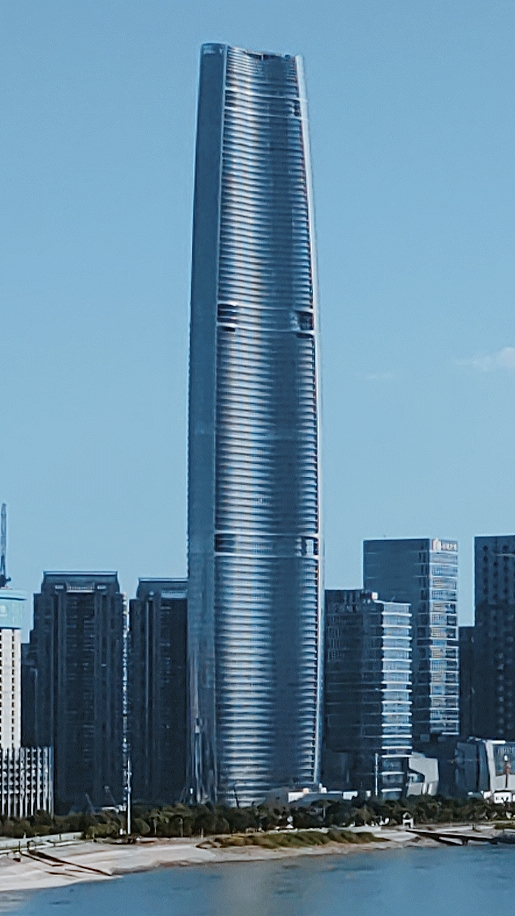
Wuhan Greenland Center in Wuhan, China, is the 13th tallest building in Asia.

Landmark 81 in Ho Chi Minh City, Vietnam, is the 14th tallest building in Asia.

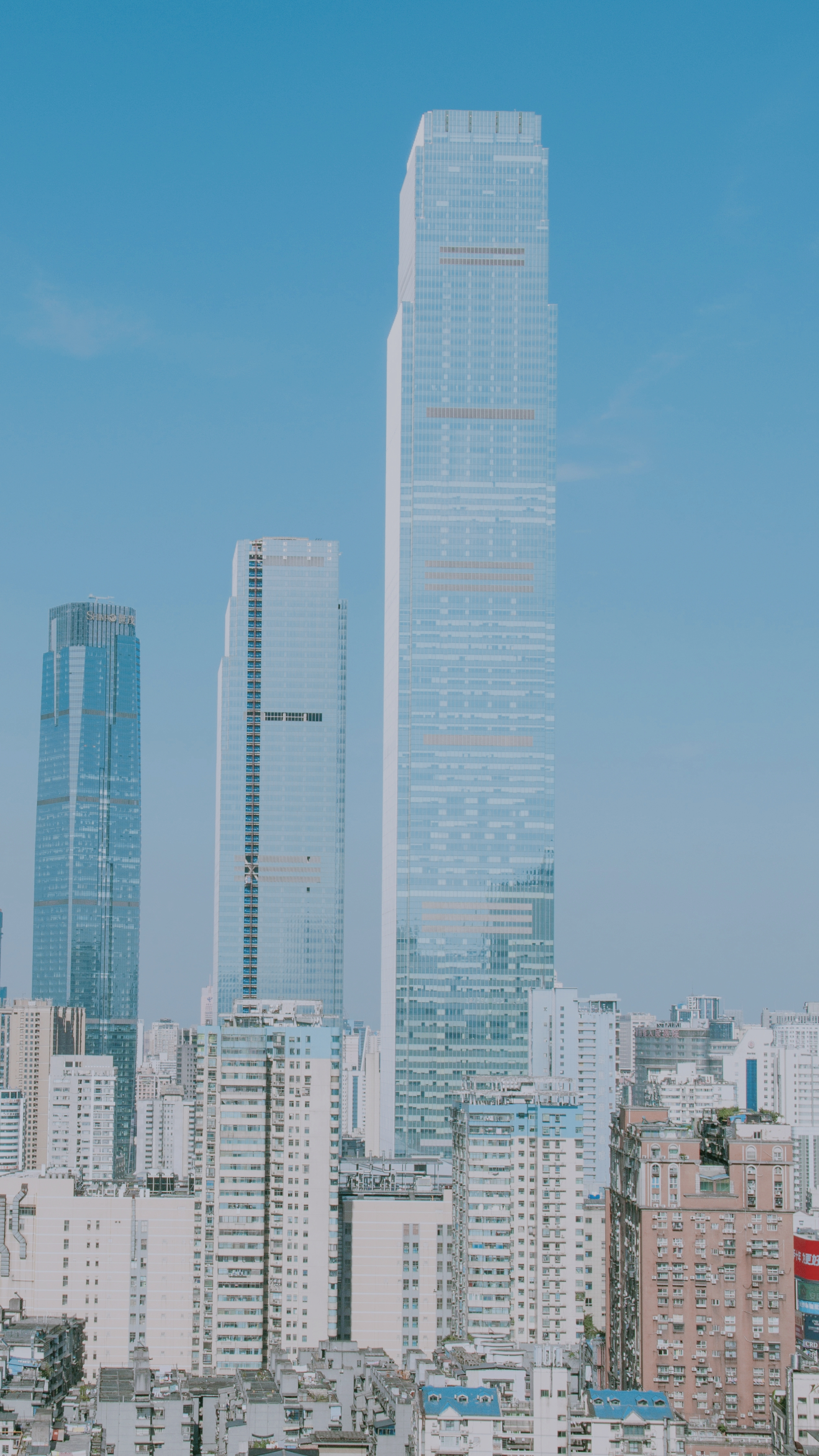
Changsha IFS Tower 1 in Changsha, China, is the 16th tallest building in Asia.

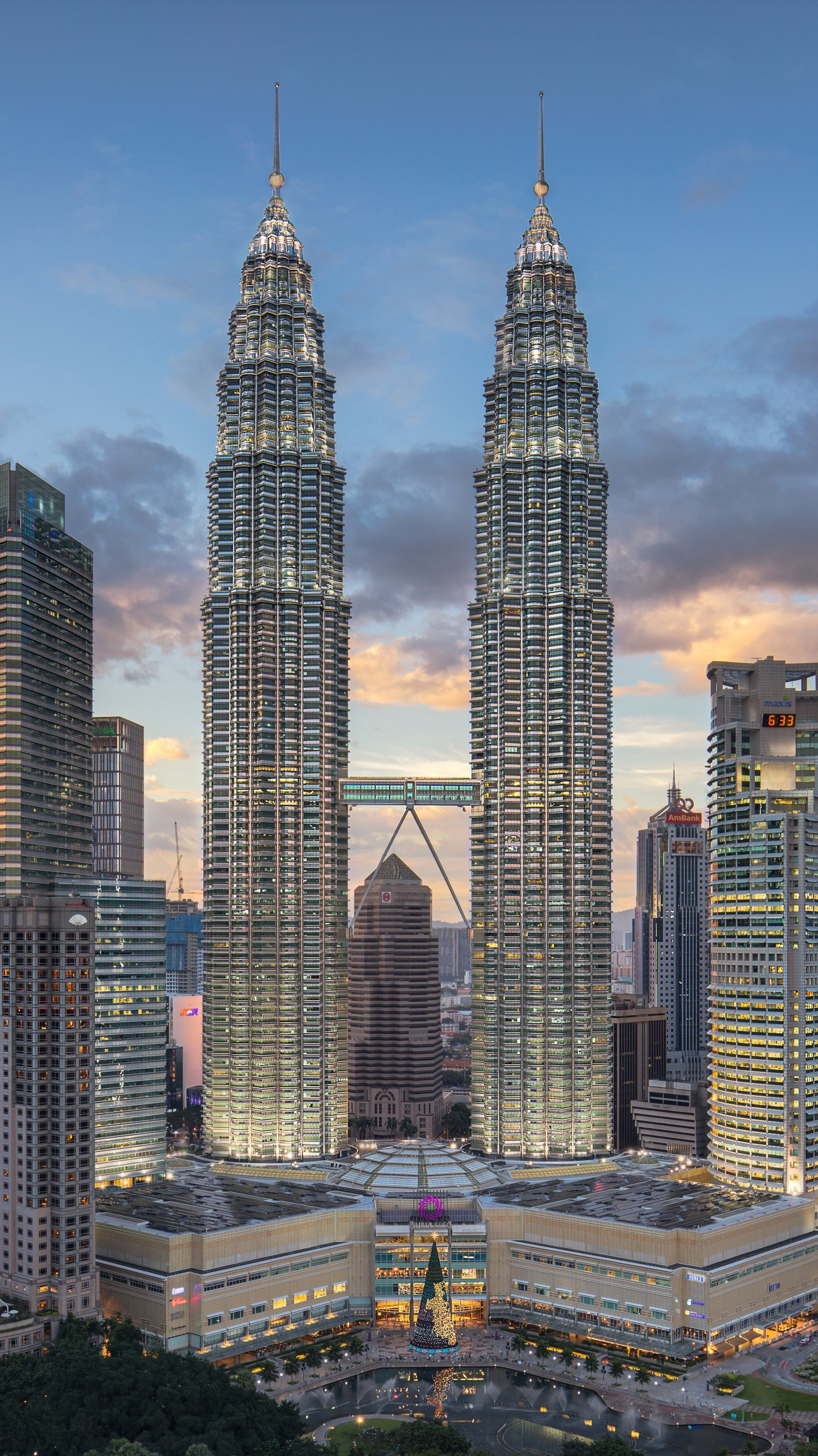
Petronas Tower in Kuala Lumpur, Malaysia, was the world's tallest building from 1998 to 2003; it is world's tallest twin tower.

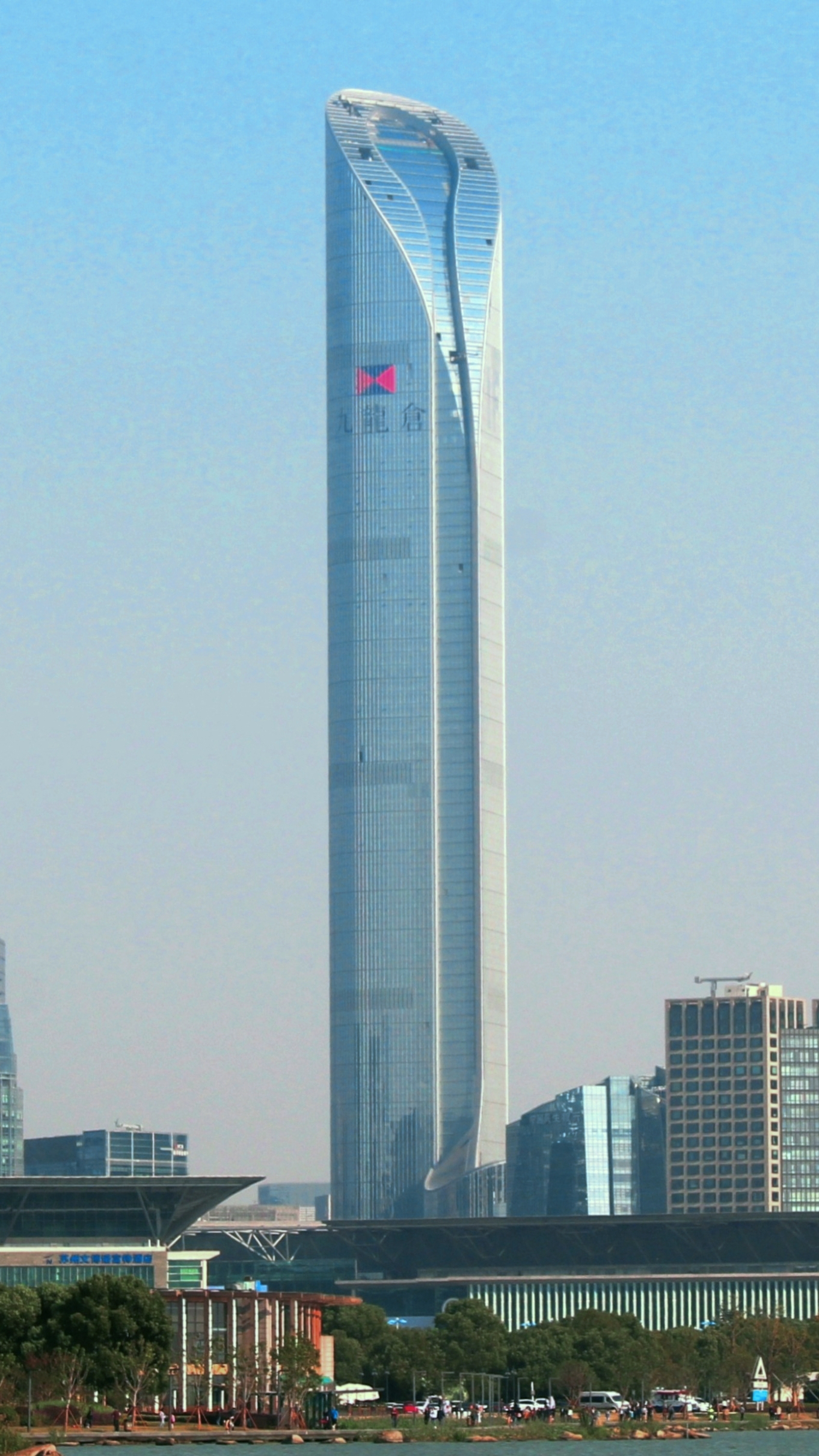
Suzhou IFS in Suzhou, China

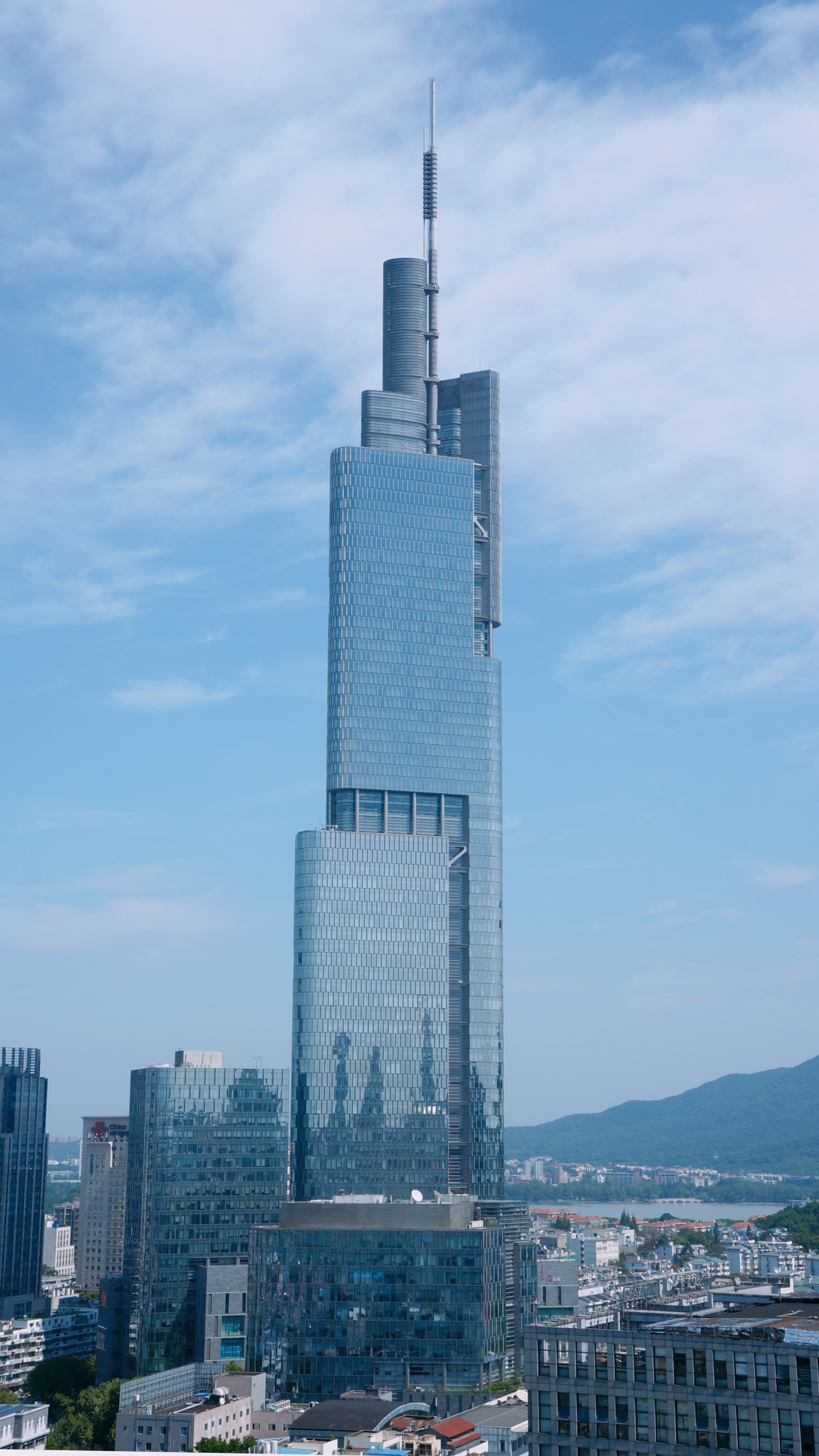
Zifeng Tower in Nanjing, China

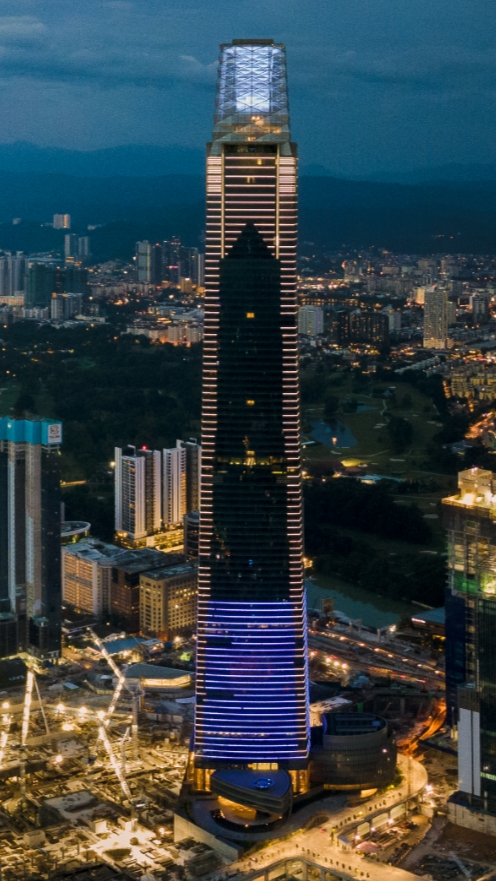
The Exchange 106 in Kuala Lumpur, Malaysia, is the 21st tallest building in Asia.

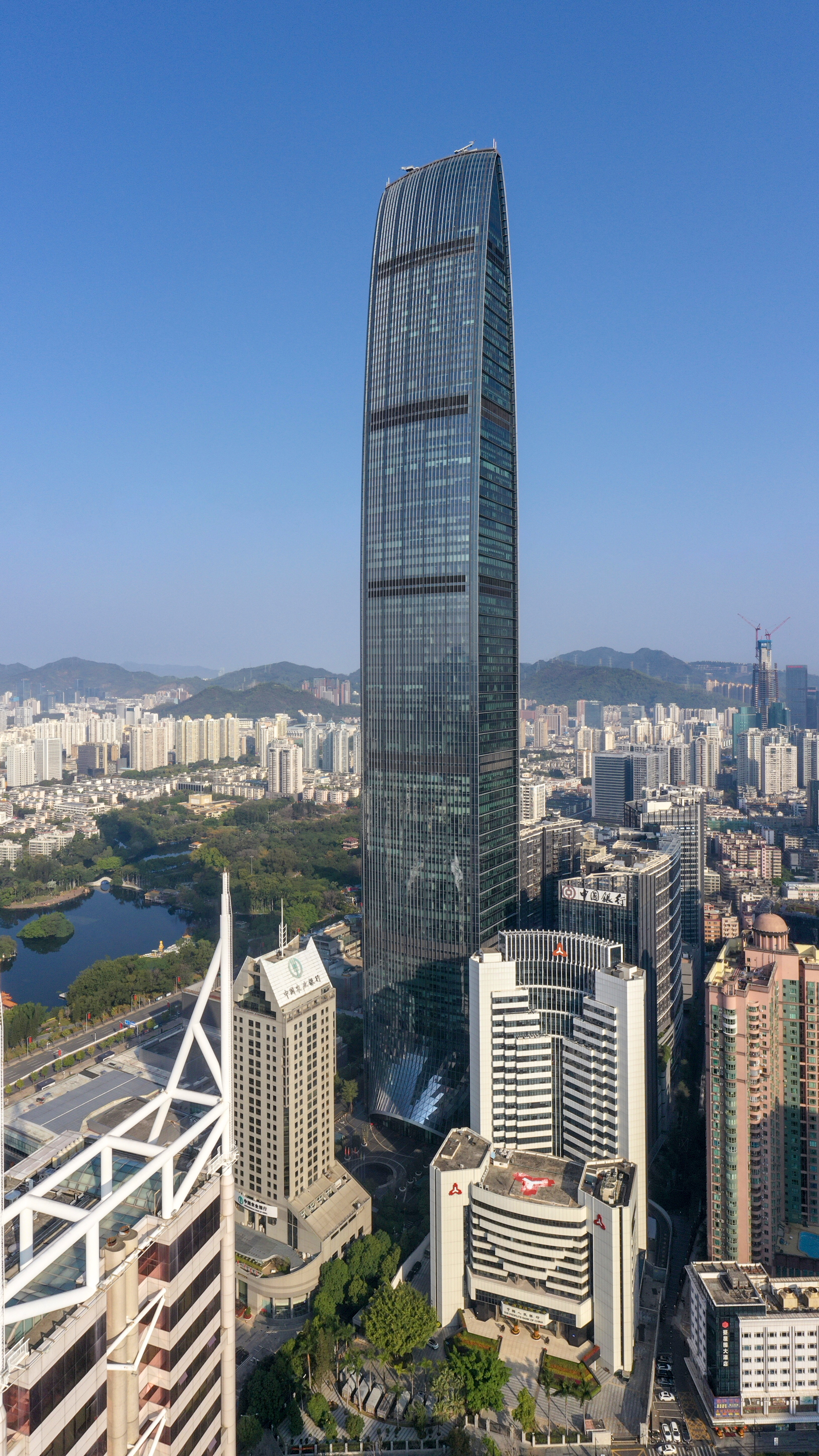
KK100 in Shenzhen, China

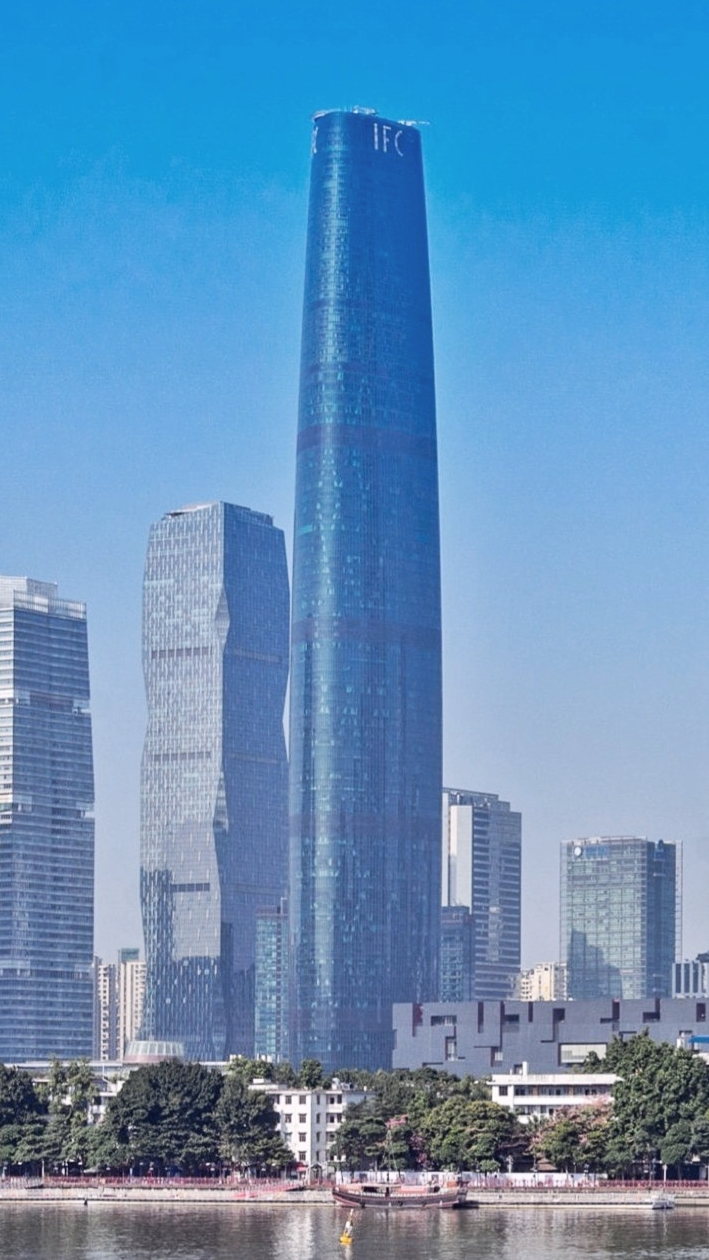
Guangzhou International Finance Center in Guangzhou, China

Marina 101 in Dubai, United Arab Emirates

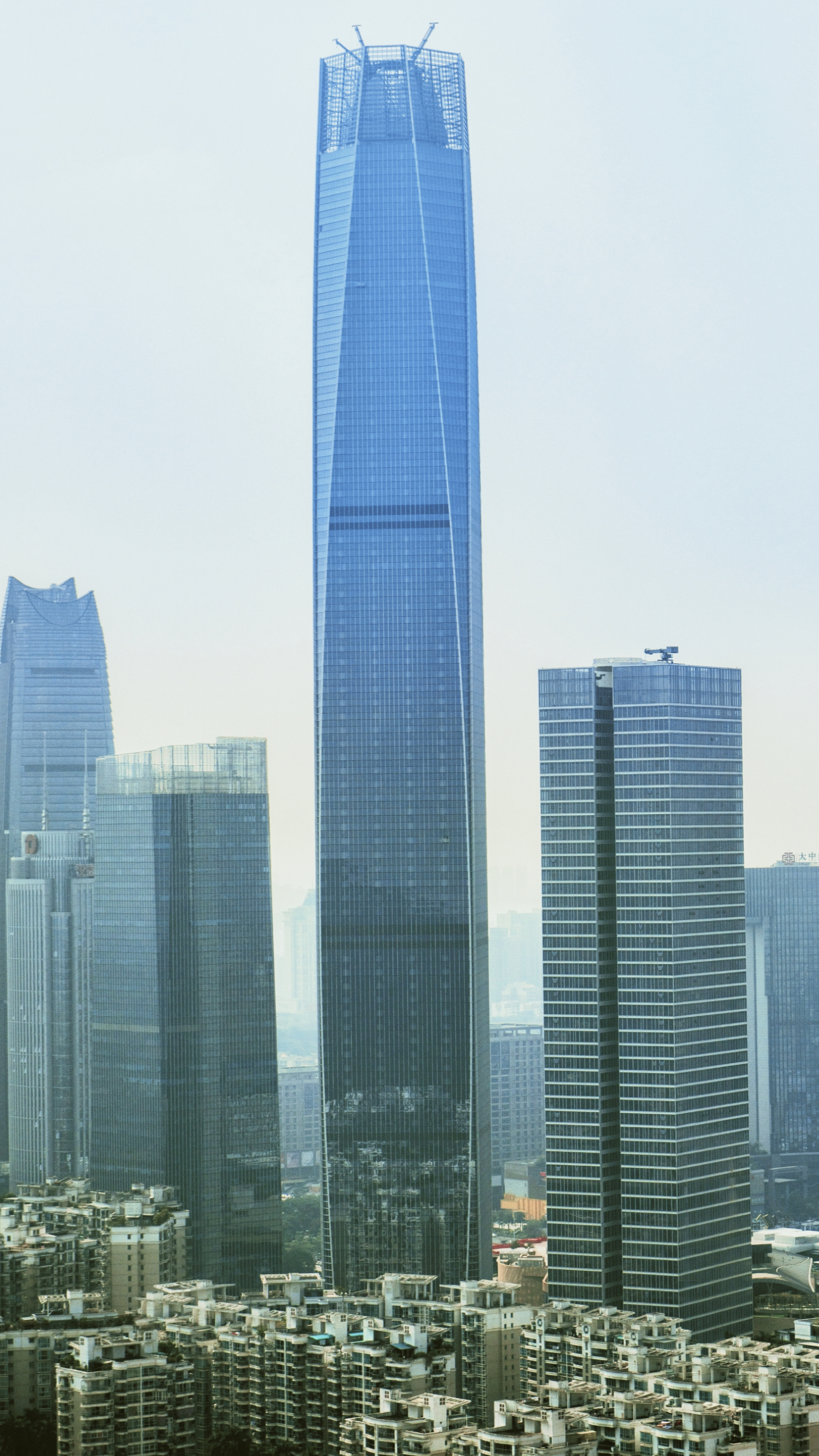
Dongguan International Trade Center 1 in Dongguan, China

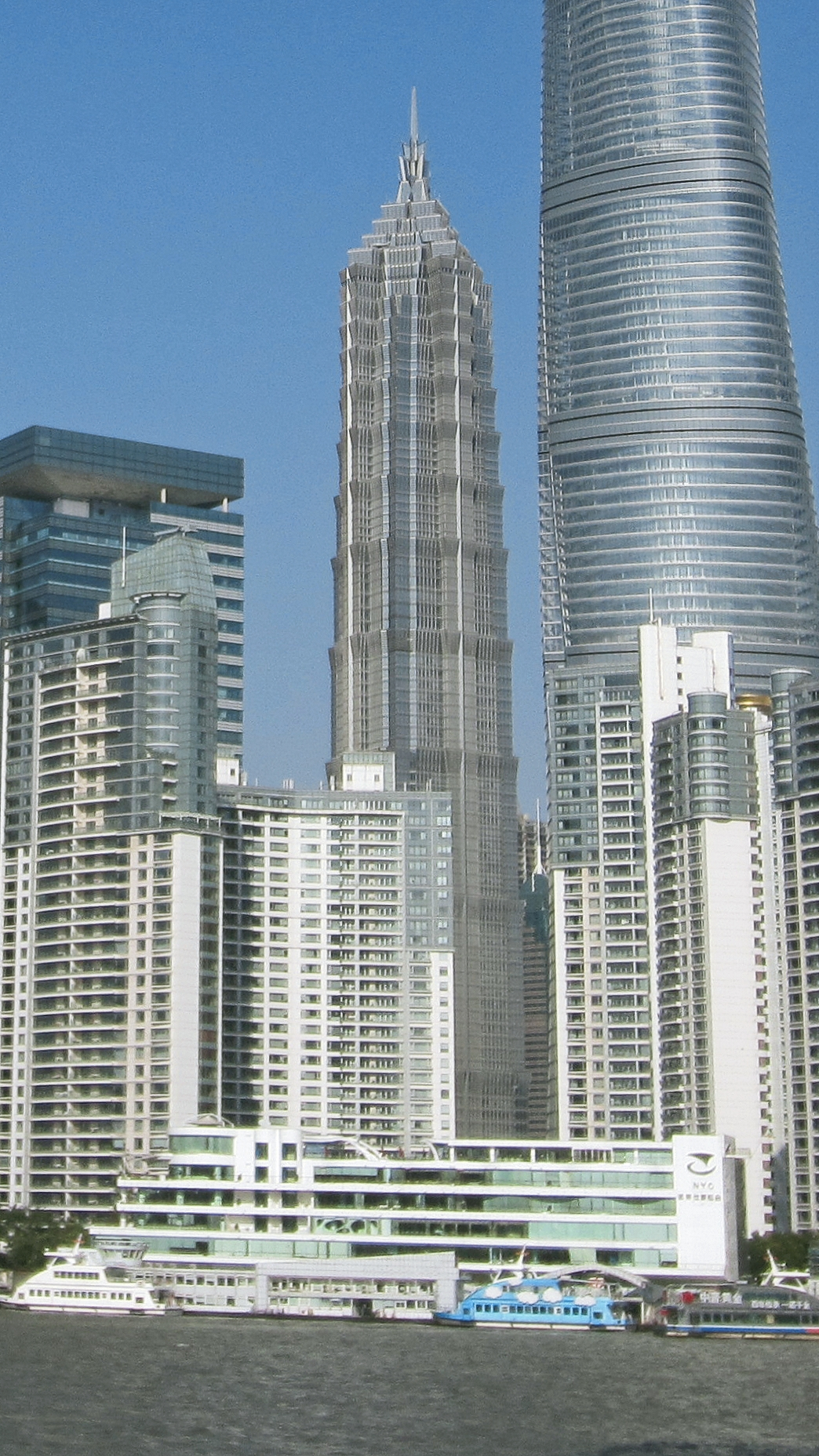
Jin Mao Tower in Shanghai, China

Princess Tower in Dubai, United Arab Emirates

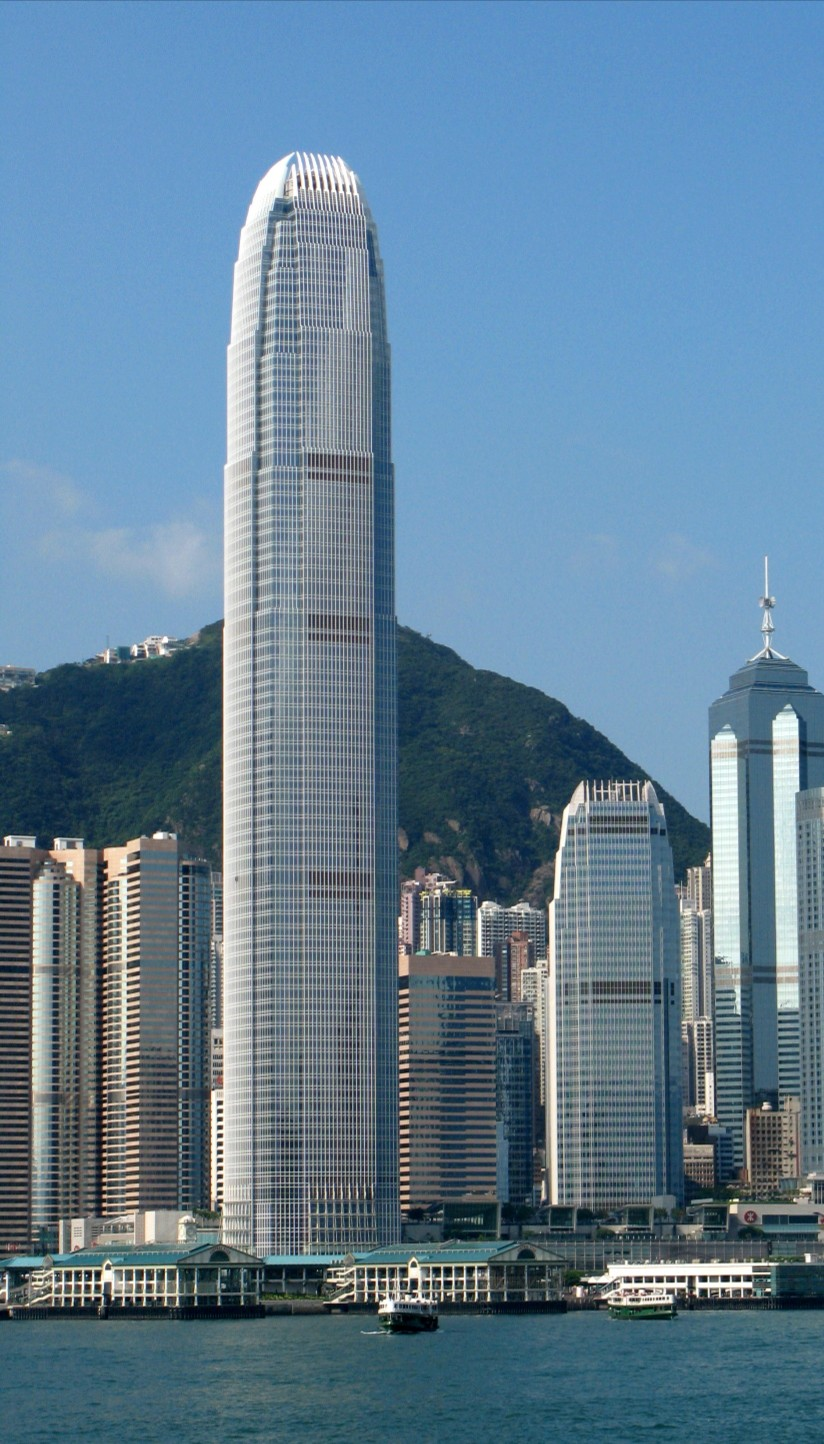
Two International Finance Centre in Hong Kong

Haeundae LCT The Sharp in Busan, South Korea

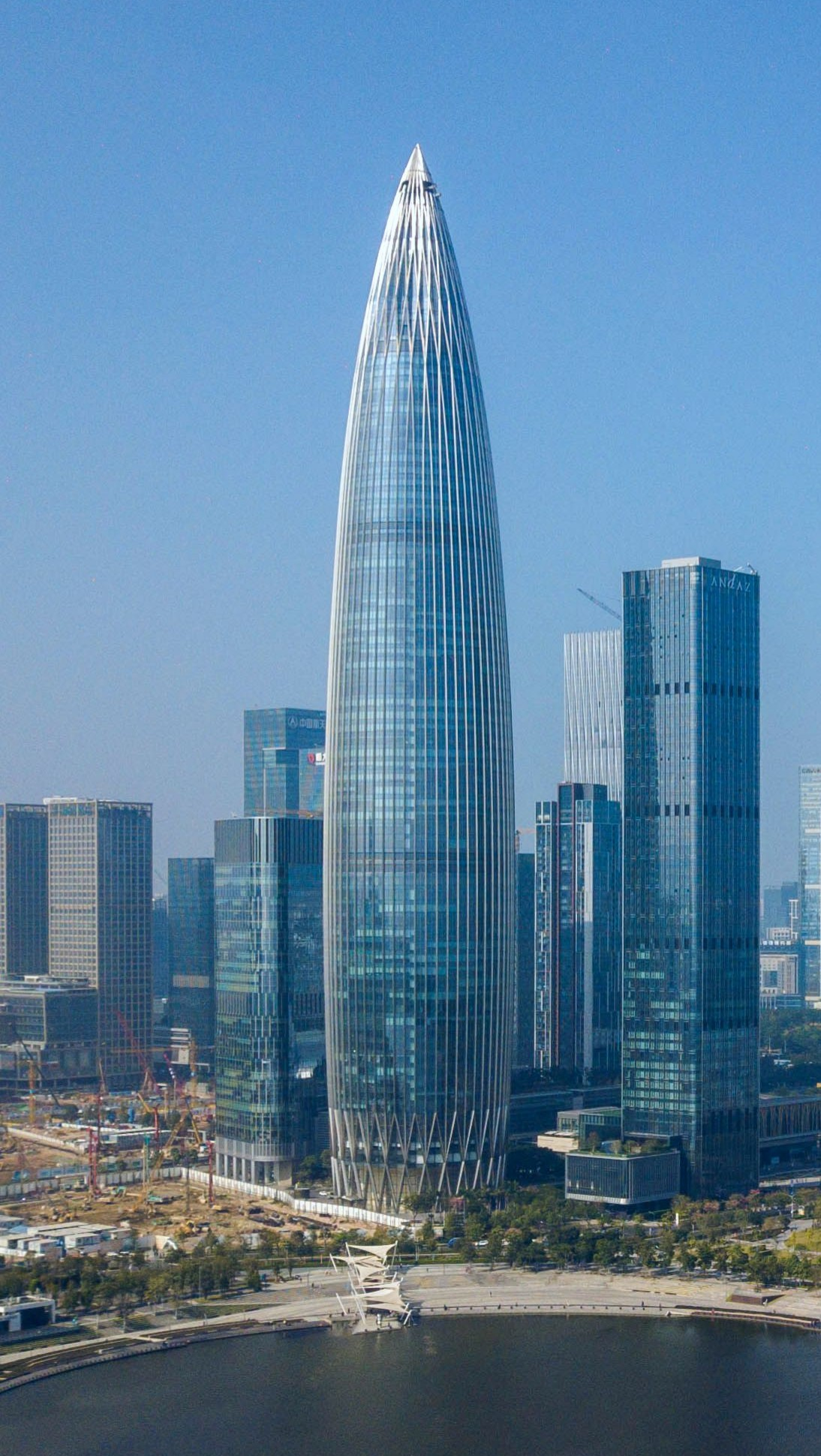
China Resources Headquarters in Shenzhen, China

23 Marina in Dubai, United Arab Emirates

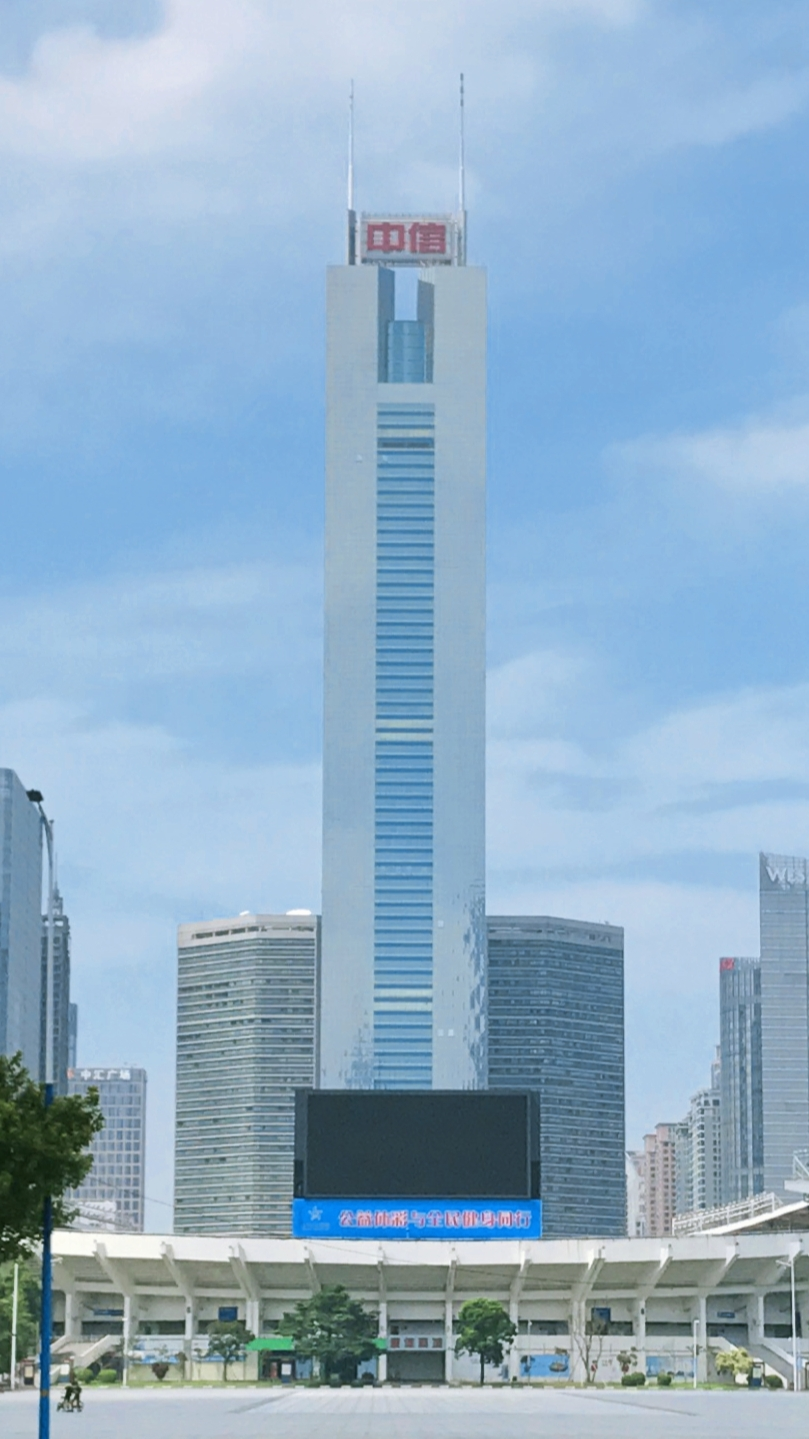
CITIC Plaza in Guangzhou, China

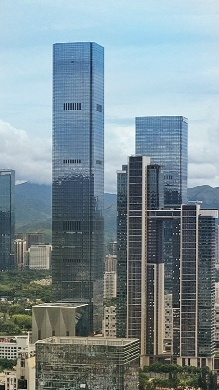
Shum Yip Upperhills Tower 1 in Shenzhen, China

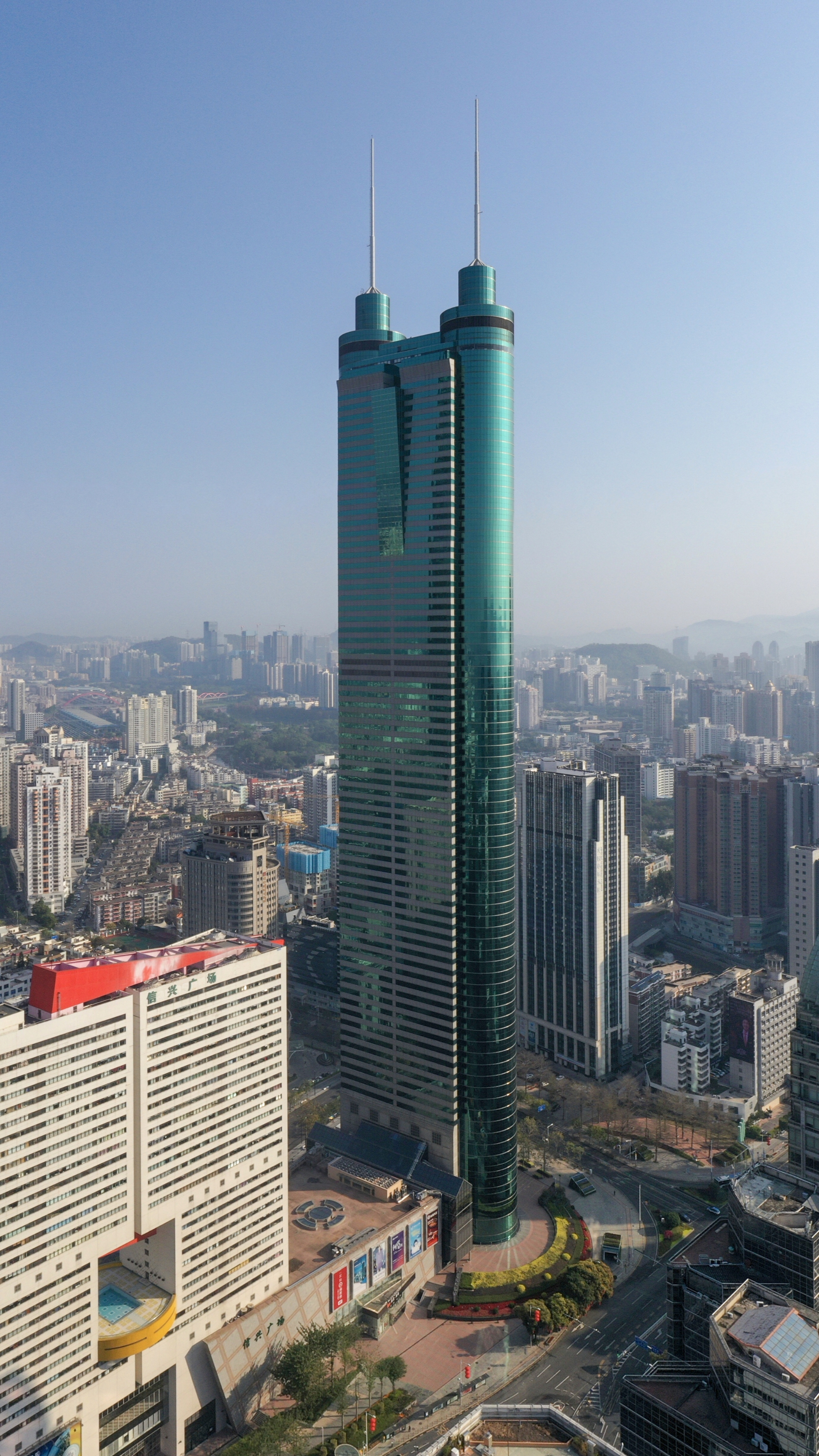
Shun Hing Square in Shenzhen, China

Autograph Tower in Jakarta, Indonesia, Tower the first supertall building in Indonesia and the Southern Hemisphere.

Elite Residence in Dubai, United Arab Emirates

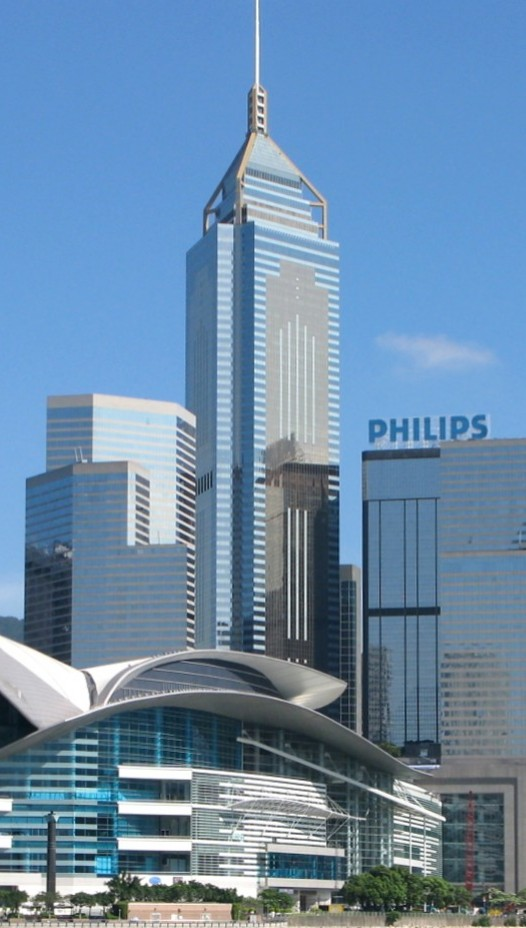
Central Plaza in Hong Kong

Address Boulevard in Dubai, United Arab Emirates

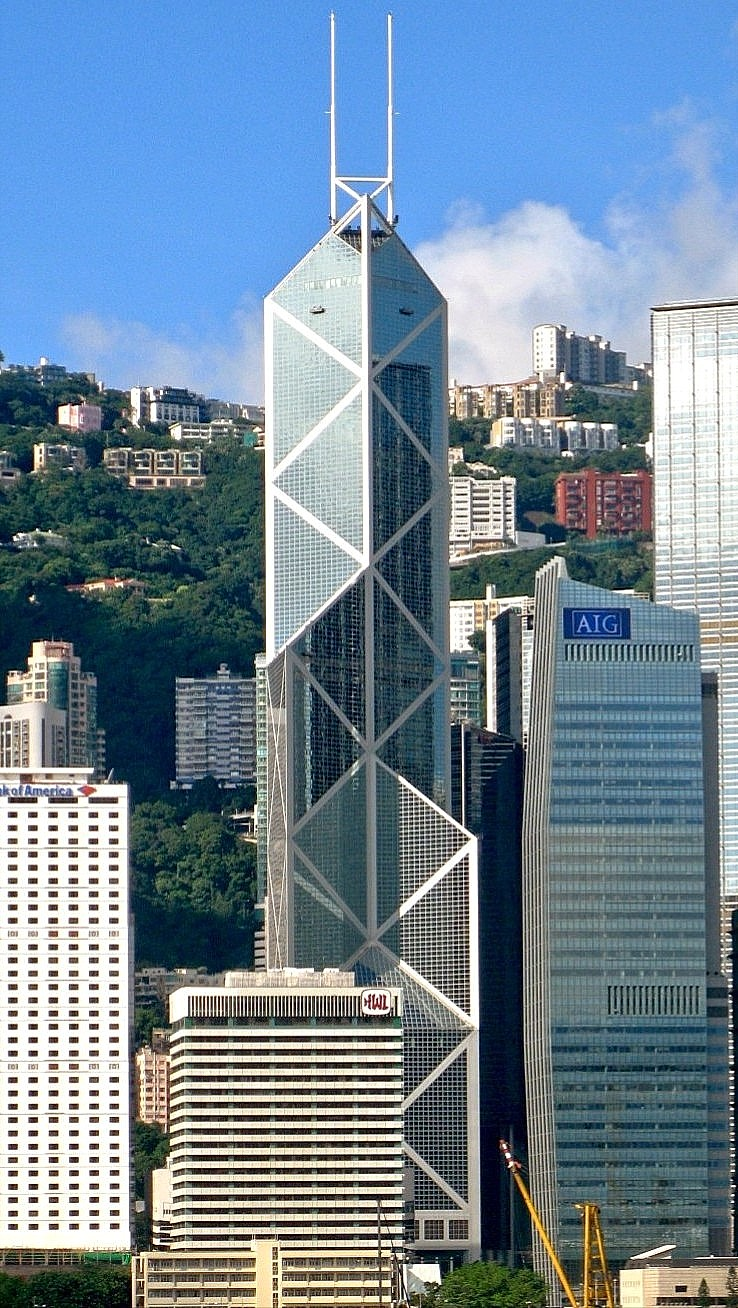
Bank of China Tower in Hong Kong

Almas Tower in Dubai, United Arab Emirates

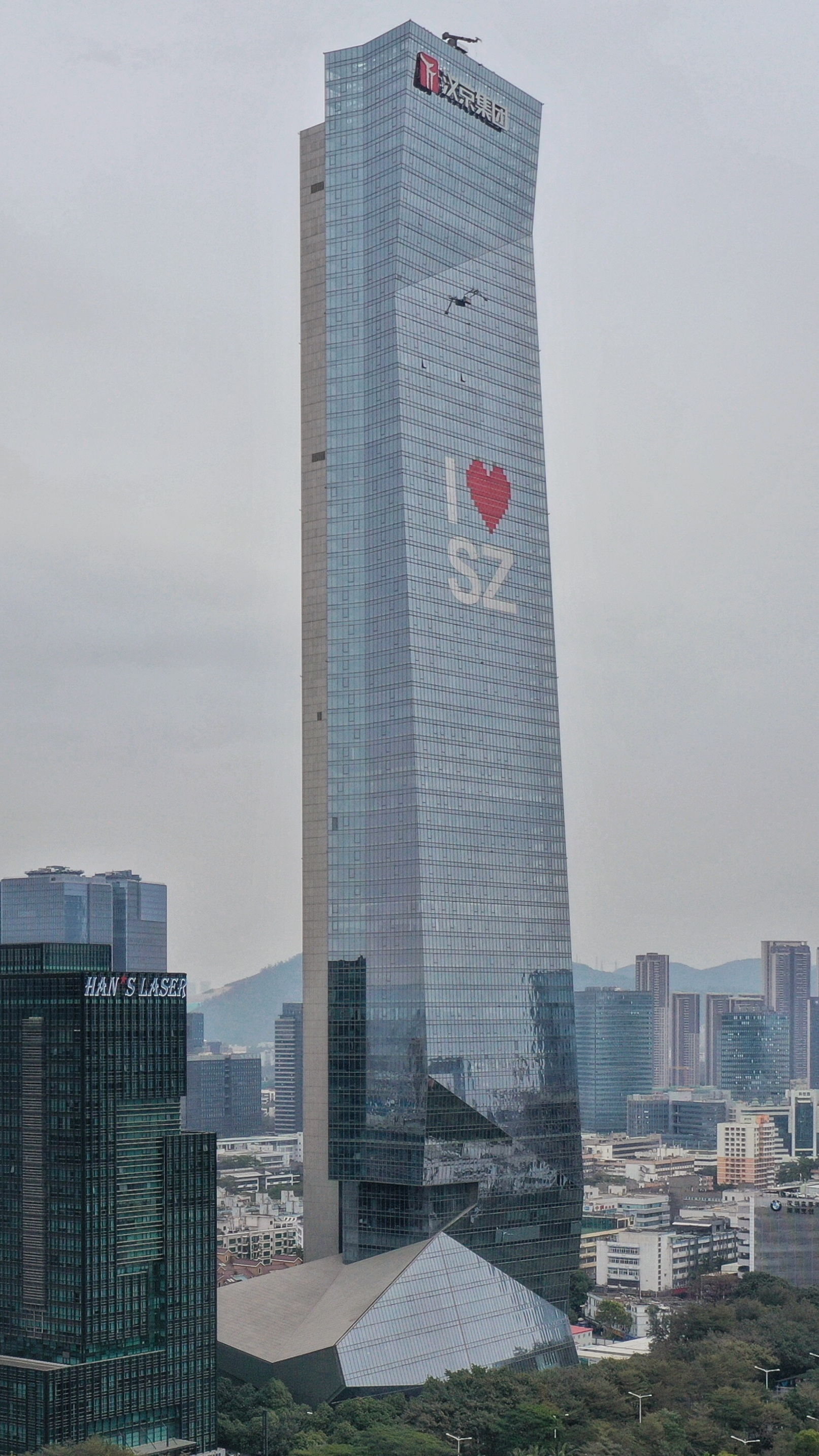
Hanking Center in Shenzhen, China

Emirates Towers in Dubai, United Arab Emirates

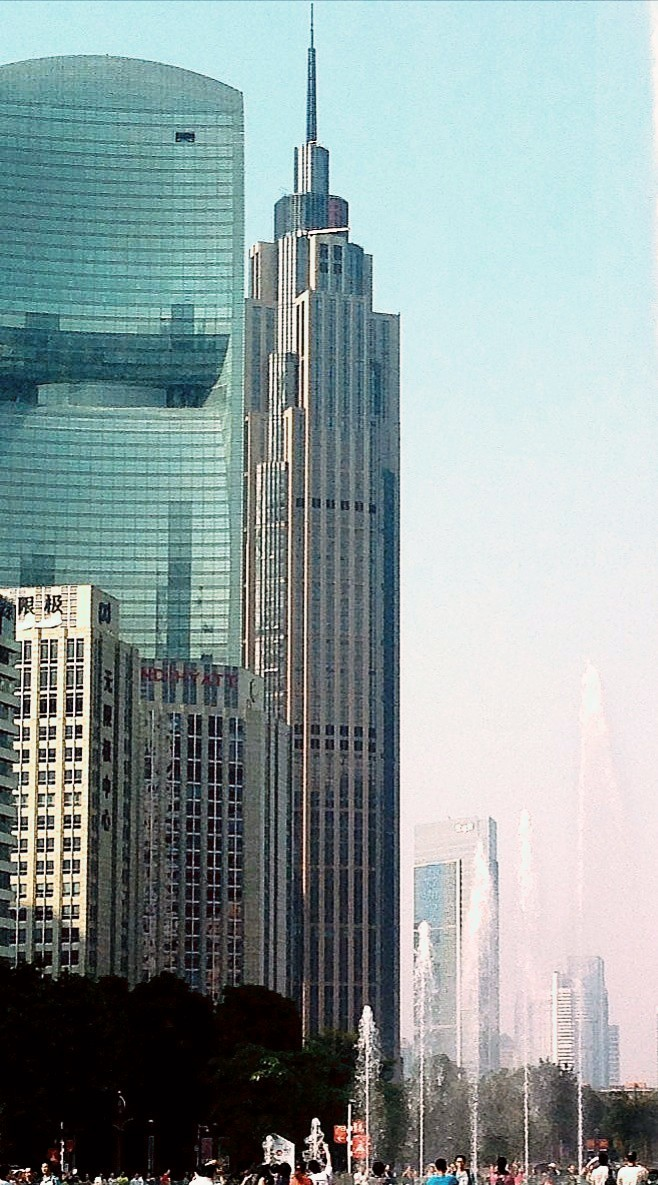
The Pinnacle in Guangzhou, China

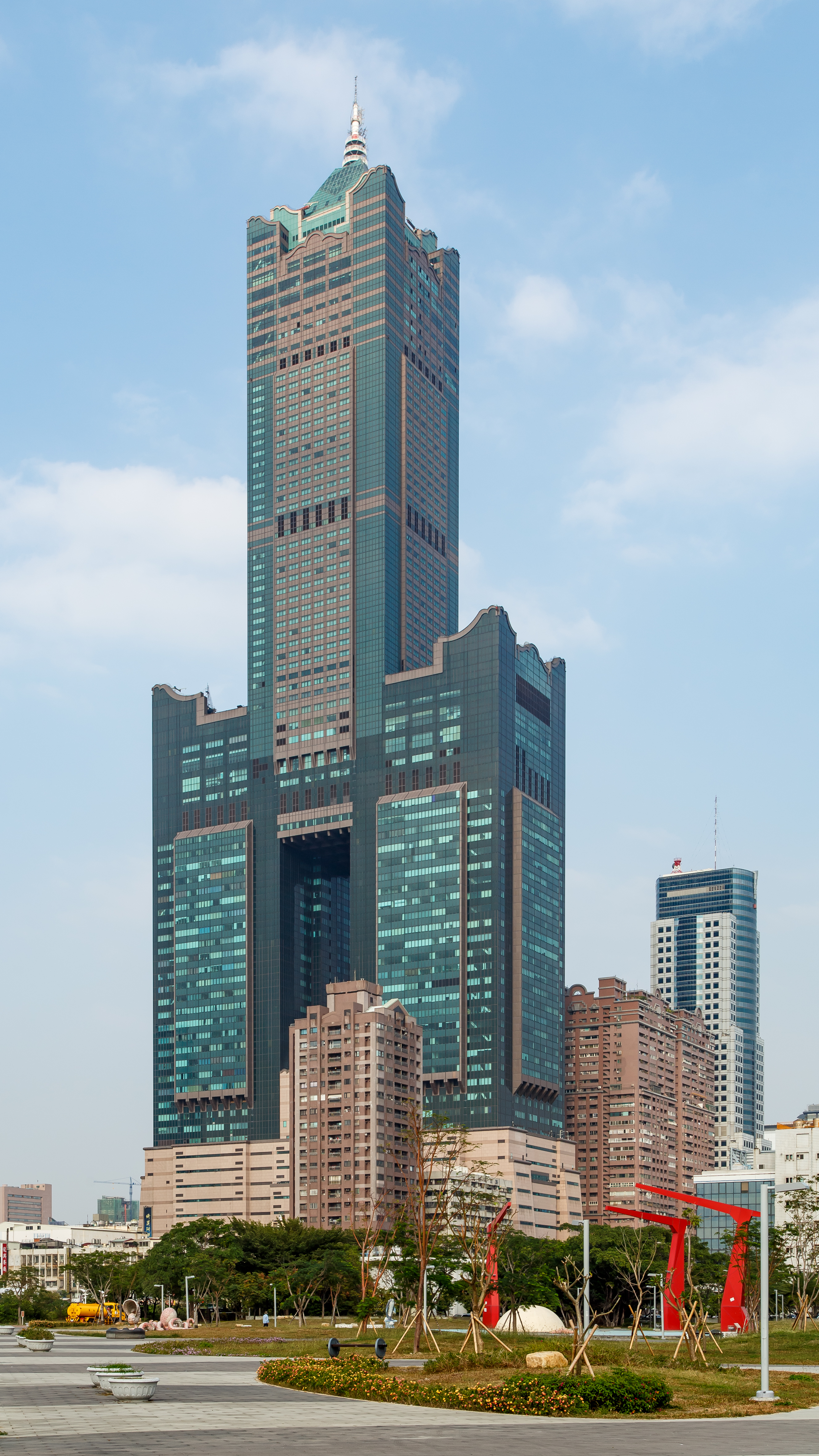
85 Sky Tower in Kaohsiung, Taiwan

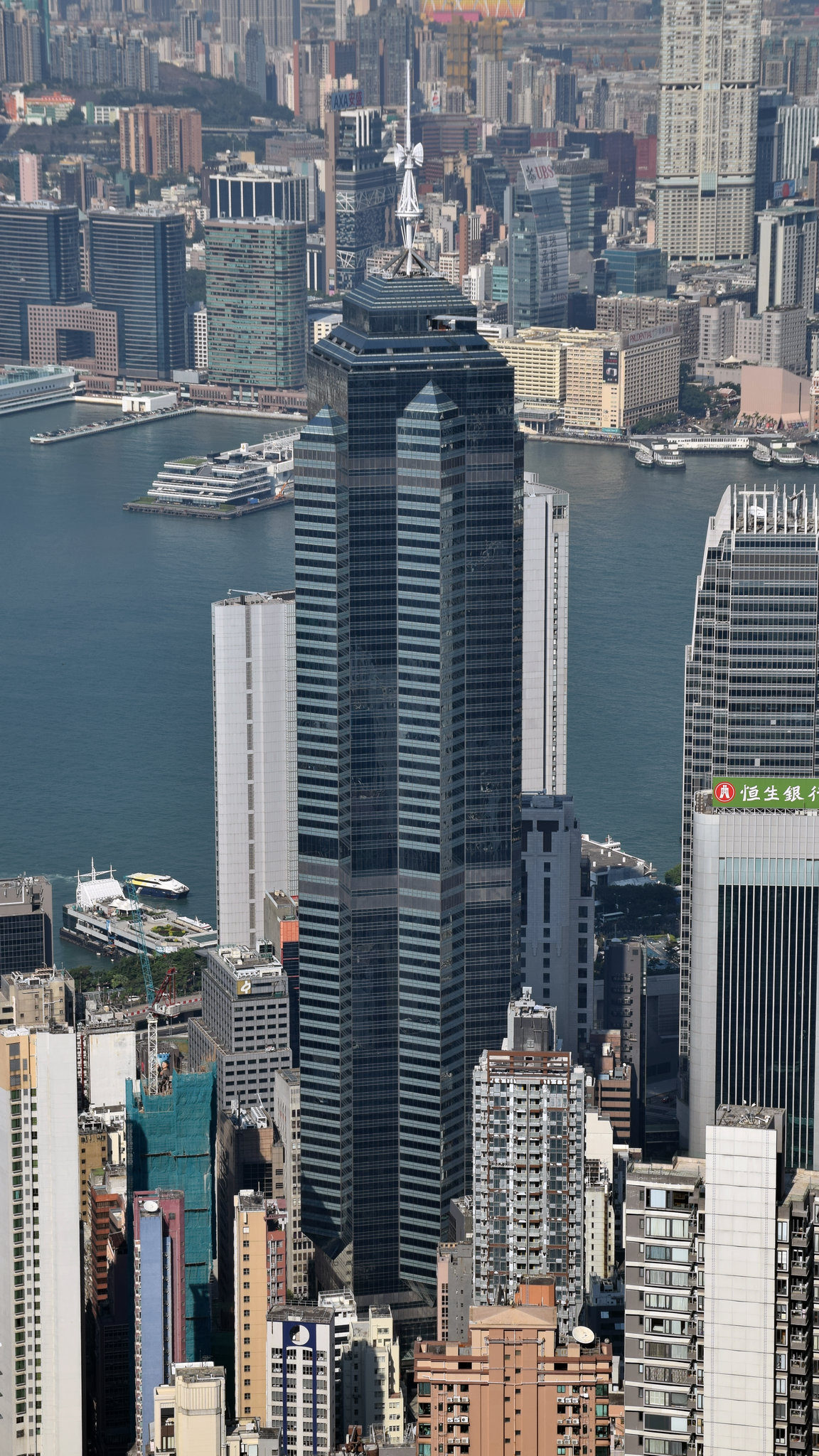
The Center in Hong Kong

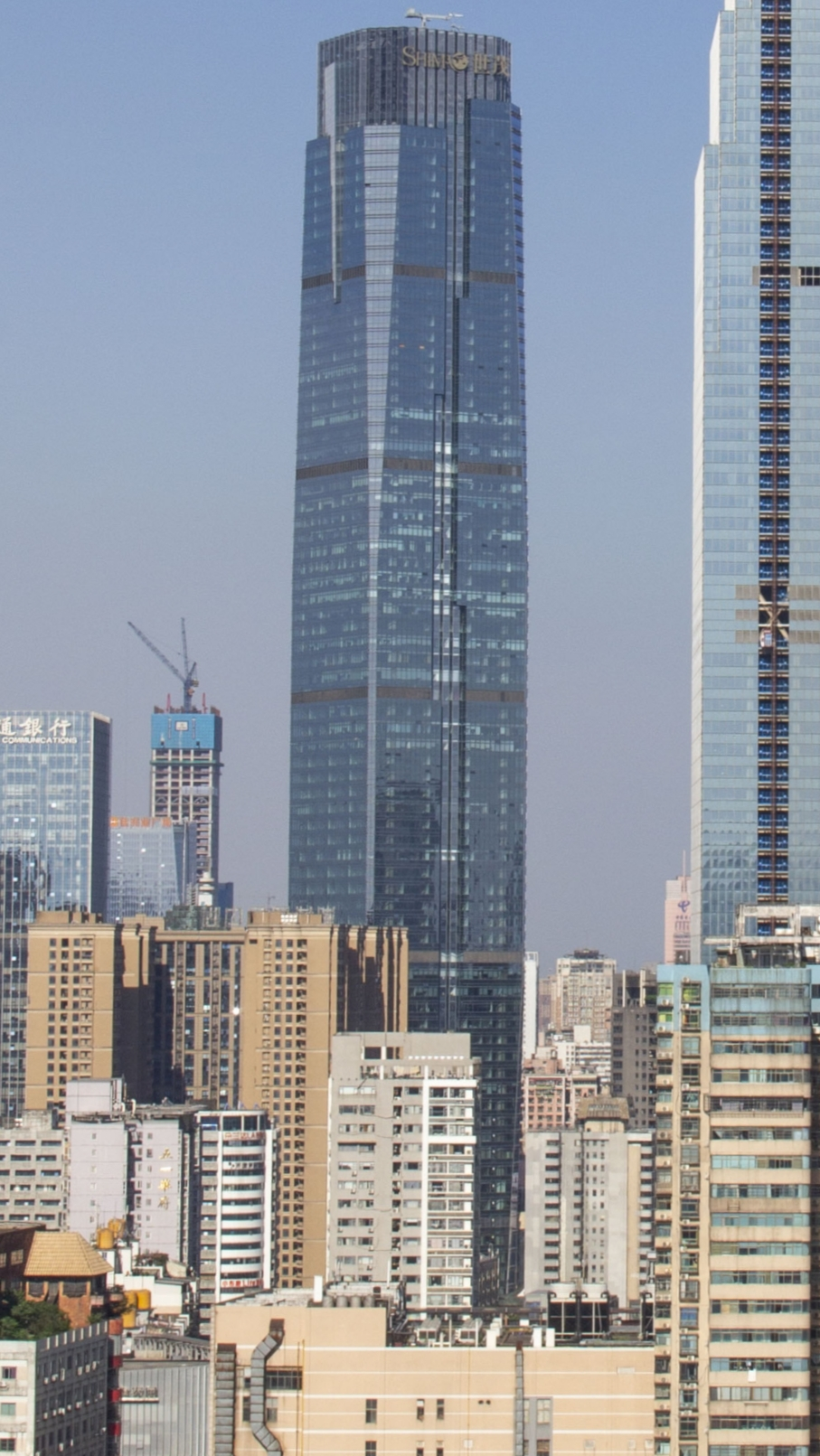
Shimao Global Financial Center in Changsha, China

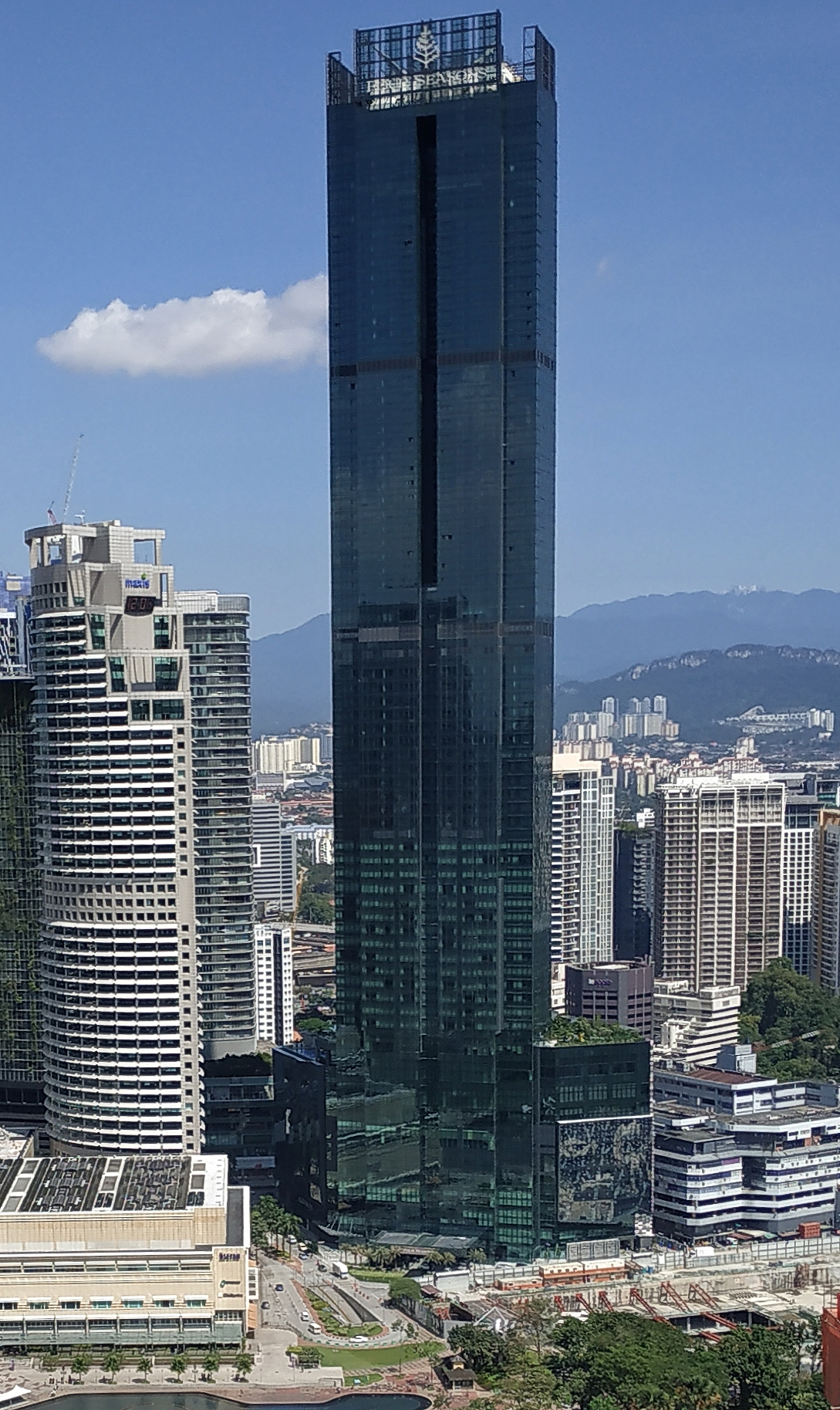
Four Seasons Place in Kuala Lumpur, Malaysia

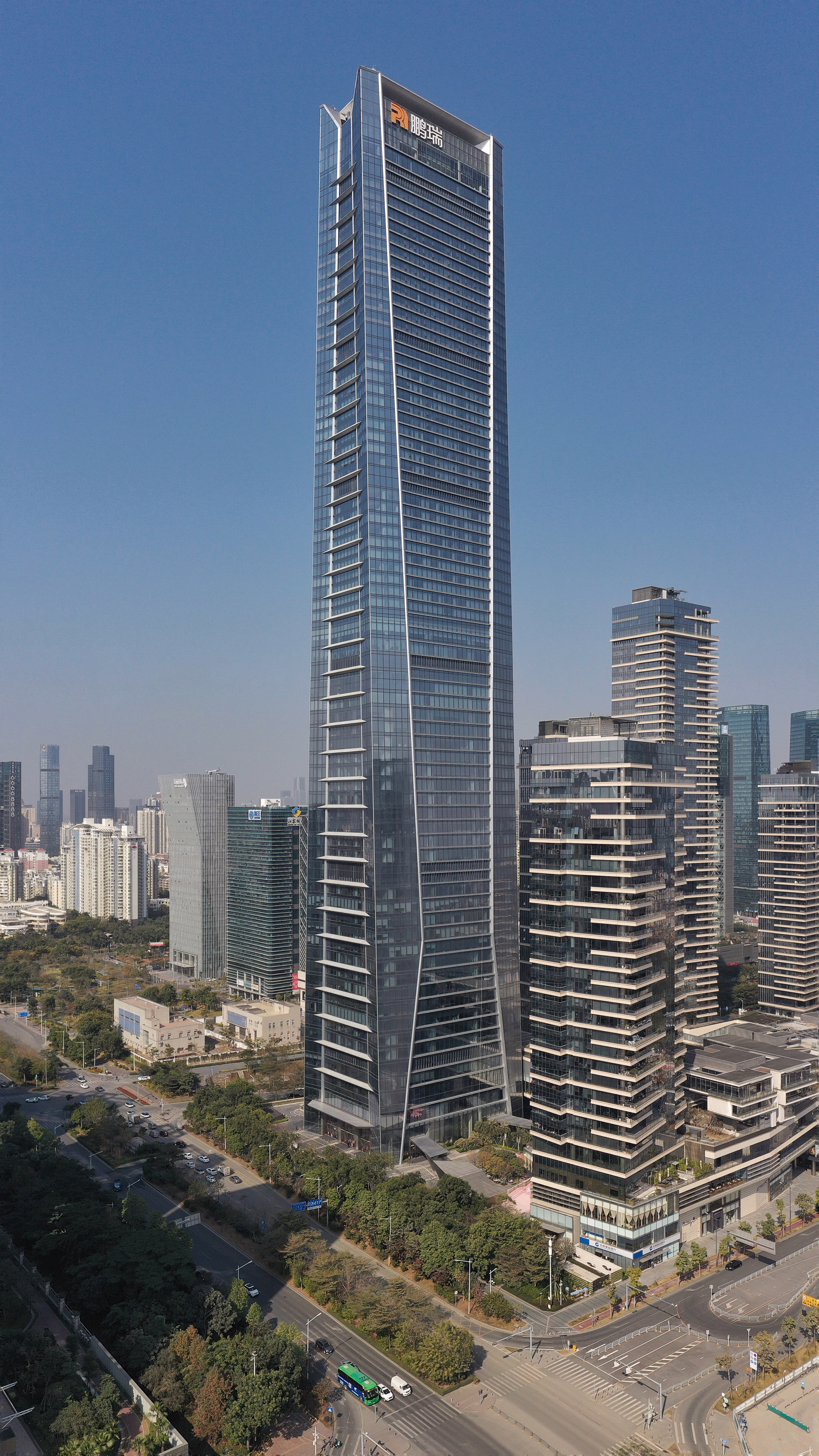
One Shenzhen Bay Tower 7 in Shenzhen, China

DAMAC Residenze in Dubai, United Arab Emirates

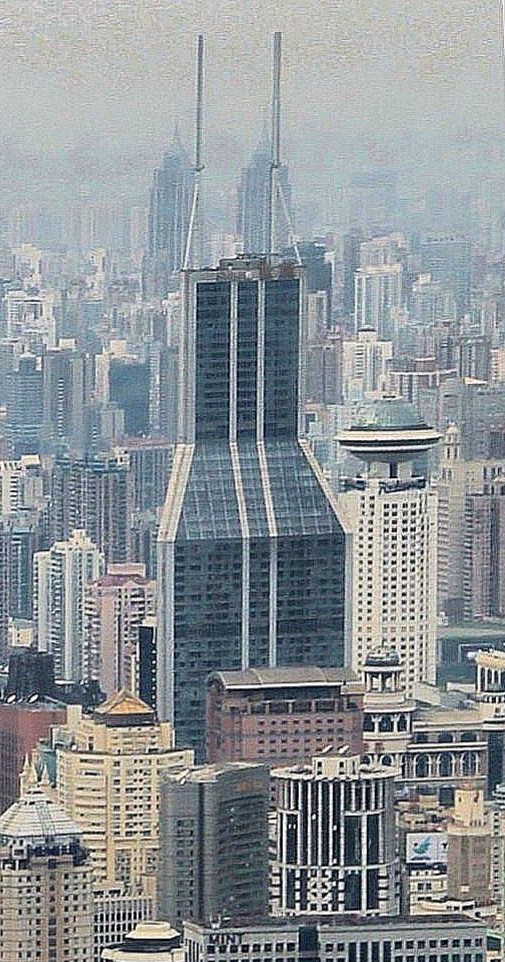
Shimao International Plaza in Shanghai, China

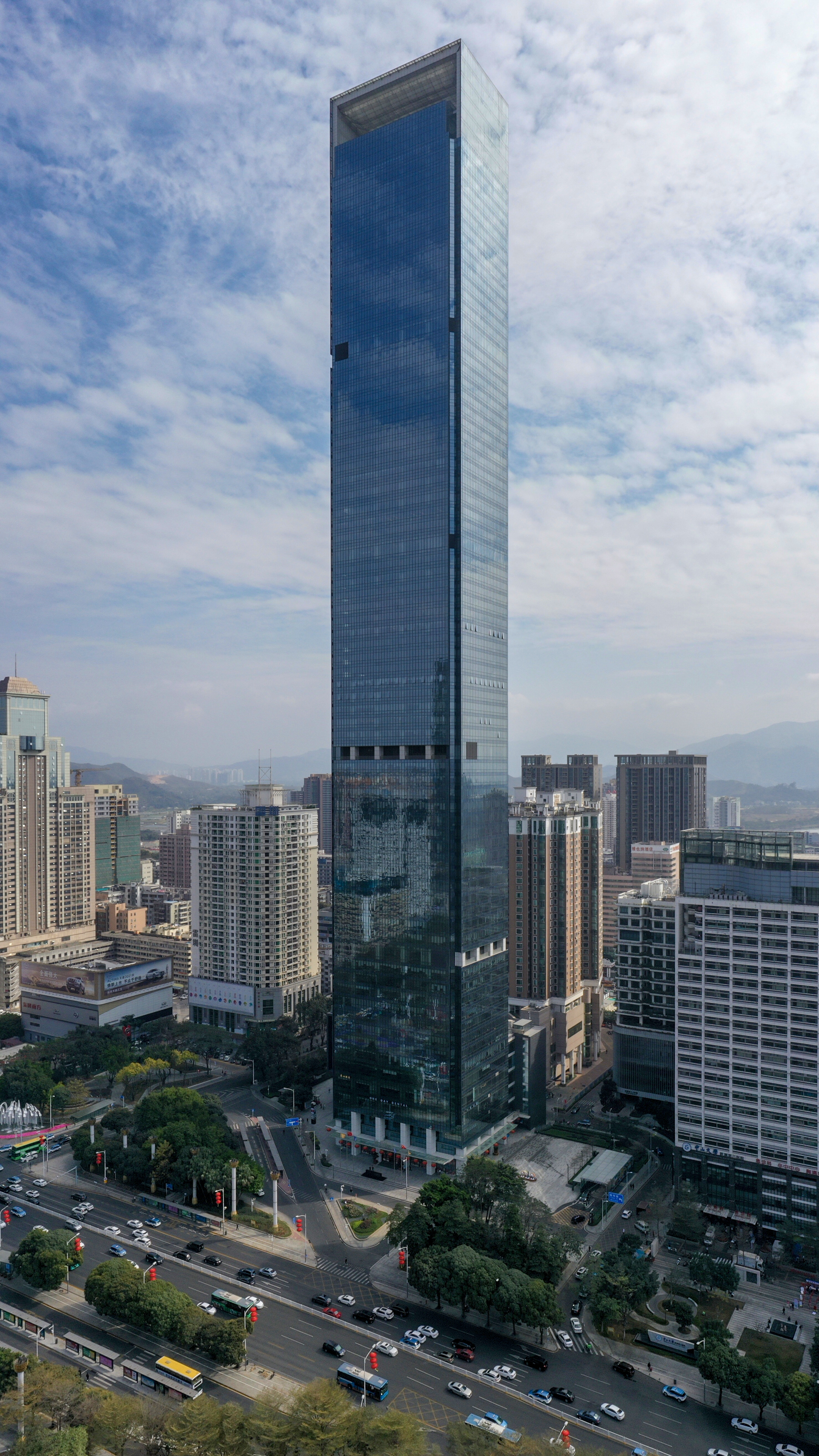
Hon Kwok City Center in Shenzhen, China

Al Yaqoub Tower in Dubai, United Arab Emirates

The Index in Dubai, United Arab Emirates

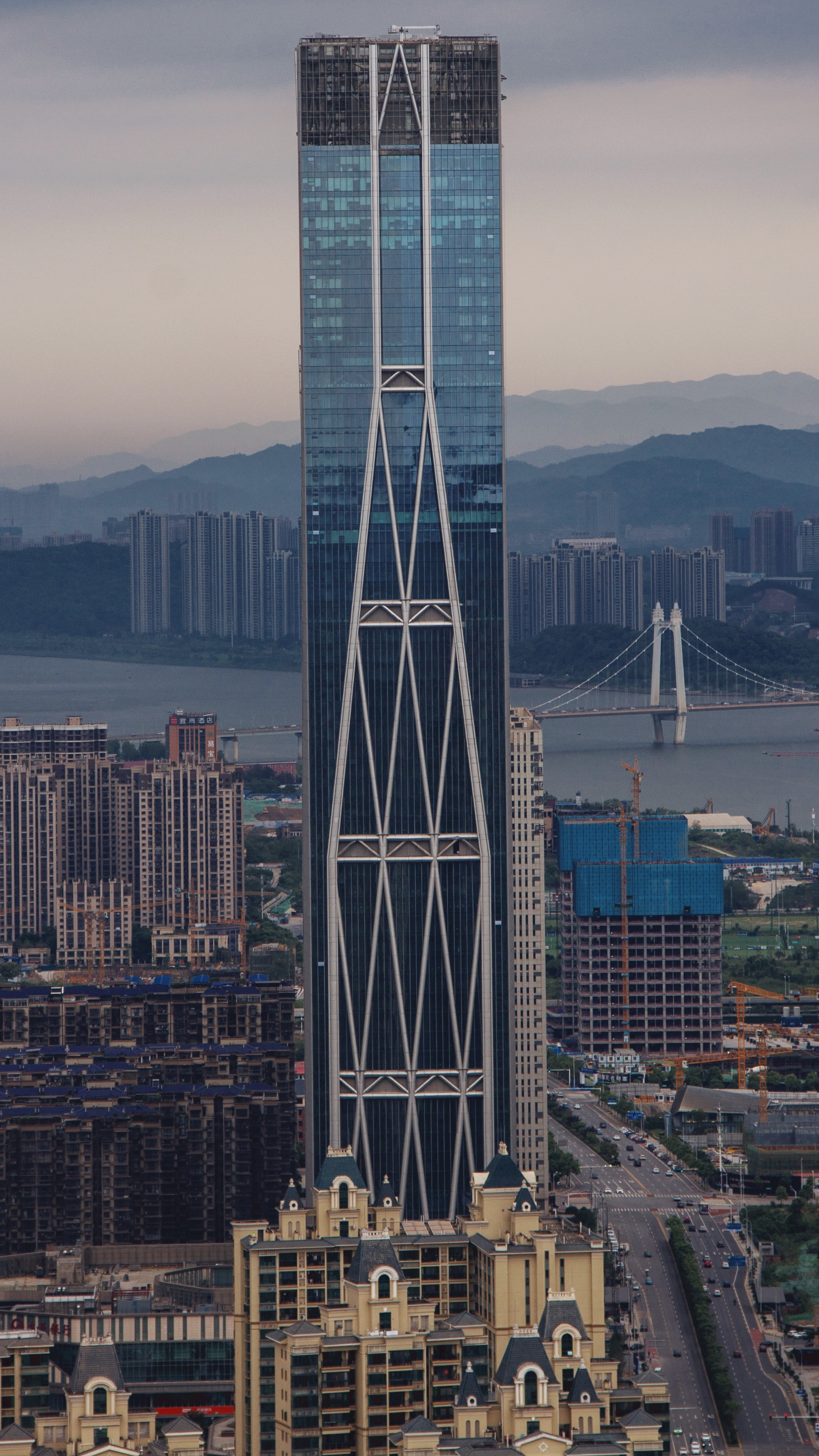
Xiangjiang Fortune Finance Center Tower 1 in Changsha, China

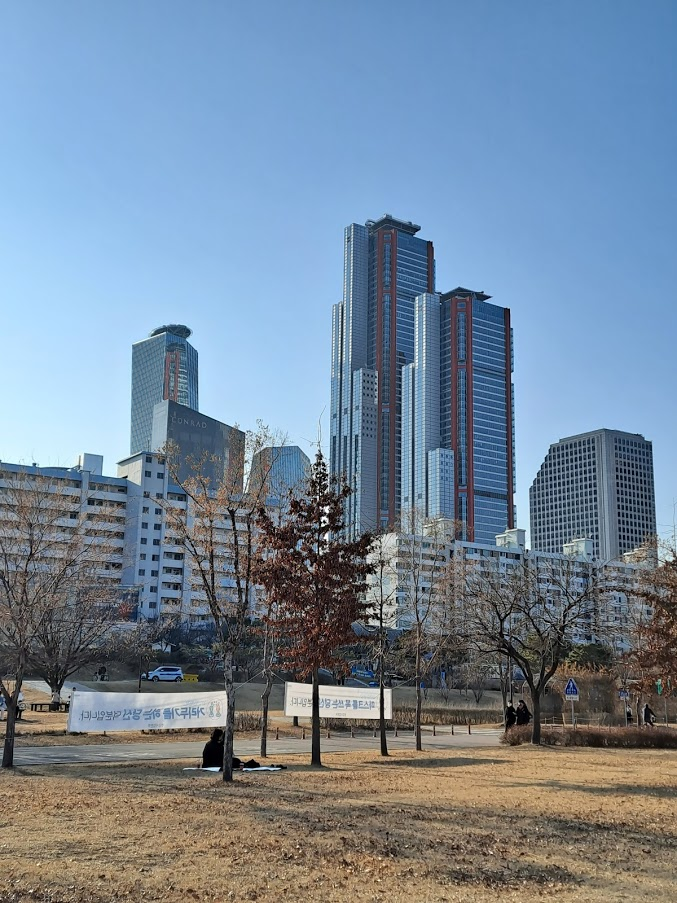
Parc1 Tower in Seoul, South Korea

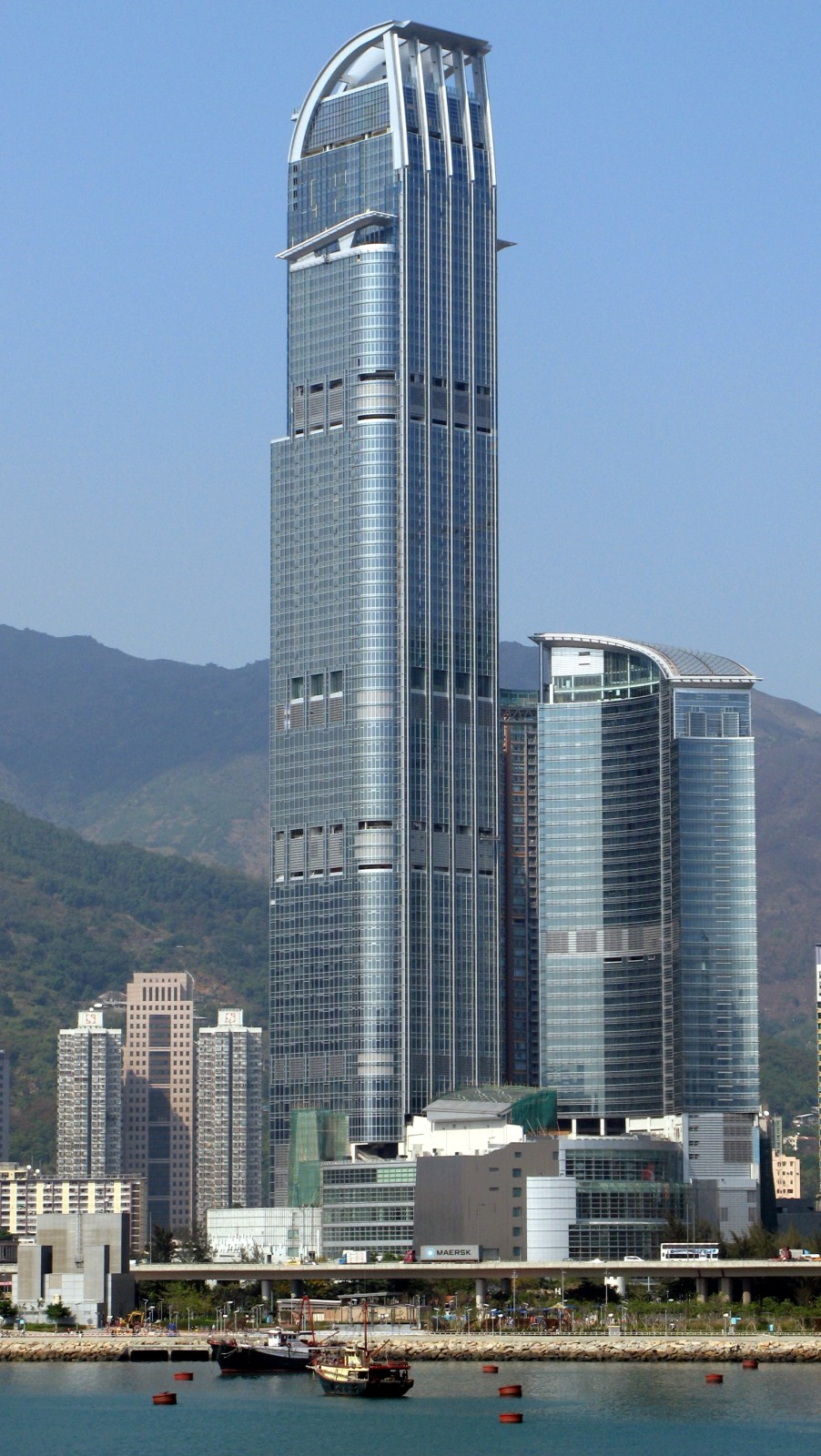
Nina Tower in Hong Kong

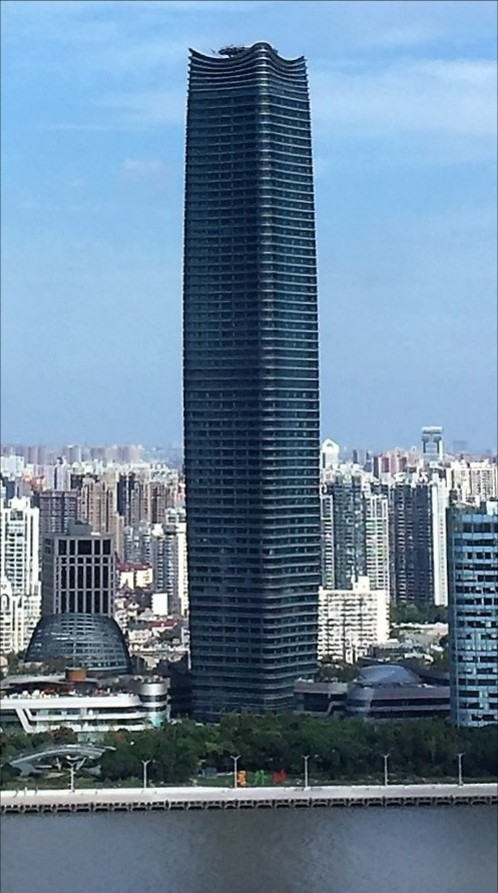
White Magnolia Plaza in Shanghai, China

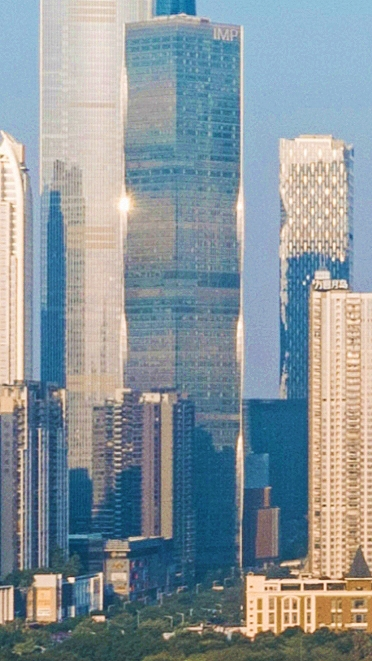
Global City Square in Guangzhou, China

Metrobank Center in Taguig, Manila, Philippines

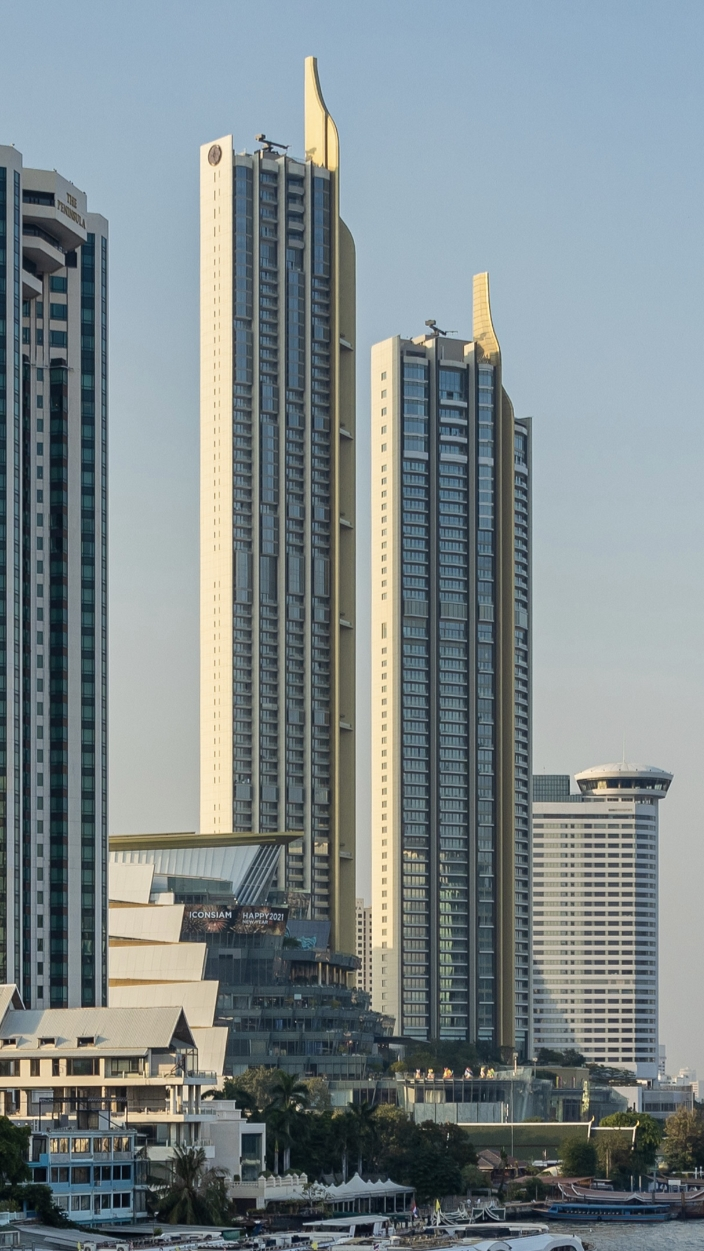
Magnolias Waterfront Residences in Bangkok, Thailand

Trump Tower in Makati, Manila, Philippines

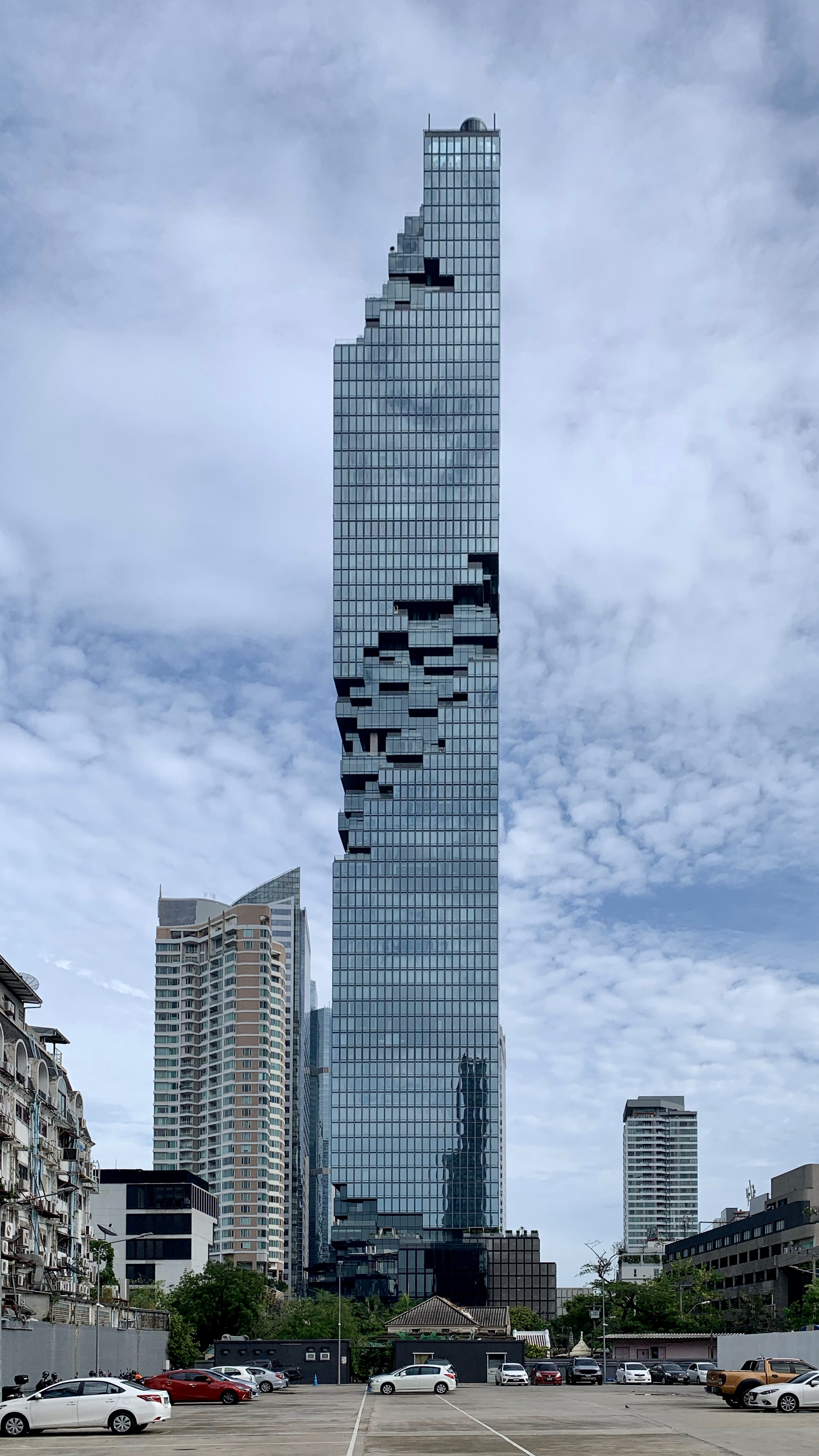
King Power Mahanakhon in Bangkok, Thailand

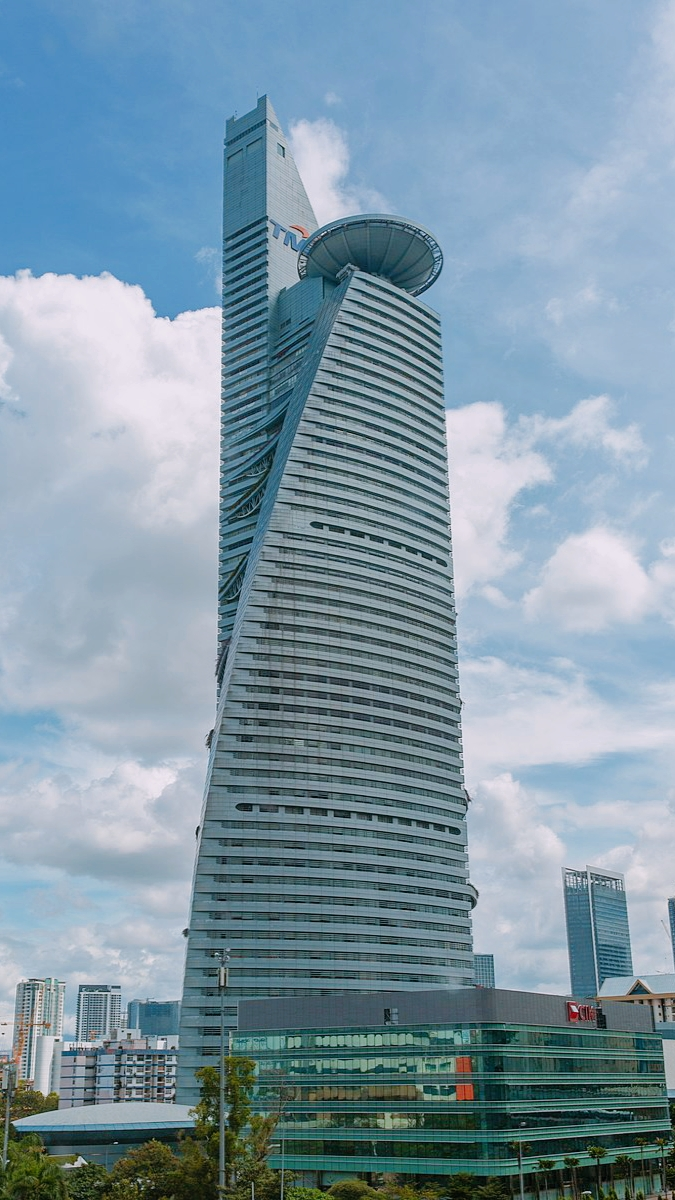
Telekom Tower in Kuala Lumpur, Malaysia

Ocean Heights in Dubai, United Arab Emirates

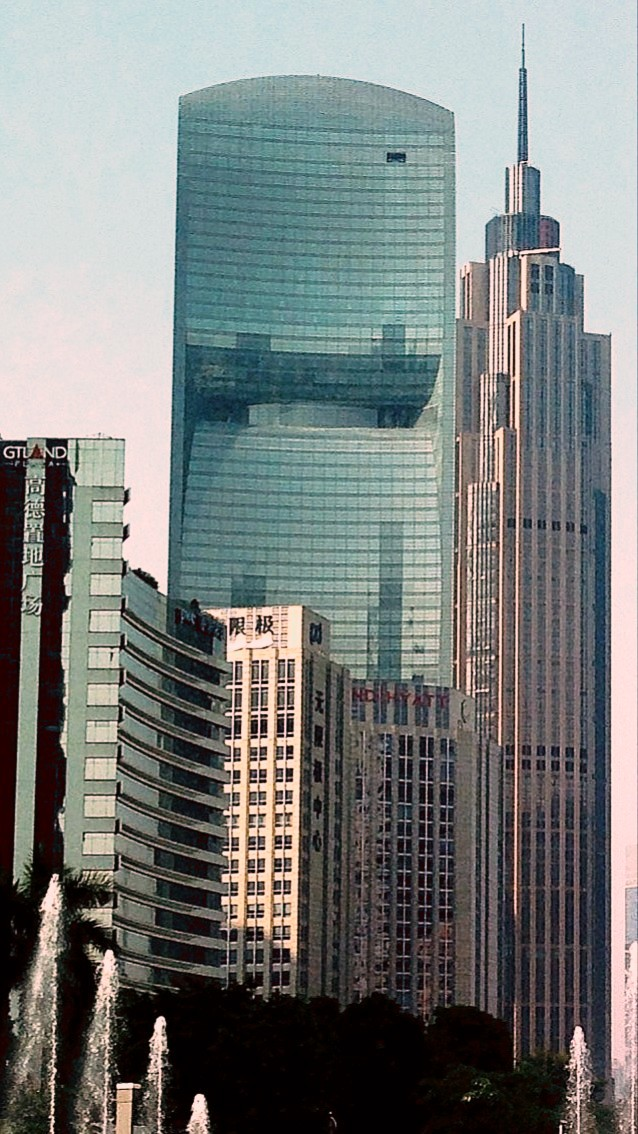
Pearl River Tower in Guangzhou, China

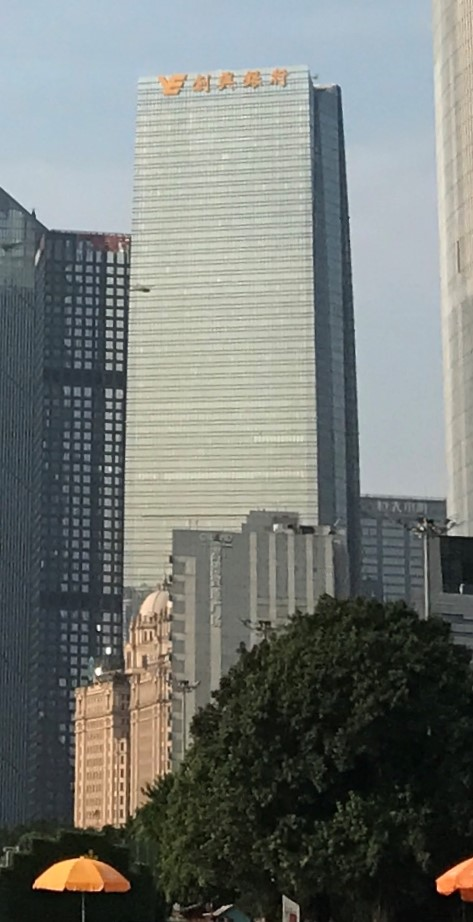
Fortune Center in Guangzhou, China

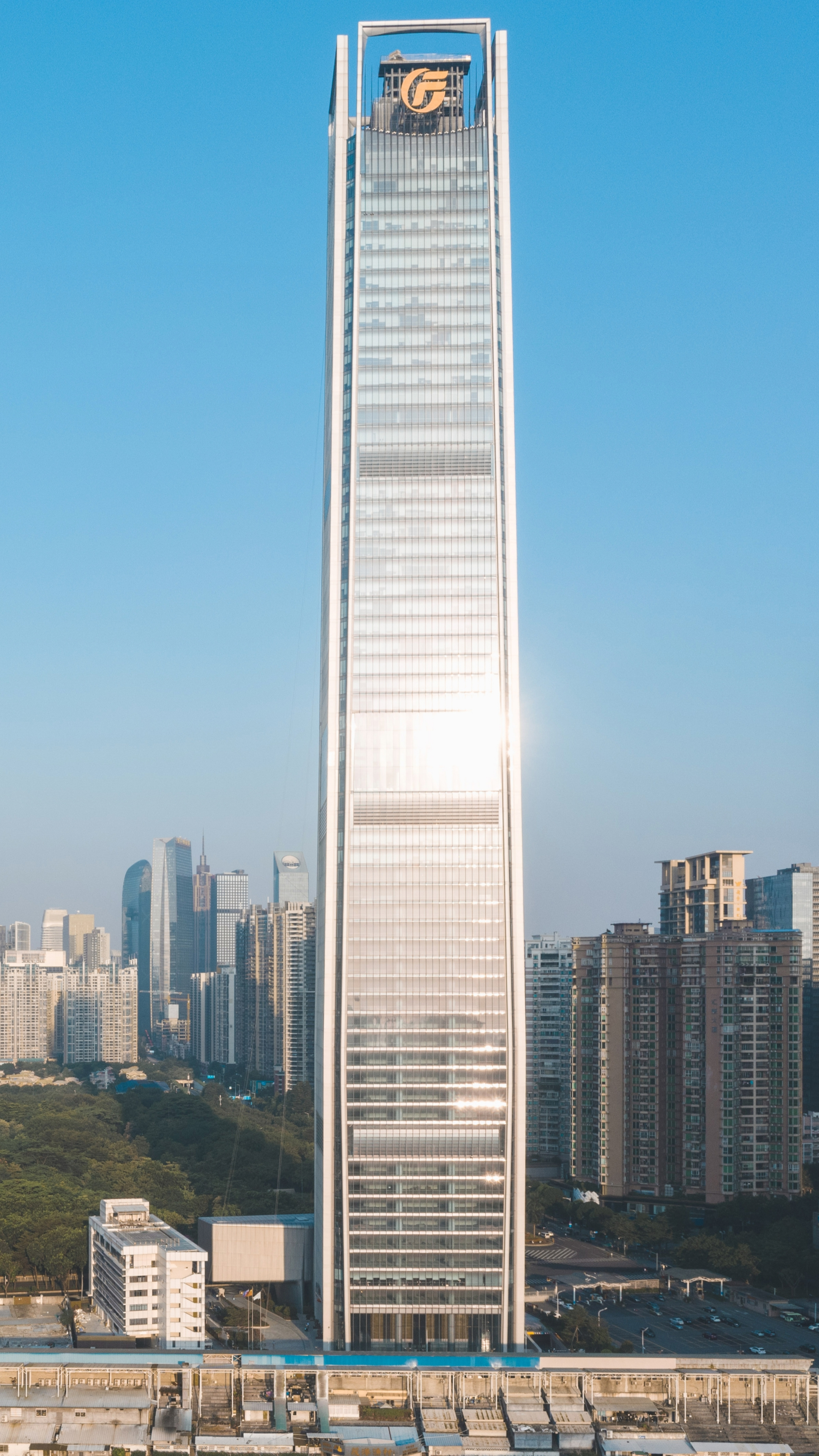
Guangfa Securities Headquarters in Guangzhou, China

Cayan Tower in Dubai, United Arab Emirates

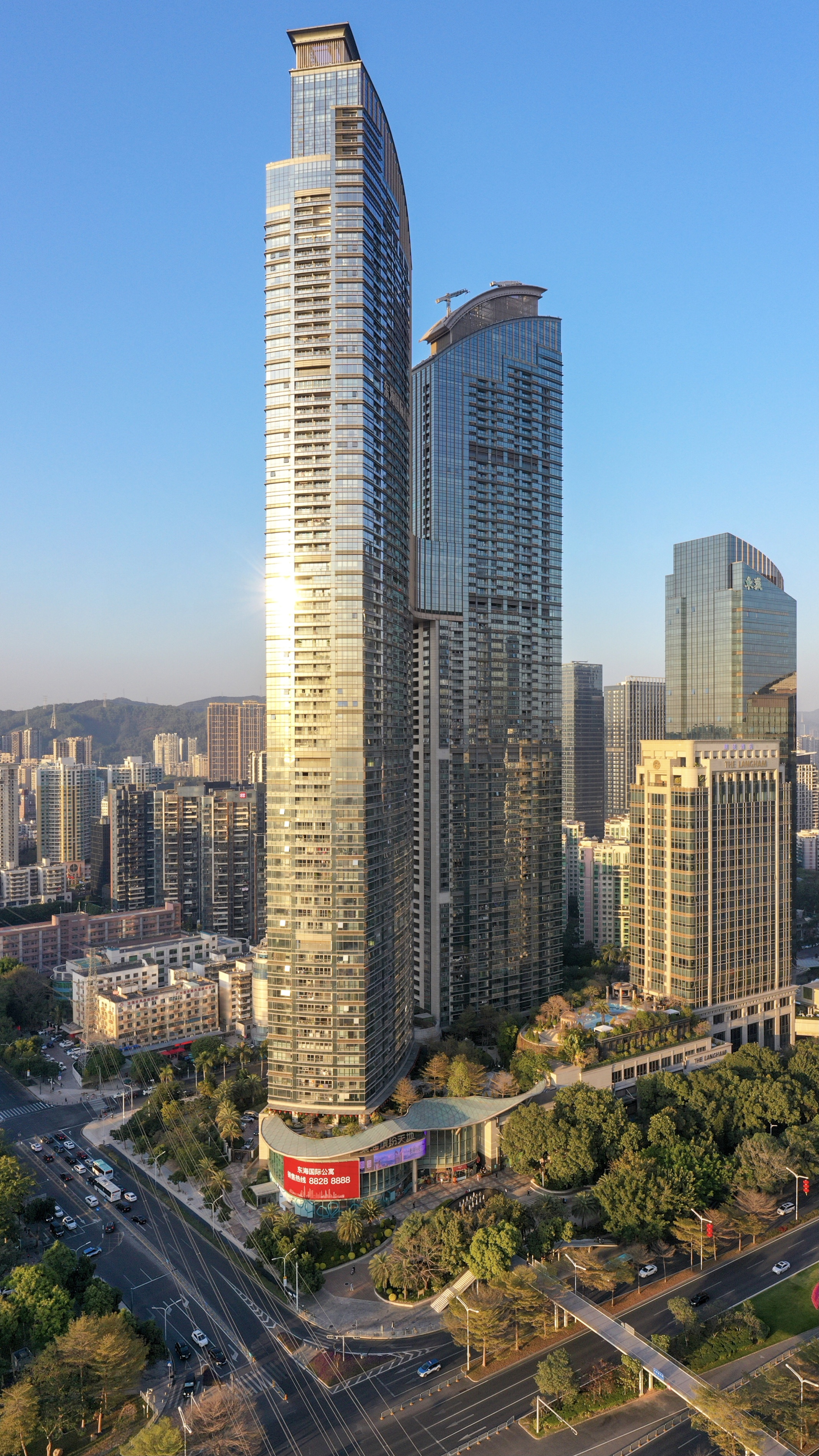
East Pacific Center Tower A in Shenzhen, China

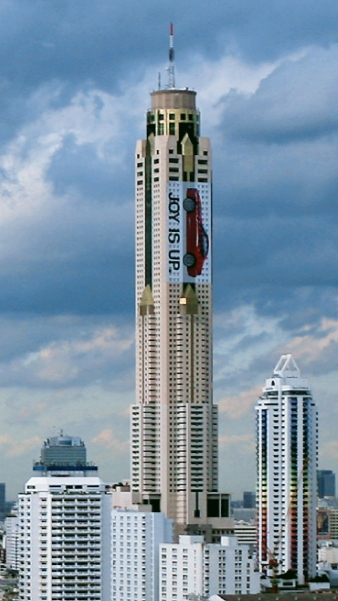
Baiyoke Tower II in Bangkok, Thailand

The Address Downtown Dubai in Dubai, United Arab Emirates

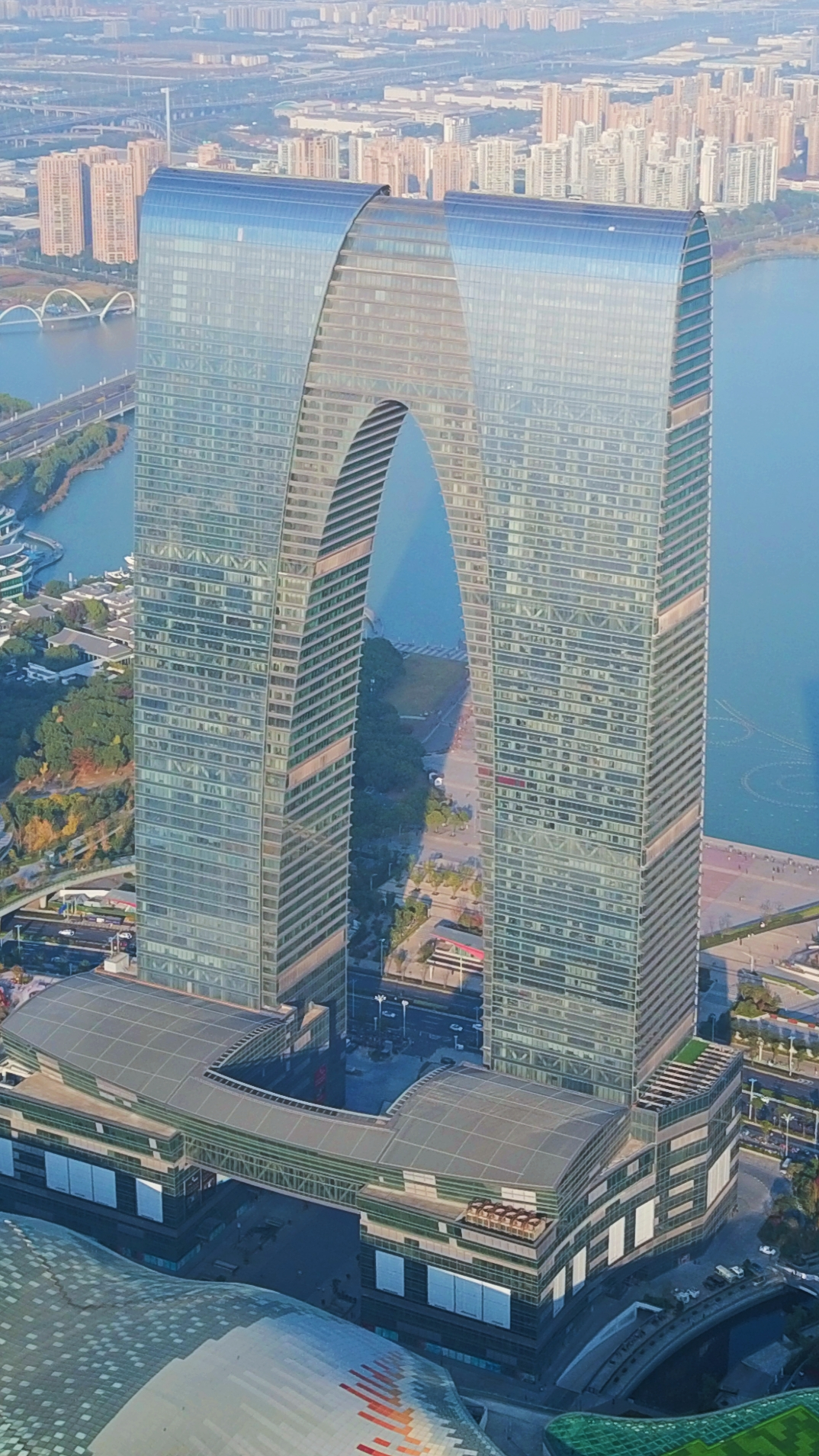
Gate to the East in Suzhou, China

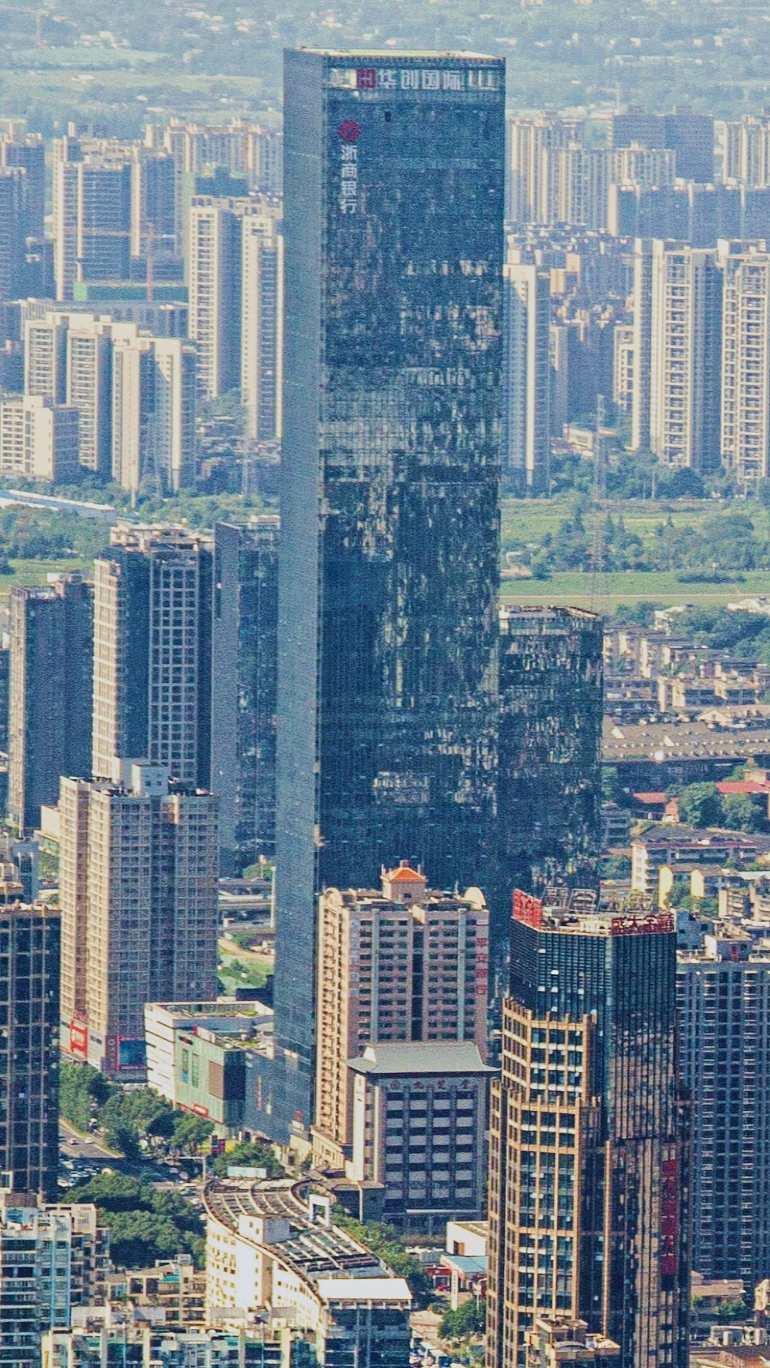
Huachuang International Plaza in Changsha, China

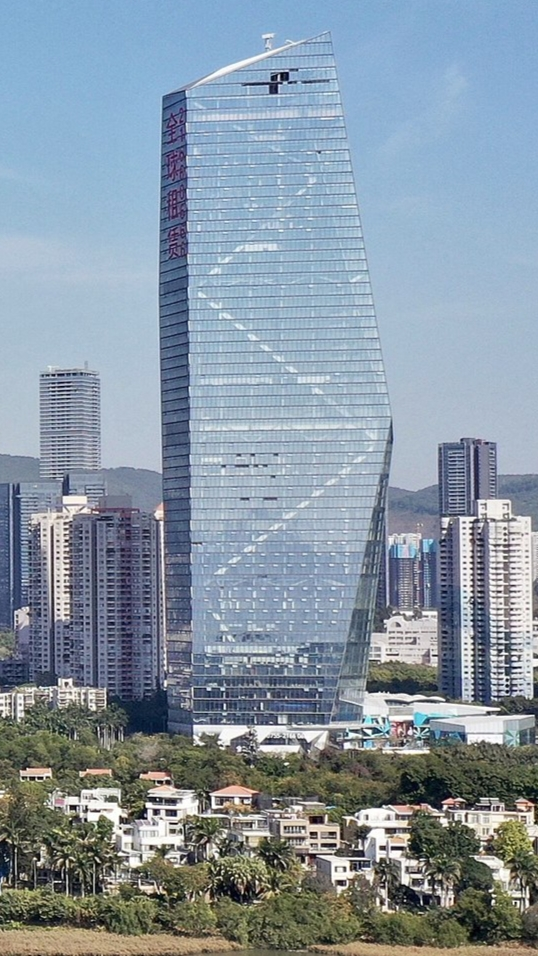
OCT Tower in Shenzhen, China

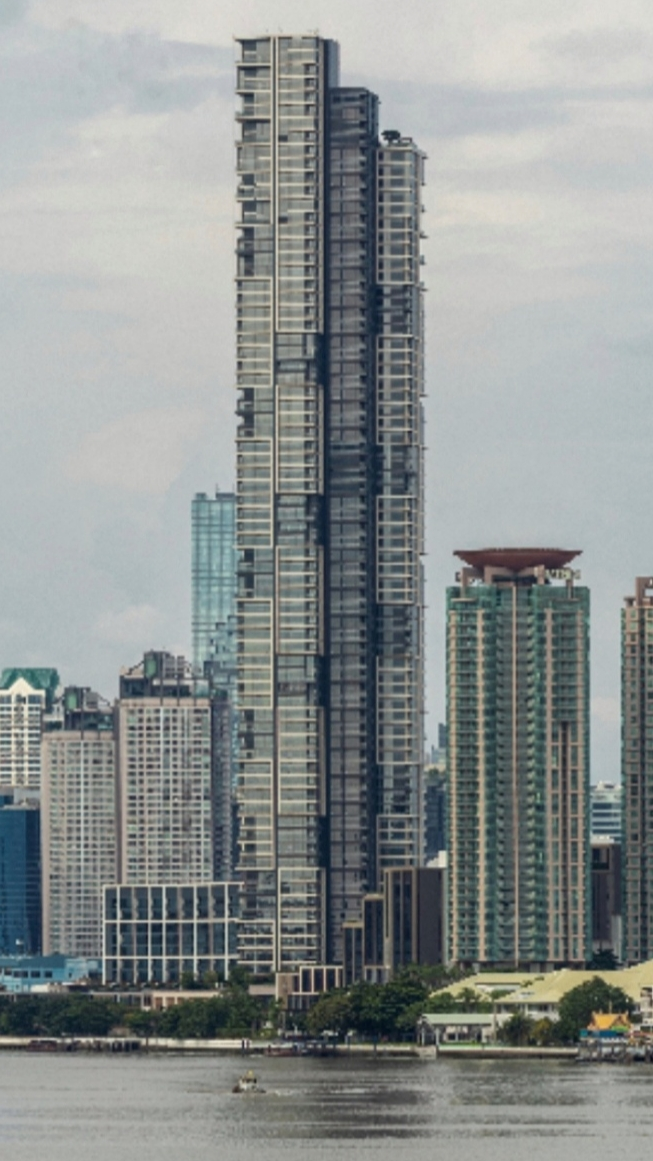
Four Seasons Private Residences in Bangkok, Thailand

== See also ==
- List of tallest buildings
- List of tallest residential buildings
- List of tallest buildings and structures
- List of tallest buildings in Europe
- List of tallest buildings in North America
- List of tallest buildings in South America
- List of tallest buildings in Africa
- List of tallest buildings in Oceania
- Asian regions
  - List of tallest structures in the Middle East
  - List of tallest structures in Central Asia
  - List of tallest buildings and structures in the Indian subcontinent
  - List of tallest buildings in Southeast Asia

== Notes ==
A. Destroyed buildings not included.
B. Topped out but not completed.
C. Topped out in 1992, when construction was halted. Work was restarted in 2008, exterior work completed in 2011; interior work ongoing.
