= Electronics Building =

Building in Shenzhen, Guangdong, China

- 电子大厦
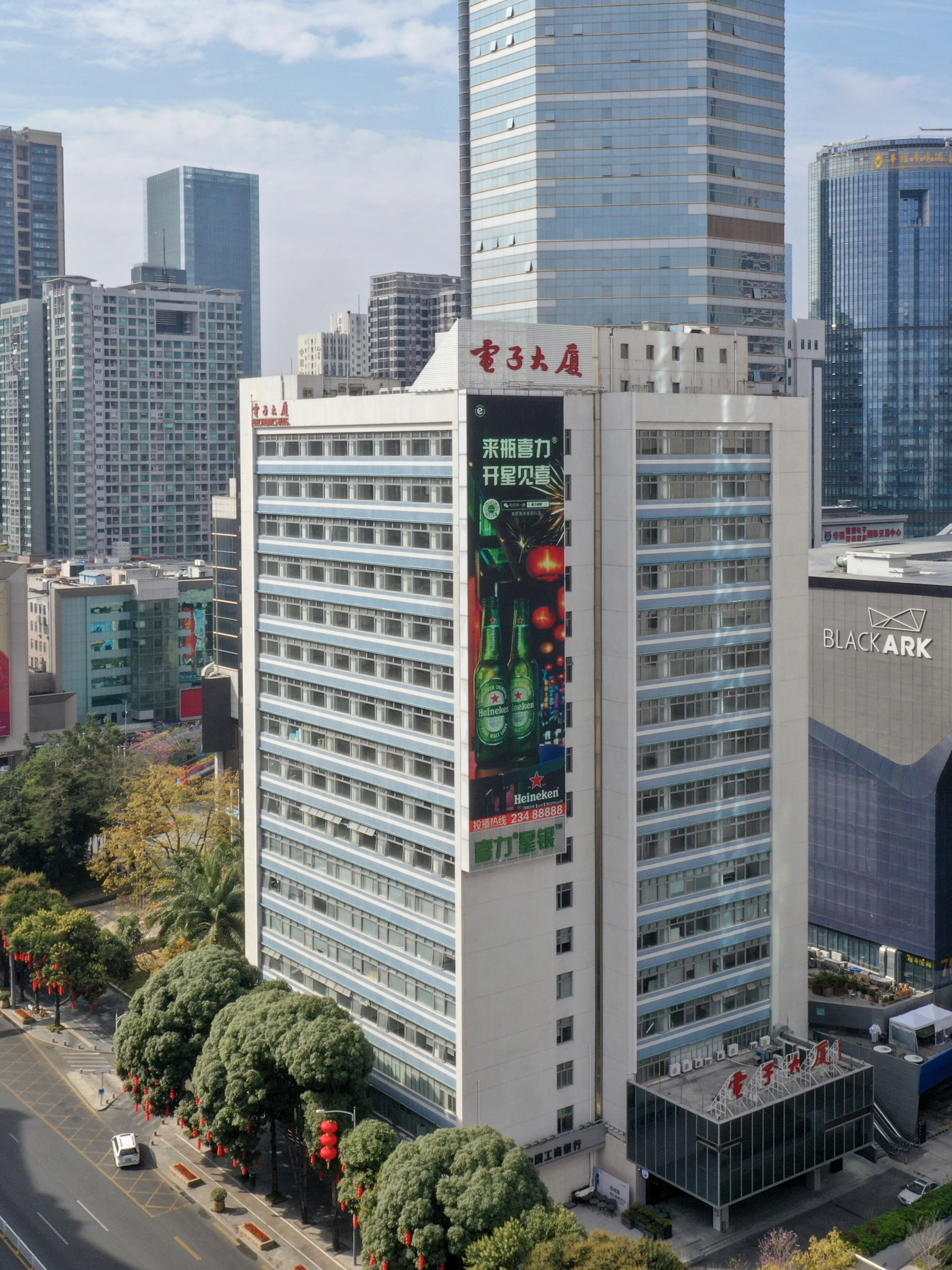
- The Guomao Building, Shenzhen in February 2021

General information
- Status: Completed
- Type: Office
- Location: 2070 Shennan Middle Road, Futian District, Shenzhen, Guangdong, China
- Construction started: 1981
- Completed: 1982

Height
- Architectural: 70 m (229.7 ft)

Technical details
- Floor count: 20

The Electronics Building (Chinese: 电子大厦) is a historic building in Shenzhen, China, located in Shennan Middle Road. The building was started in 1981 and completed in August the following year.

It is the first-generation headquarters building of Shenzhen CEC Group (the branch of China Electronics Corporation in Shenzhen) and was the first high-rise building after Shenzhen was established. It is named after the electronics industry.

From the 1980s to the early 1990s, it was a local landmark. A large electronics industry emerged surrounding the building. The building has also become the "first street of China's electronics".

== See also ==
- Shenzhen speed
- Shun Hing Square
- SEG Plaza
- Guomao Building
- List of tallest buildings in Shenzhen
