= Jinlihua Plaza =

Skyscraper in Shenzhen, China

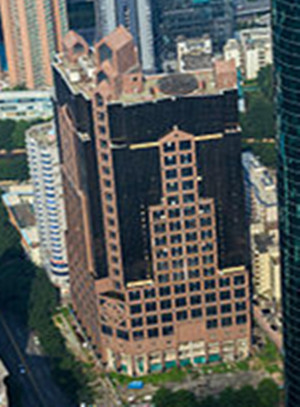
Jinlihua Plaza as viewed from KK100 Observatory

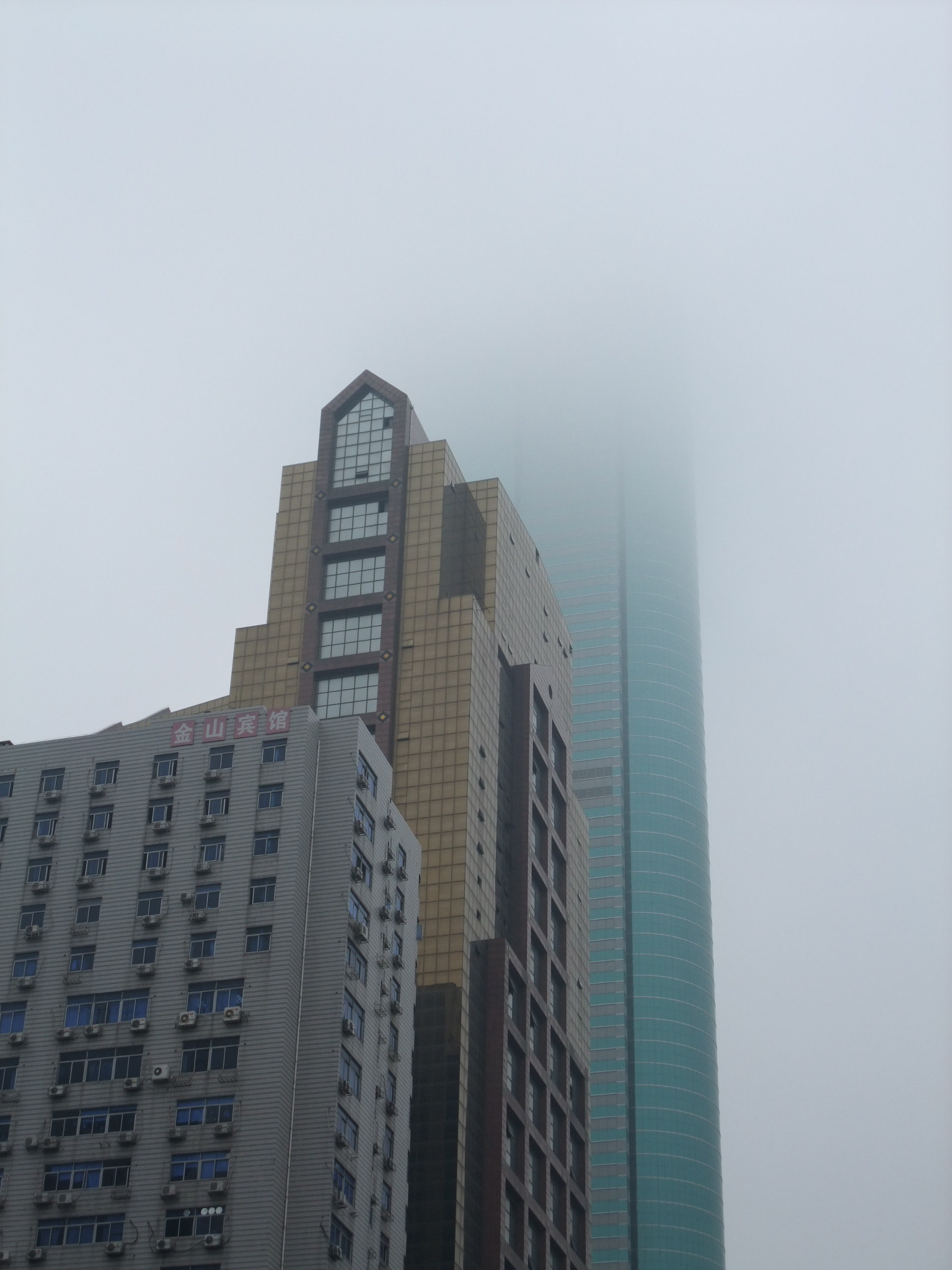
Jinlihua Plaza (center) and Shun Hing Square

Jinlihua Plaza (Chinese: 金利华大厦 is an unfinished skyscraper in Luohu, Shenzhen, China. It is located opposite of Shun Hing Square and has a floor area of 78,536 m^{2}. The building was abandoned prior to completion in 1999 after contractual and financial reasons.

== See also ==
- Zhengshun Plaza
