= Shenzhen Metro Che Kung Temple Hub =

Skyscraper in Shenzhen, Guangdong, China

- 深铁置业大厦
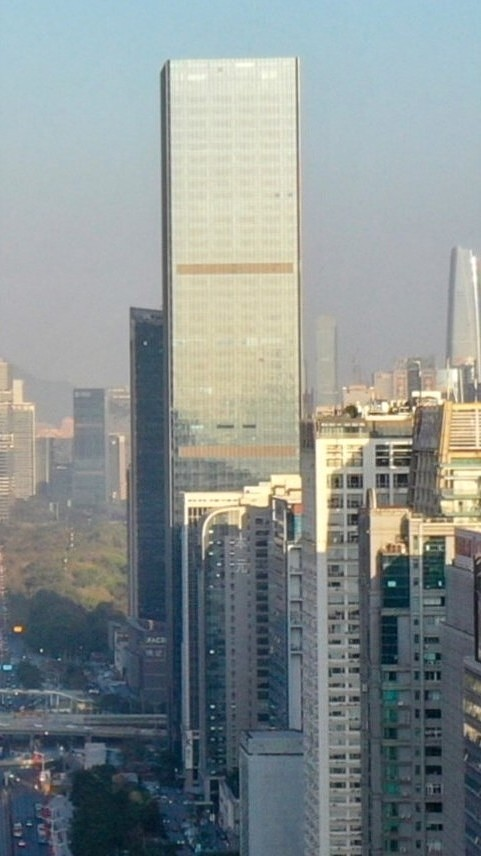
- Interactive map of the Shenzhen Metro Che Kung Temple Hub area

General information
- Status: Completed
- Type: Office
- Location: Shenzhen, China, G2PH+526 Futian, Shenzhen
- Coordinates: 22.53831°N 114.02293°E
- Construction started: 2014
- Completed: 2019

Height
- Roof: 268.8 m (882 ft)

Technical details
- Structural system: Reinforced concrete
- Floor count: 55
- Floor area: 150,000 m^{2} (1,610,000 sq ft)

Design and construction
- Developer: Shenzhen Metro Group Co.

The Shenzhen Metro Che Kung Temple Hub (Chinese: 深铁置业大厦) (also known as Shenzhen Railway Property Building) is a class A office building in Shenzhen, China. Built between 2014 and 2019, the building stands at 268.8 m (882 ft) tall with 55 floors, currently being the 39th tallest building in Shenzhen.

== History ==
=== Architecture ===
The building is located in the proximity of the Chegongmiao station in the Futian neighbourhood of Shenzhen, on the first row of the city cover of Shennan Avenue. It is a high-rise skyscraper subway-covered comprehensive building integrating Grade A office buildings, supporting commercial facilities, and large-scale transportation hubs in the area. The four lines of the Shenzhen Metro (1, 7, 9, and 11) intersect and seamlessly transfer to three-dimensional offices. It is a convenient transportation circle of 30 minutes to the airport, port, and high-speed rail station. The high-rise building has no obstruction to the sea view of the Shenzhen Bay Port, creating a new model of green ecological business value empowerment. The building hosts commercial spaces at levels B2-L4.

Nature, green plants, and waterscape are the central focus of the site, enclosed within the concept of "natural enclosure". The design team thoroughly analyzed the site's viewing angles, traffic flow, microclimate, and privacy. The initial task we were given for the project was to enhance the office area by creating a garden-like ecological office space, and to minimize the impact of traffic on the building by reducing the size of the large concrete viaduct across from it.

== See also ==
- List of tallest buildings in Shenzhen
- List of tallest buildings in China
