= Shenzhen Galaxy Twin Towers =

Skyscrapers in Shenzhen, China

- 深圳星河双子塔
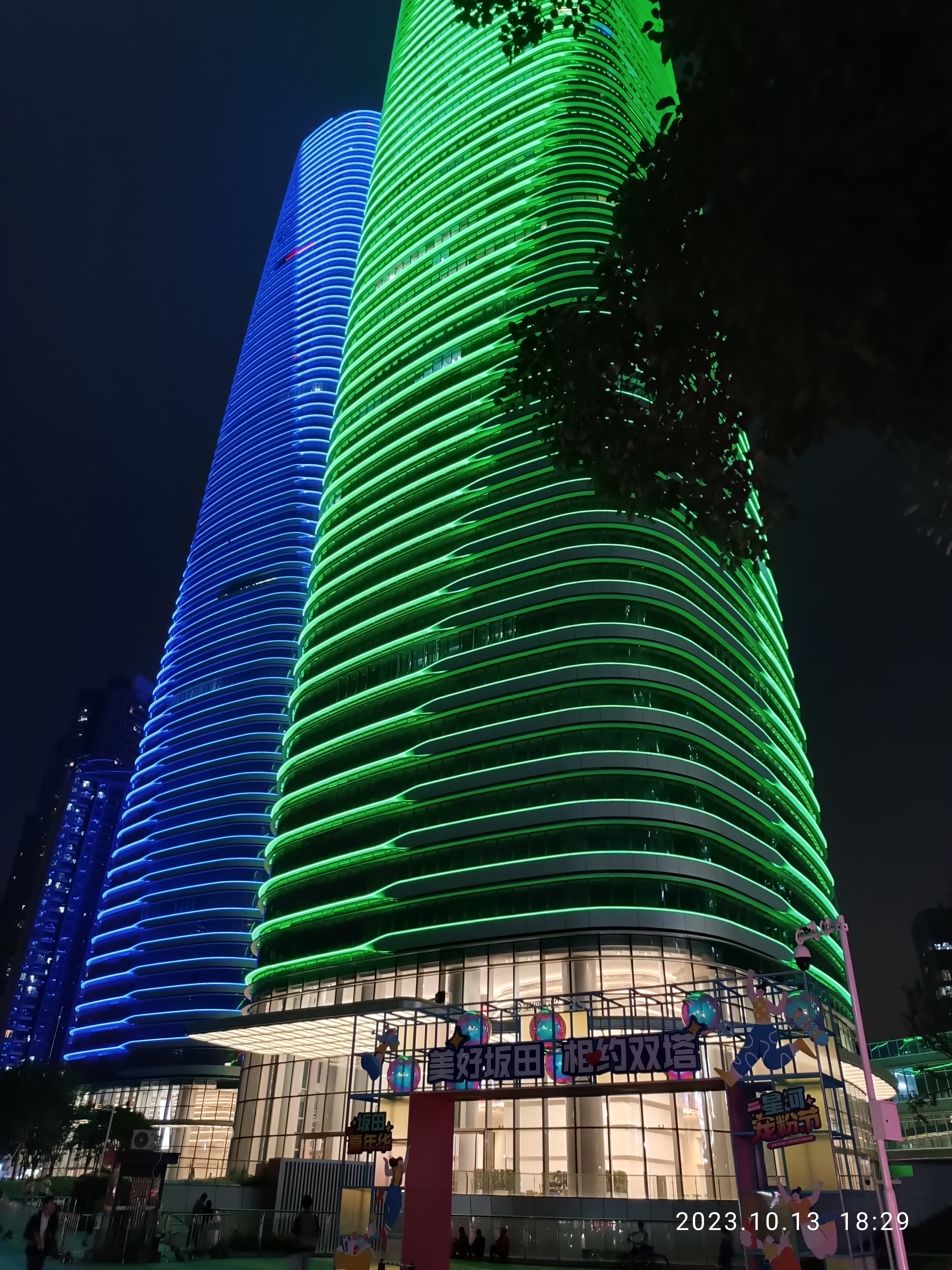
- Interactive map of the Shenzhen Galaxy Twin Towers area

General information
- Status: Completed
- Location: No. 8 Yaxing, Bantian Street, Longgang District, Shenzhen, Guangdong Province, China
- Coordinates: 22.606984°N 114.056655°E
- Construction started: 2017
- Completed: 2023

Height
- Height: 369 metres (1,211 ft)

Technical details
- Structural system: Reinforced concrete
- Floor count: 73 + 95 underground)
- Floor area: 360,000 m^{2} (3,880,000 sq ft)

Design and construction
- Architects: AECOM; YuQiang & Partners
- Developer: Galaxy Industry Group
- Main contractor: China Construction Second Engineering Division; Shanghai Construction Group

Shenzhen Galaxy Twin Towers (Chinese: 深圳星河双子塔) an office skyscraper complex in Shenzhen, China. Built between 2017 and 2023, it consists of two twin towers standing at 369 metres (1,211 ft) with 73 floors. The total construction area is approximately 360,000 m^{2} (3,880,000 sq ft), featuring 73 floors above ground and 5 underground. The towers were structurally topped out in December 2021 and put into use on March 31, 2023.

== Architecture ==
The towers have been designed by the AECOM engineering firm and the YuQiang & Partners Chinese firm. The volumetric concept of the buildings presents them as shaped up as bamboo shots, integrating in the green urban valley which reaches the nearby mountains and the Shenzhen Bay. A total of 65,000 tons of steel were used in the construction. The towers were the first super-tall buildings in China to achieve the prestigious certifications of "WELL V2 Core Platinum" and "LEED V4 Gold" for its sustainable design.

The building complex comprised a large number of modern technology. The aim was to concentrate multiple space facilities and vertical functional differentiation to make it become a three-dimensional 'city in the sky' which can accommodate nearly 30,000 people living office-healthy-green-smart-safe super high-rise landmarks, but also to form a natural environment coexisting with working spaces.

== Transportion ==
The complex is located at No. 8 Yaxing Road, Bantian Street, Longgang District, Shenzhen, Guangdong Province. They are connected to the city by the Yabao station, Line 10 (Shenzhen Metro).

== See also ==
- List of tallest buildings in Shenzhen
- List of tallest buildings in China
