= Huide Tower =

Skyscraper in Shenzhen, China

Coordinates: 22.615216°N 114.025818°E

Huide Tower is a mixed-use skyscraper in Longhua District, Shenzhen. It is 258 meters tall and has 58 above-ground floors and 3 underground floors. It has a floor area of 173,500 m^{2}. It functions as an office building and a hotel. Construction started in 2015 and ended in 2019. Huide Tower is the 31st tallest building in Shenzhen and 429th tallest in the world. Huide Tower was designed by HPP Architects.

The tower was developed by China Railway Construction Engineering Group and Shenzhen Metro. It was built as part of transit oriented development in the area, as it is located near to the adjacent Shenzhen North train station.

== See also ==
- List of tallest buildings in Shenzhen
