= Shum Yip Upperhills Tower 1 =

Supertall skyscraper in Shenzhen, Guangdong, China

- 深业上城大厦1
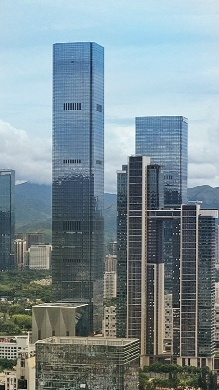
- Shum Yip Upperhills Tower 1 in January 2021
- Interactive map of the Shum Yip Upperhills Tower 1 area

General information
- Status: Completed
- Type: Office
- Location: 5001 Huanggang Road, Futian District, Shenzhen, Guangdong, China
- Coordinates: 22°33′34.5″N 114°04′00″E
- Construction started: February 12, 2014
- Completed: 2020

Height
- Architectural: 388.1 metres (1,273.3 ft)
- Tip: 388.1 metres (1,273.3 ft)
- Top floor: 379.1 metres (1,243.8 ft)

Technical details
- Structural system: Ladder System
- Floor count: 80, plus 3 underground floors
- Floor area: 167,000 m^{2} (1,800,000 sq ft)

Design and construction
- Architect: Skidmore, Owings & Merrill LLP (SOM)
- Structural engineer: Skidmore, Owings & Merrill LLP (SOM-NY)

Shum Yip Upperhills Tower 1
- Simplified Chinese: 深业上城大厦 1
- Traditional Chinese: 深業上城大廈 1
Transcriptions
Standard Mandarin
- Hanyu Pinyin: Shēnyè Shàngchéng Dàshà 1
Yue: Cantonese
- Jyutping: sam^{1}yip^{6} seung^{5}sing^{4} daai^{6}haa^{6} 1

Shum Yip Upperhills Tower 1 (Chinese: 深业上城大厦 1; pinyin: shēnyè shàngchéng dàshà 1) is a supertall skyscraper completed in Shenzhen, Guangdong, China. It stands at 388.1 metres (1,273.3 ft) tall. Construction started on 12 February 2014 and was completed in 2020.

The tower has a novel structural system called a "Ladder Core System" where the perimeter mega columns are connected to the central reinforced concrete core at every story as opposed to the typical configuration where they are only connected via outriggers at mechanical floors.

Additionally, unlike other supertall skyscrapers with mega-columns, Shum Yip T1 does not have any supplemental gravity columns in the office portion of the tower. The corner framing on either side of the mega-columns is cantilevered 8.5m, which creates a balanced cantilever thus reducing the demand of the middle span an achieving a 28.5m column free span between the two mega-columns on each face.

== See also ==
- List of tallest buildings in Shenzhen
- List of tallest buildings in China
- List of tallest buildings in the world
