= Riverfront Times Square =

Skyscraper in Shenzhen, Guangdong, China

- 京基滨河时代广场
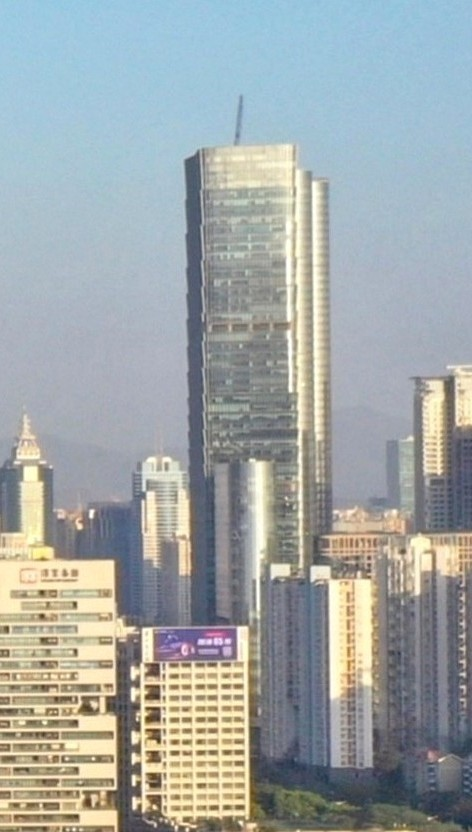
- Riverfront Times Square in February 2021
- Interactive map of the Riverfront Times Square area

General information
- Status: Completed
- Type: Office
- Location: 9289 Binhe Boulevard, Futian District, Shenzhen, Guangdong, China
- Coordinates: 22°31′49″N 114°01′24″E
- Construction started: 2012
- Completed: 2016

Height
- Architectural: 293 m (961 ft)
- Tip: 293 m (961 ft)

Technical details
- Floor count: 64

Riverfront Times Square (Chinese: 京基滨河时代广场) is a 293-meter tall skyscraper in Shenzhen, China. Construction started in 2012 and was completed in 2016.

== See also ==
- List of tallest buildings in Shenzhen
