= Baoneng Center =

Supertall skyscraper in Shenzhen, Guangdong, China

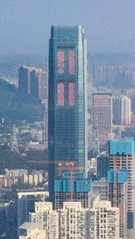
- Baoneng Center Shenzhen in February 2021
- Interactive map of the Baoneng Center area

General information
- Status: Completed
- Location: 3008 Baoan Road North, Luohu District, Shenzhen, Guangdong, China
- Coordinates: 22°33′52″N 114°06′15″E
- Construction started: June 15, 2014
- Completed: October 23, 2018
- Opened: June 11, 2020
- Owner: Baoneng Group

Height
- Architectural: 327.3 m (1,074 ft)
- Tip: 327.3 m (1,074 ft)
- Top floor: 296.4 m (972 ft)

Technical details
- Floor count: 71

Design and construction
- Architect: César Pelli
- Developer: Shenye Logistics Group
- Main contractor: China Construction Second Building Group

The Baoneng Center is a supertall skyscraper in Shenzhen, Guangdong, China. It is 328 metres (1,076.1 ft) tall. Construction started in 2014 and was completed in 2020.

The architecture firm Aedas designed Baoneng Center for Baoneng Group.

== See also ==
- List of tallest buildings in Shenzhen
- List of tallest buildings in China
