= Huaxun Center =

Skyscraper in Shenzhen, Guangdong, China

- 华讯大厦
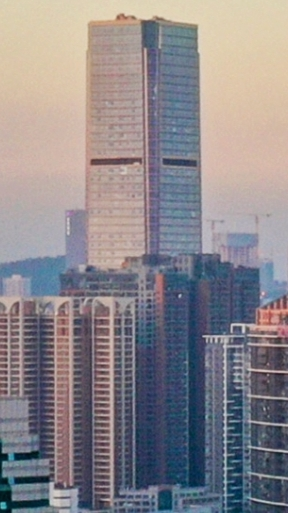
- Interactive map of the Huaxun Center area

General information
- Status: Completed
- Type: Office
- Location: Shenzhen, China, G4X5+VQ2, Baoan Rd S, Luohu, Shenzhen 518022
- Coordinates: 22.54966°N 114.10937°E
- Construction started: 2014
- Completed: 2018

Height
- Roof: 286 m (938 ft)

Technical details
- Structural system: Concrete
- Floor count: 70

Design and construction
- Architects: Guangzhou Design Institute Group Co., Ltd.
- Developer: Huaxun Weiye

The Huaxun Center (Chinese: 华讯大厦) (also known as the ECCOM Center) is an Office skyscraper in Shenzhen, China. Built between 2014 and 2018, the tower stands at 286 m (938 ft) tall with 70 floors and is the 32nd tallest building in Shenzhen.

== Architecture ==
The tower is situated in the Luohu District of Shenzhen, in the proximity of the KK100 and Shun Hing Square towers. The building's glazing is made of curtain wall glass which consists of special AVIC insulated glass with a total quantity of 50,000 m^{2} (538,000 sq ft) of material.

On July 27, 2022, a fire broke out at the 50th floor of the building. The Shenzhen Fire Department issued a notice one day later in which they declared the fire extinguished without any injuries or casualties.

== See also ==
- List of tallest buildings in Shenzhen
- List of tallest buildings in China
