= Hon Kwok City Center =

Supertall skyscraper in Shenzhen, Guangdong, China

- 汉国城市商业中心
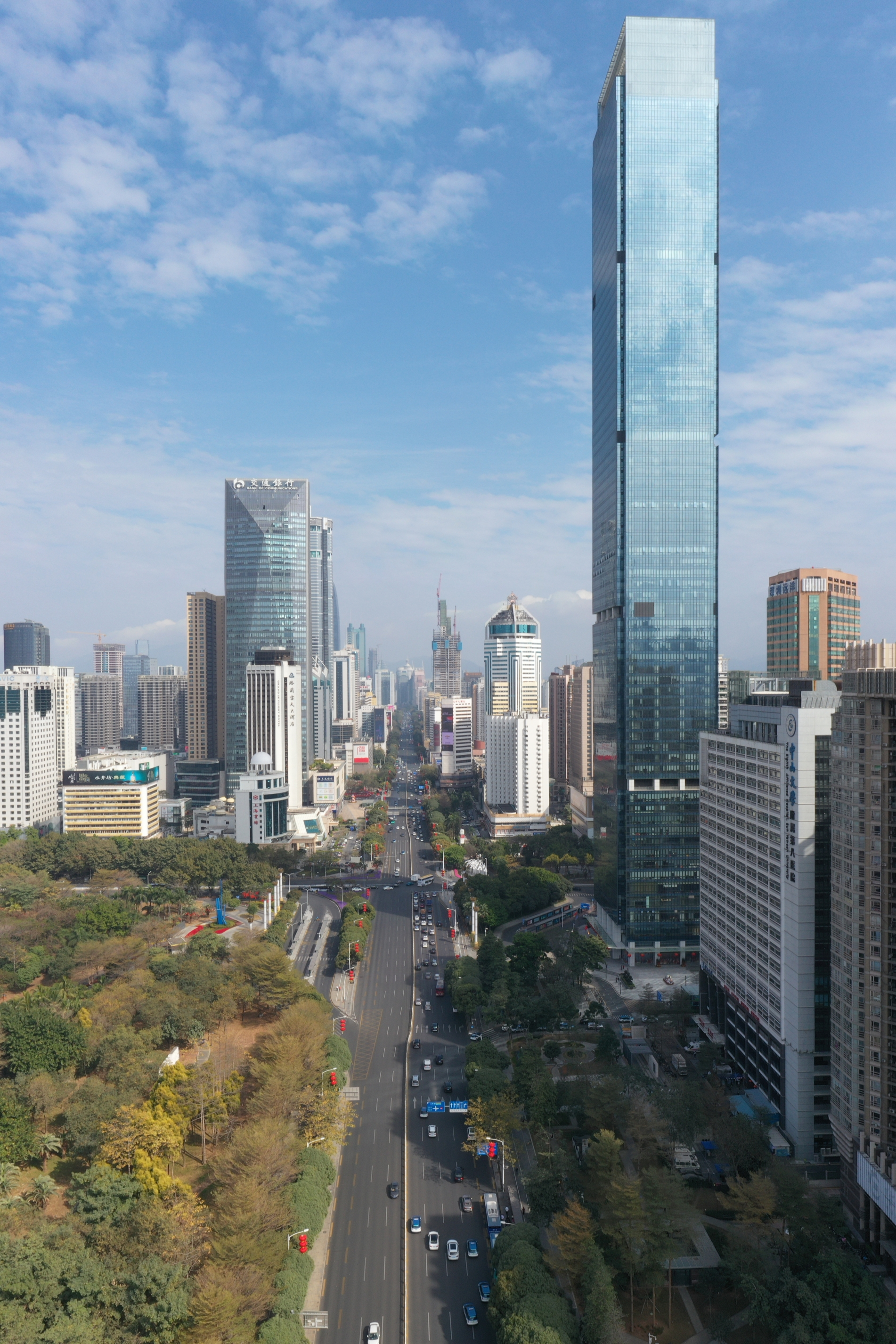
- Hon Kwok City Center in Shennan Boulevard (middle road)
- Interactive map of the Hon Kwok City Center area

General information
- Status: Completed
- Type: Hotel / office / residential
- Location: 3031 Shennan Middle Road, Futian District, Shenzhen, Guangdong, China
- Coordinates: 22°32′33″N 114°04′30″E
- Construction started: 2010
- Completed: 2017

Height
- Architectural: 329.4 m (1,081 ft)
- Tip: 329.4 m (1,081 ft)
- Top floor: 302.2 m (991 ft)

Technical details
- Floor count: 80
- Floor area: 163,700 m^{2} (1,762,052 sq ft)
- Lifts/elevators: 30

Design and construction
- Architecture firm: Skidmore, Owings & Merrill
- Developer: Hon Kwok Land Investment Company, Limited
- Main contractor: China Construction Second Building Group

Hon Kwok City Center (Chinese: 汉国城市商业中心) is a skyscraper in Shenzhen, China. Construction began in 2010 and was completed in 2017. The skyscraper serves as a mixed-use building with residential and office space.

== See also ==
- List of tallest buildings in Shenzhen
- List of tallest buildings in China
