= Shenzhen Urban Construction & Tower =

Skyscraper in Shenzhen, Guangdong, China

- 城建雲啟大廈
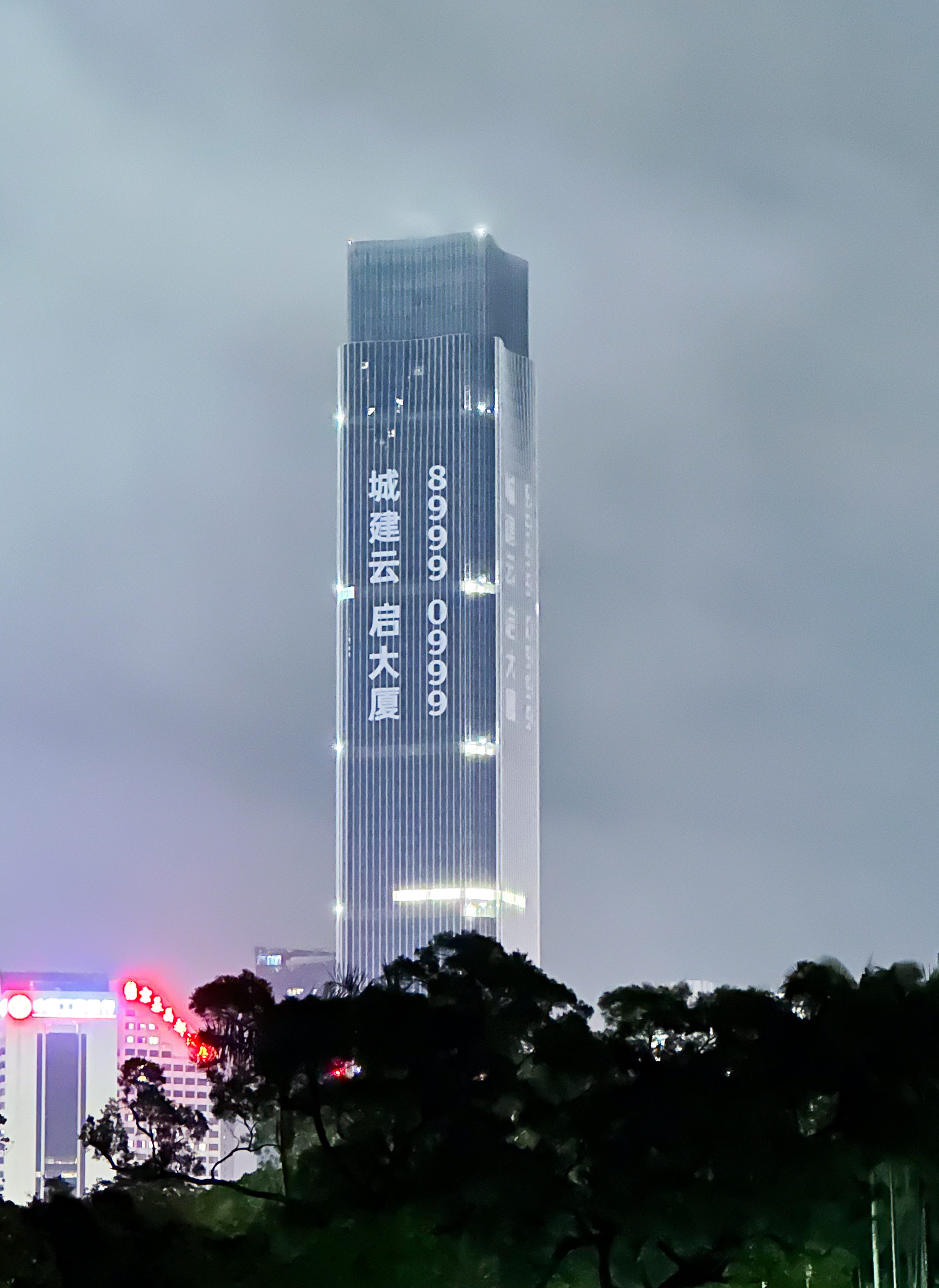

General information
- Status: Completed
- Type: Office
- Location: G4Q4+573, Hongling Middle Road, Luohu, Shenzhen, China
- Coordinates: 22°32′26″N 114°6′1″E
- Construction started: 2020
- Completed: 2024

Height
- Roof: 333 m (1,093 ft)

Technical details
- Structural system: Reinforced concrete
- Floor count: 72 (+5 underground)
- Floor area: 150,000 m^{2} (1,610,000 sq ft)

Design and construction
- Architects: Gensler; Huayi Design
- Developer: Shenzhen City Construction Land Development
- Main contractor: China Construction Second Engineering Bureau

The Shenzhen Urban Construction & Tower (Chinese: 城建雲啟大廈) also known as the Chengjian Yunqi Building is a class A office building in Shenzhen, China. Built between 2020 and 2024, the building stands at 333 m (1,093 ft) tall with 72 floors, currently being the 14th tallest building in Shenzhen.

== History ==
The building is popularly known as the Yunqi Tower. Classified as a modernist Grade A office building in the Nanshan District of Shenzhen, it has attracted much attention since its initial planning stages. Developed by Shenzhen Urban Construction Development Group, the project represents a total investment of 2 billion RMB, covering an area of approximately 20,000 square meters and a total construction area exceeding 150,000 m^{2} (1,610,000 sq ft). Construction began in 2018, and after meticulous design and construction, it was officially completed and put into use in 2022. Adhering to green building principles, the project has achieved LEED Gold certification, demonstrating its commitment to environmental protection and sustainable development.

Notably, as the first project in the area of the proposed Caiwuwei Center and the starting project for the Hongling Emerging Financial Industry Belt, the building was completed and put into use by the end of 2024, becoming the tallest building owned by a state-owned enterprise in Shenzhen and a new landmark in Luohu, adding 20,000 square meters of high-quality space to the total of 150,000 planned. The project is located at the southeast corner of the intersection of Jinhua Street and Hongling South Road, Luohu District.

== See also ==
- List of tallest buildings in Shenzhen
- List of tallest buildings in China
