= AVIC Plaza =

Skyscraper in Shenzhen, Guangdong, China

- 中航广场
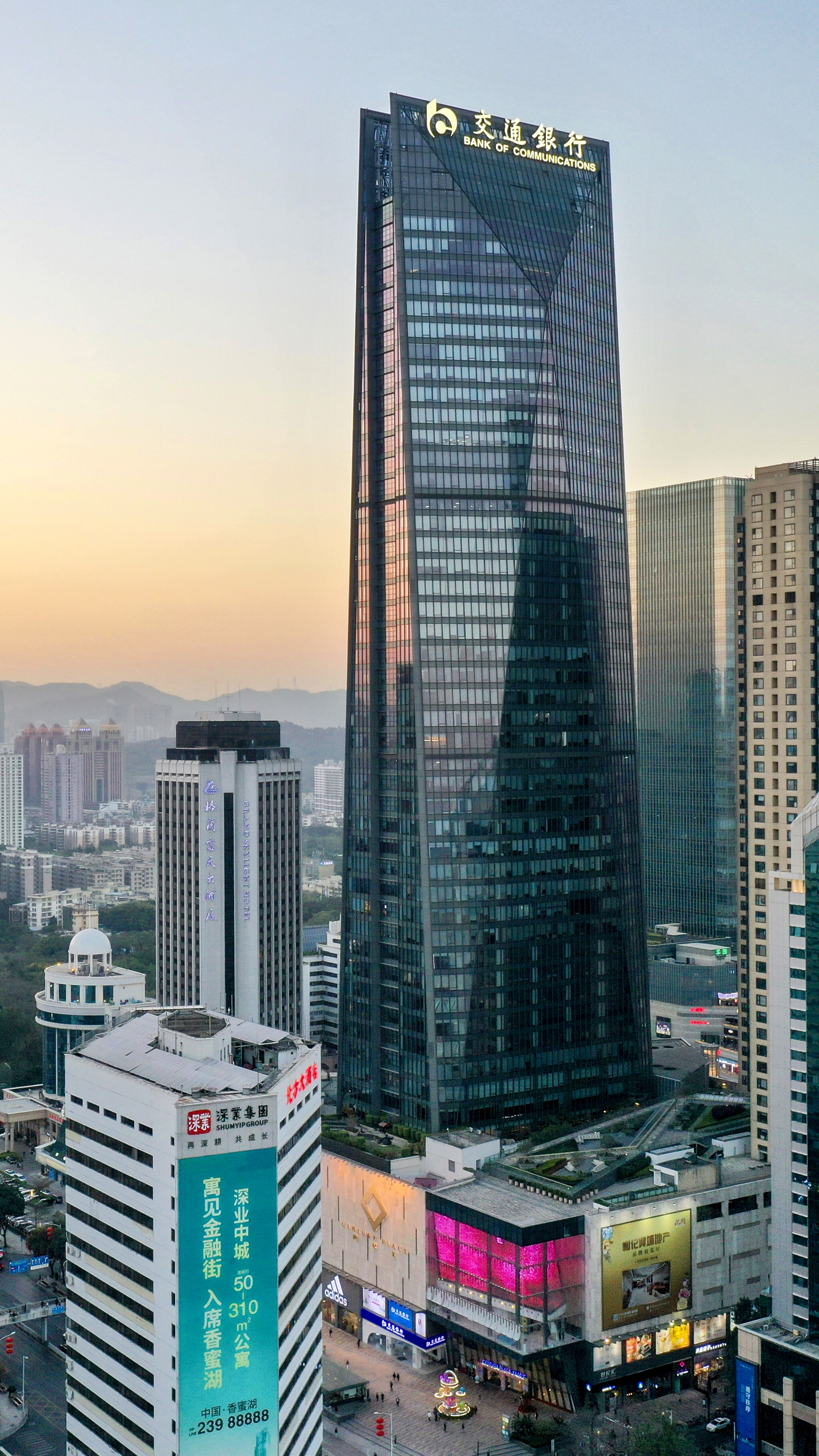
- AVIC Plaza in February 2021
- Interactive map of the AVIC Plaza area

General information
- Status: Completed
- Type: Office
- Location: 23 F Hangdu Plaza Catic Zone, Shennan Middle Road, Futian District, Shenzhen, Guangdong, China
- Coordinates: 22°32′37″N 114°04′38″E
- Construction started: 2007
- Completed: 2012

Height
- Antenna spire: 254 m (833 ft)
- Top floor: 254 m (833 ft)

Technical details
- Floor count: 52

Design and construction
- Architect: Skidmore, Owings & Merrill

AVIC Plaza, Shenzhen (Chinese: 深圳中航广场) is a 833 ft (254 m) skyscraper in Shenzhen, Guangdong, China. At the time it was completed in 2012, it became the thirty-fifth-tallest building in Shenzhen.

== See also ==
- List of tallest buildings in Shenzhen
