= China Chuneng Tower =

Skyscraper in Shenzhen, Guangdong, China

- 中国储能大厦
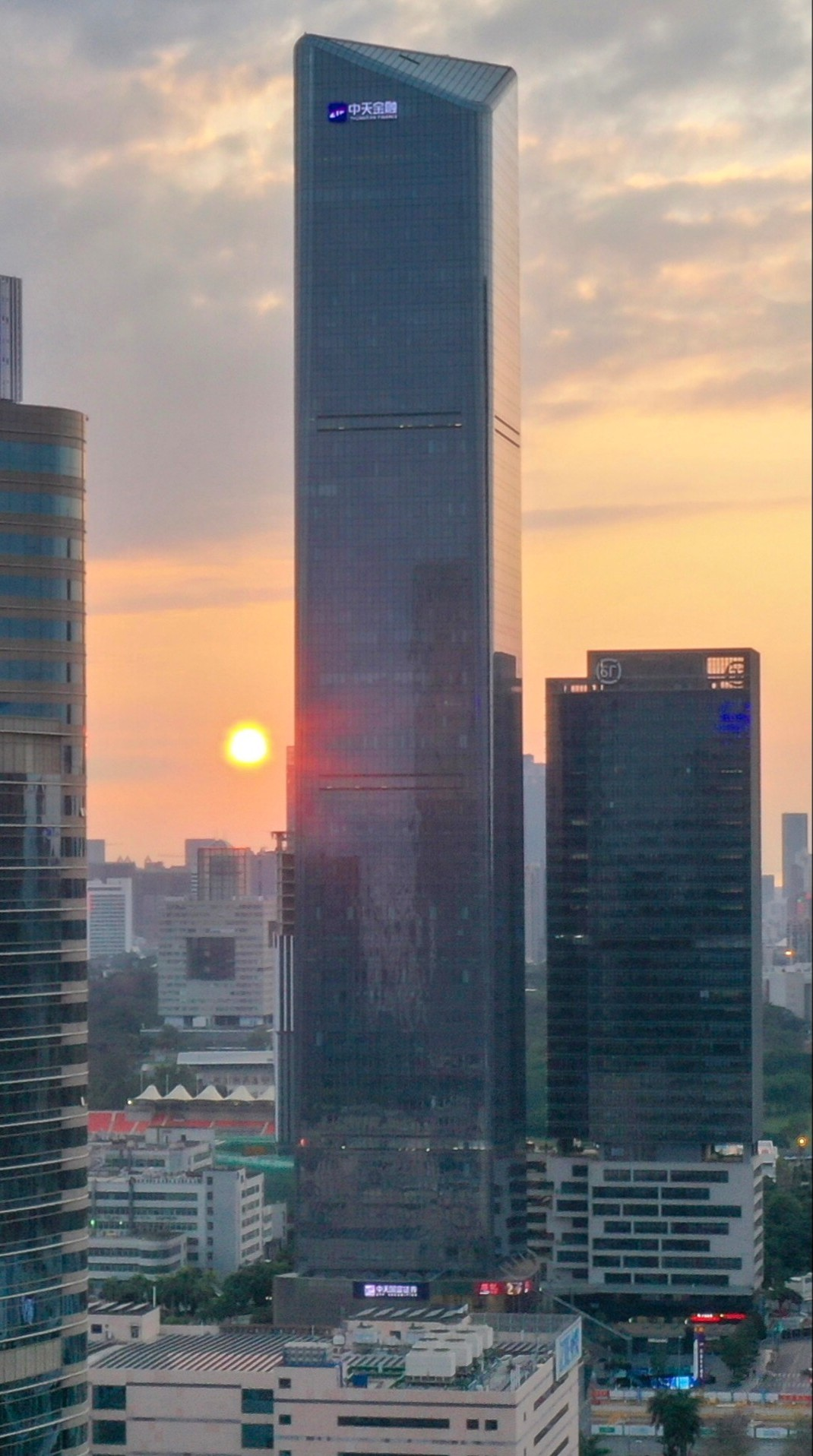
- China Chuneng Tower in February 2021
- Interactive map of the China Chuneng Tower area

General information
- Status: Completed
- Type: Office
- Location: 3099 Keyuan South Road, Hi-Tech Park South, Nanshan District, Shenzhen, Guangdong, China
- Coordinates: 22°32′27″N 113°56′24″E
- Construction started: 2013
- Completed: 2016

Height
- Architectural: 288.6 metres (946.9 ft)
- Tip: 288.6 metres (946.9 ft)

Technical details
- Floor count: 62

China Chuneng Tower (Chinese: 中国储能大厦) is a 288.6-metre (946.9 ft) tall skyscraper in Shenzhen, Guangdong, China. Construction started in 2013 and was completed in 2016.

== See also ==
- List of tallest buildings in Shenzhen
