= NEO Tower =

Skyscraper complex in Shenzhen, Guangdong, China

- NEO绿景广场
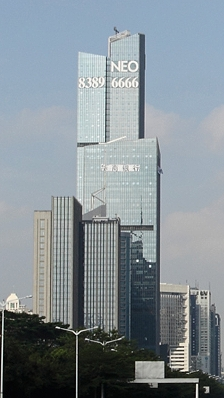
- NEO Tower in 2011
- Interactive map of the NEO Tower area

General information
- Type: Office
- Location: 6011 Shennan Boulevard, Futian, Shenzhen, China
- Construction started: 2007
- Opened: 2011

NEO Tower, or NEO Lvjiing Plaza (Chinese: NEO绿景广场) is an office complex in Shenzhen, China consisting of a main building 273 meters and 56 stories tall. Construction started in 2007 and was completed in 2011.

== See also ==
- List of tallest buildings in Shenzhen
