= Huiyun Center =

Skyscraper in Shenzhen, Guangdong, China

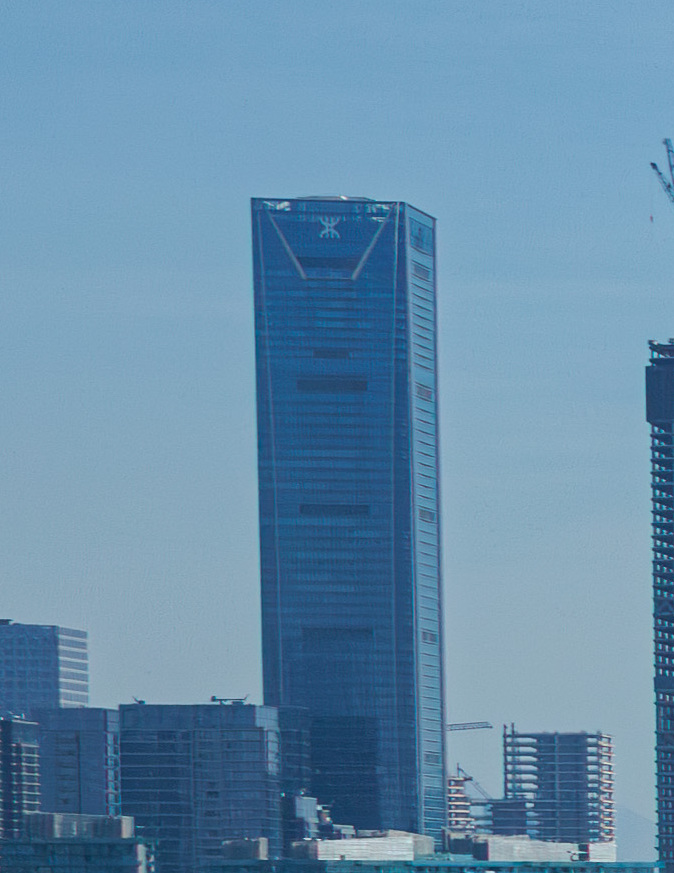
- Interactive map of the Huiyun Center area

General information
- Status: Completed
- Type: Office, Hotel
- Location: Nanshan District, Shenzhen, Guangdong, China
- Coordinates: 22°31′36.87″N 113°57′55.23″E
- Construction started: 2016
- Completed: 2023
- Owner: China Vanke, Shenzhen Metro

Height
- Architectural: 359.2 m (1,178 ft)

Technical details
- Floor count: 80

Design and construction
- Architecture firm: Shenzhen Aube Architectural Engineering Design
- Main contractor: China Construction Third Building Group

The Huiyun Center is a super-tall skyscraper in Shenzhen, Guangdong, China. The building is 359.2 meters high and has 80 floors. Construction began in 2016 and was completed in 2023.

This mixed-use building, which includes both office and hotel space, is part of the Shenwan Huiyun Center, a model district in Shenzhen that combines work, leisure and retail space and has good transport links.

== See also ==
- List of tallest buildings
- List of tallest buildings in China
- List of tallest buildings in Shenzhen
