= Excellence Century Plaza =

Skyscraper in Shenzhen, Guangdong, China

- 卓越世纪中心
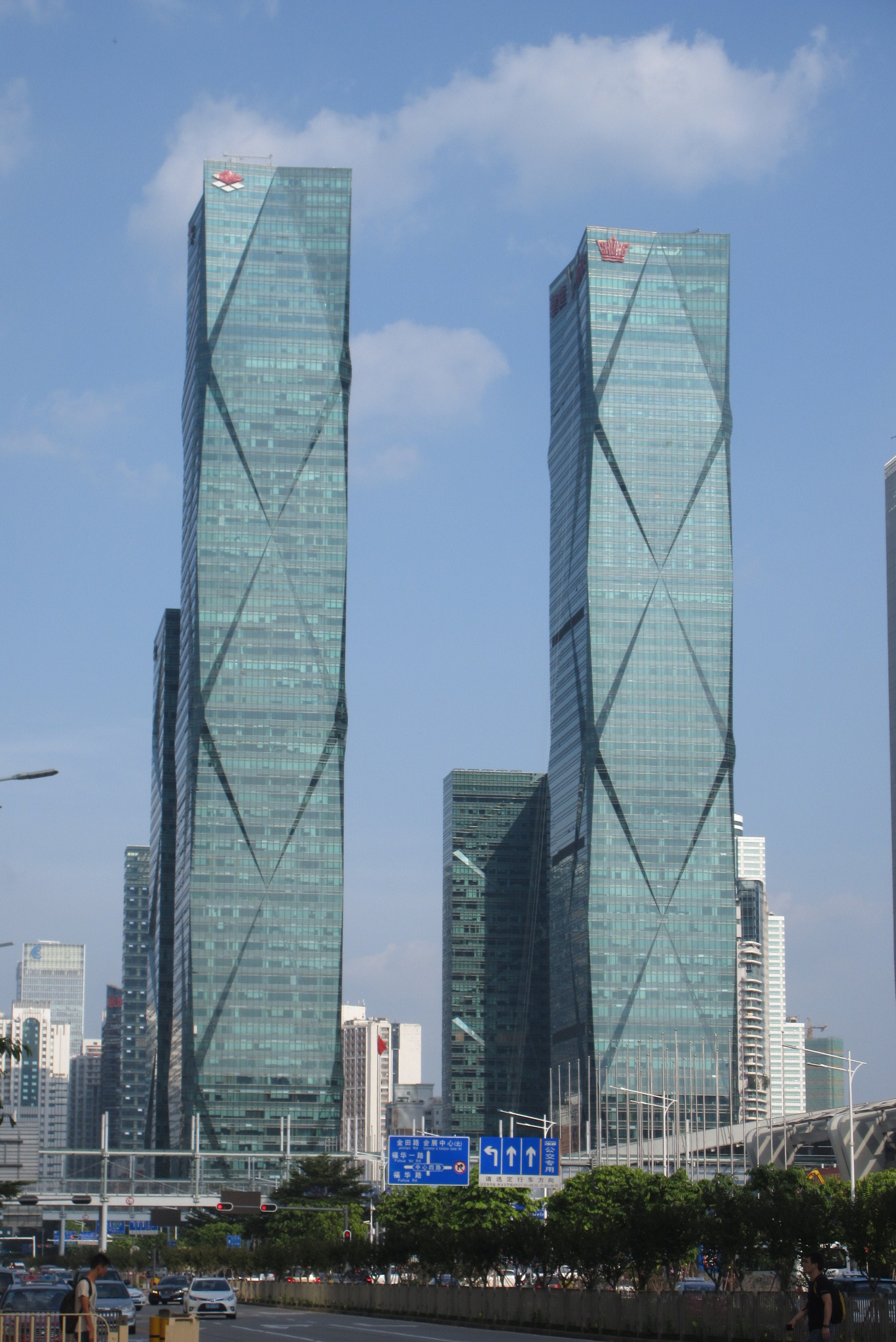
- Interactive map of the Excellence Century Plaza area

General information
- Status: Completed
- Type: Mixed-use, Hotel, Office
- Location: Shenzhen, China, 2030 Jintian Road, Fu Tian Qu, Shenzhen, 中心城 邮政编码: 518000
- Coordinates: 22.54465°N 114.05919°E
- Construction started: 2007
- Completed: 2010

Height
- Roof: 280 m (920 ft) (Tower 1); 250 m (820 ft) (Tower 2); 185 m (607 ft) (Tower 3); 156 m (512 ft) (Tower 4)

Technical details
- Structural system: Concrete
- Floor count: 60 (Tower 1); 57 (Tower 2); 45 (Tower 3); 37 (Tower 4)
- Floor area: 400,000 m^{2} (4,310,000 sq ft) (entire complex); 34,000 m^{2} (366,000 sq ft) (parking)
- Lifts/elevators: 116

Design and construction
- Architects: Leo A. Daly & Larry Oltmanns
- Structural engineer: CCDI Group

The Excellence Century Plaza (Chinese: 卓越世纪中心) is a mixed-use skyscraper building complex in Shenzhen, China. Built between 2007 and 2010, the complex consists of four towers with the tallest one (Tower 1) standing at 280 m (920 ft) tall with 60 floors. Two of the towers serve the function of hotels, while the other two are office buildings.

== History ==
=== Architecture ===
Inaugurated in 2010, the building complex is situated in the Futian district of Shenzhen, in the proximity of the Ping An Finance Centre and the Shenzhen Grandview Plaza. It has a concept inspired by the number 8, which is considered the most auspicious number in the Chinese civilisation and symbolizes prosperity and good fortune. The project's podium, which anchors the four towers, is enveloped in glass and features a mix of retail, restaurant and entertainment areas.

Designed by American architects Leo A. Daly & Larry Oltmanns and supervised by the CCDI Group, the project features two main towers measuring 60 and 57 floors, and two secondary towers measuring 45 and 37 floors. Each building's glazing contains glass curtain walls, chamfered corners, and large diamond-shaped facades that extend and step back from the typical floor plates. The towers contain office, hotel, and serviced apartment space, with a rooftop restaurant. The project's glass-enclosed podium anchors the four towers and contains retail, restaurant, and entertainment areas. In contrast to the usual indoor malls in Shenzhen, the Excellence Huanggang Century Center includes a central courtyard that is outdoors and connects visitors, workers, and residents to the surrounding environment.

== Buildings ==
Name	Image	Height m (ft)	Floors	Function
Tower 1		280 m (920 ft)	60	Office
Tower 2		250 m (820 ft)	57	Hotel
Tower 3		185 m (607 ft)	45	Office
Tower 4		156 m (512 ft)	37	Hotel

== See also ==
- List of tallest buildings in Shenzhen
- List of tallest buildings in China
