= China Merchants Tower =

Skyscraper in Shenzhen, Guangdong, China

- 招商局广场
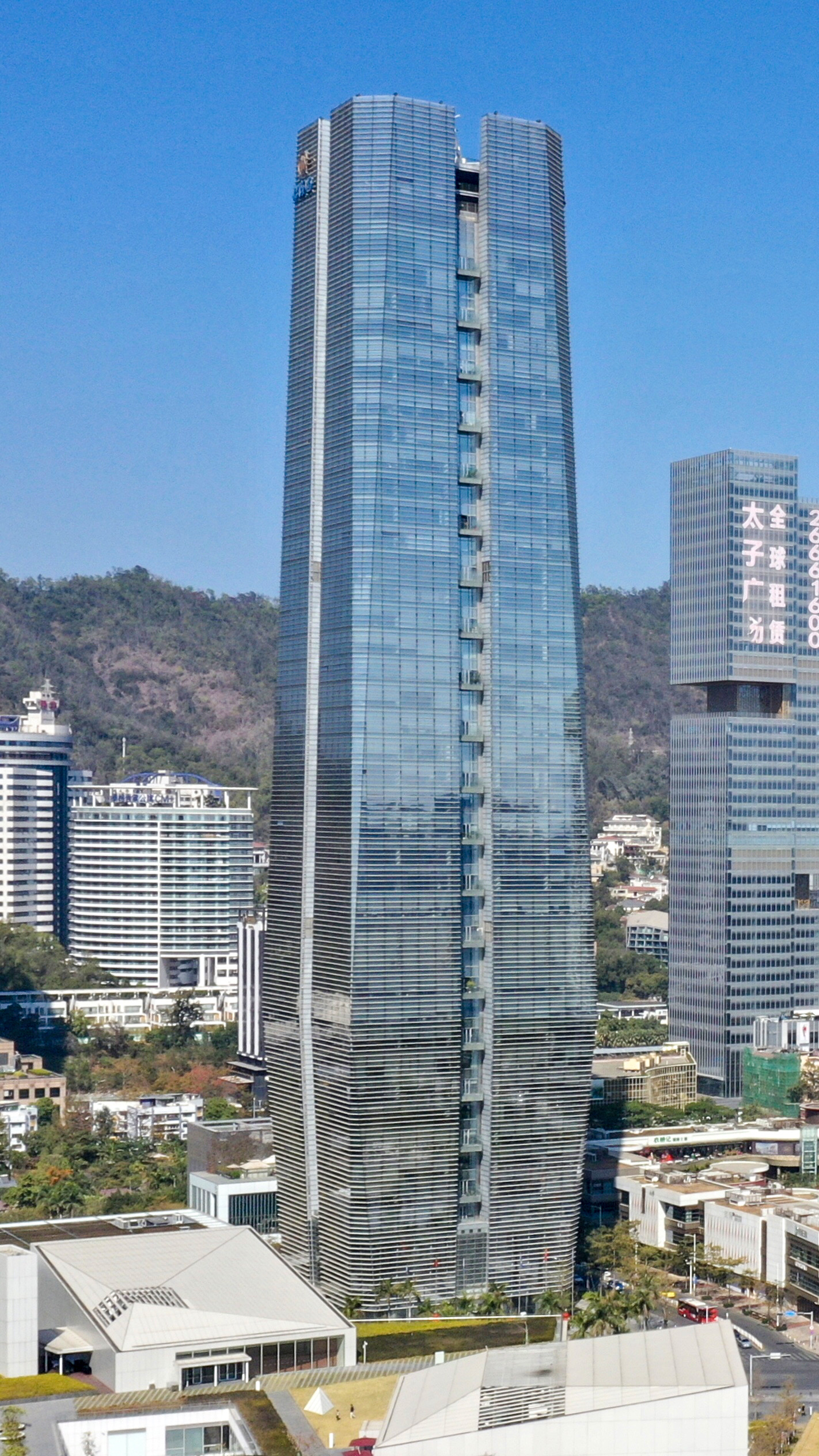
- The China Merchants Tower in February 2021
- Interactive map of the China Merchants Tower area

General information
- Status: Completed
- Type: Office / Retail
- Location: 1166 Wanghai Road, Nanshan District, Shenzhen, Guangdong, China
- Coordinates: 22.4844077°N 113.9109491°E
- Construction started: 2010
- Completed: 2013
- Opening: 2013

Height
- Architectural: 211 m (692 ft)
- Tip: 211 m (692 ft)

Technical details
- Floor count: 37
- Floor area: 103,000 m^{2} (1,108,700 sq ft)

Design and construction
- Architect: SOM

China Merchants Tower (Chinese: 招商局广场) is a skyscraper in Shekou, Nanshan District, Shenzhen, China. It was designed by Skidmore, Owings, & Merrill.

== Design ==
The building is designed to allow access to outdoor balconies on every level. The tower is covered with glass-made, unitized curtain wall, with tightly placed horizontal fins in order to minimize solar gain.

== Awards ==
- Architizer A+ Award: Office Building High Rise (2015)
- Award of Merit: Architectural Engineering Integration (2015)

== Gallery ==
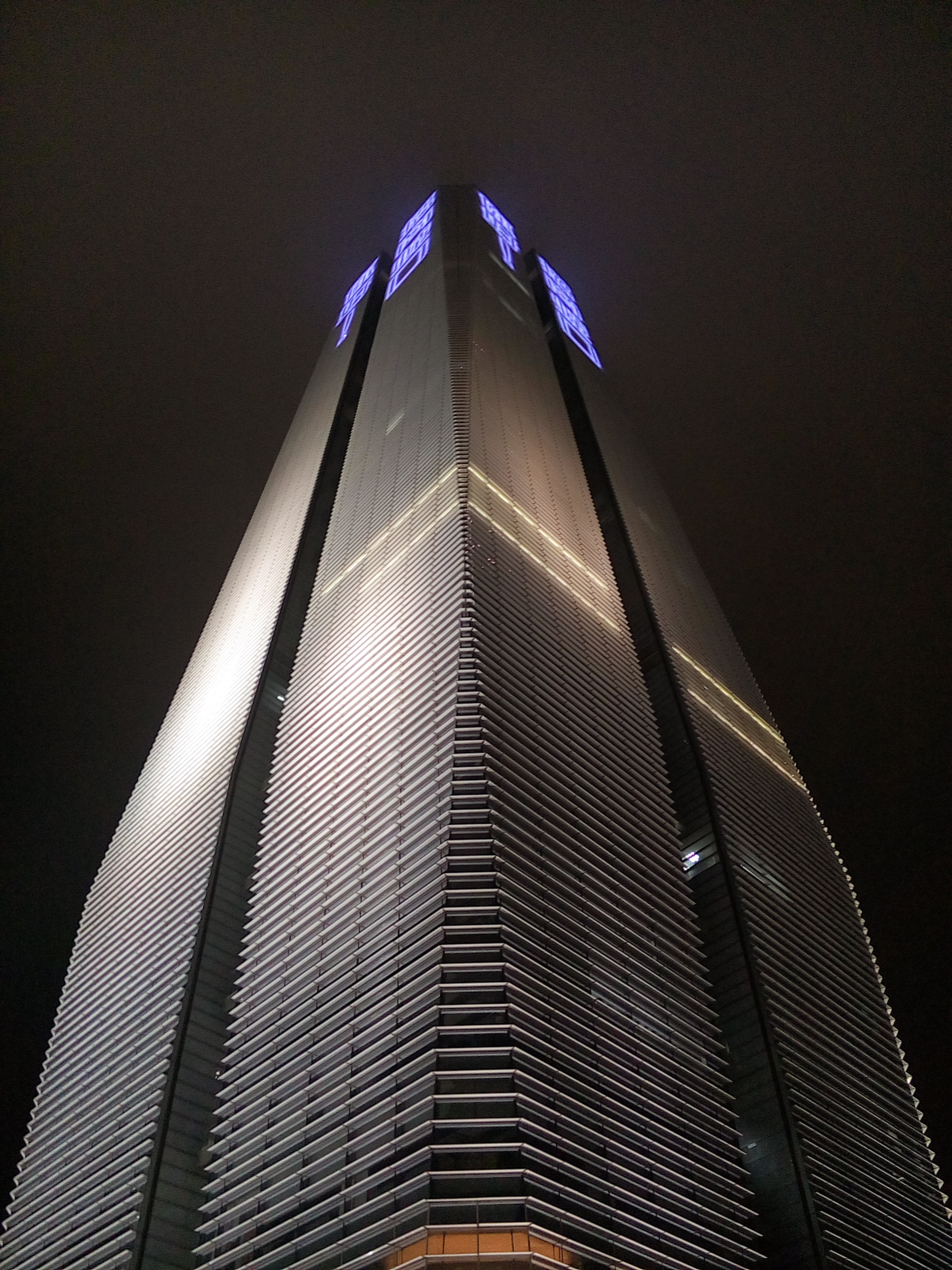

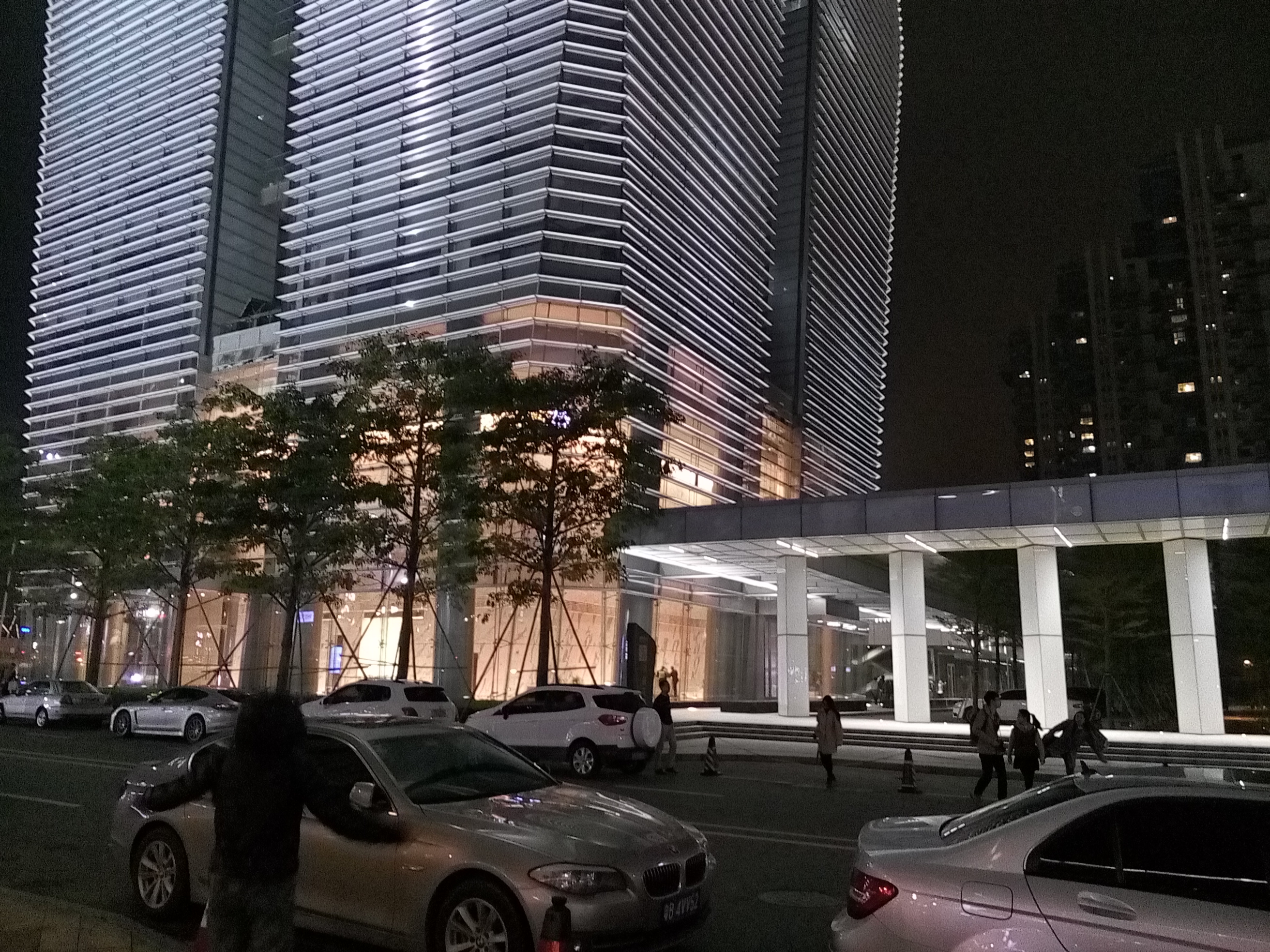

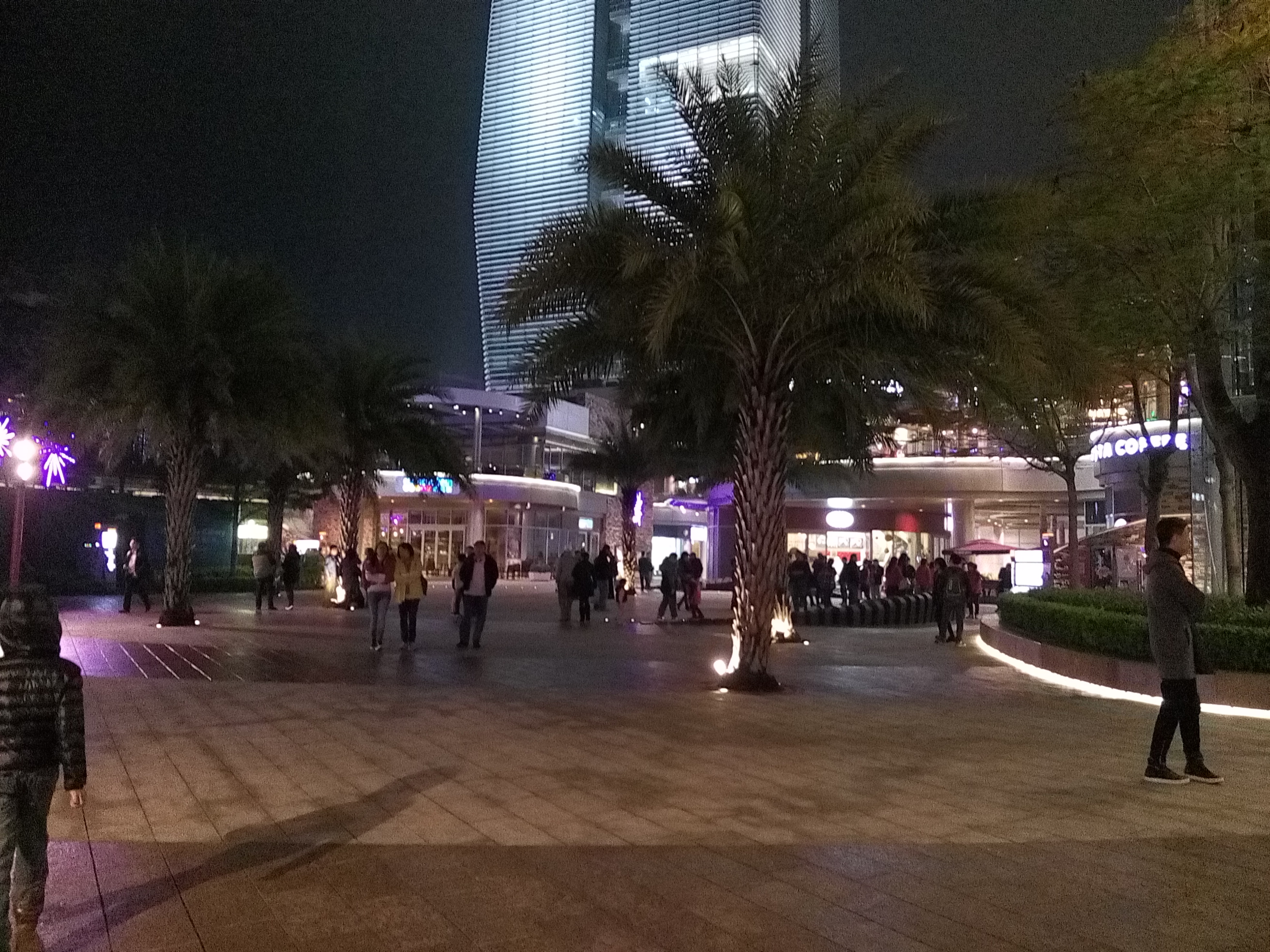

== See also ==
- List of tallest buildings in Shenzhen
