= List of tallest buildings in Shenzhen =

Tall buildings in Shenzhen
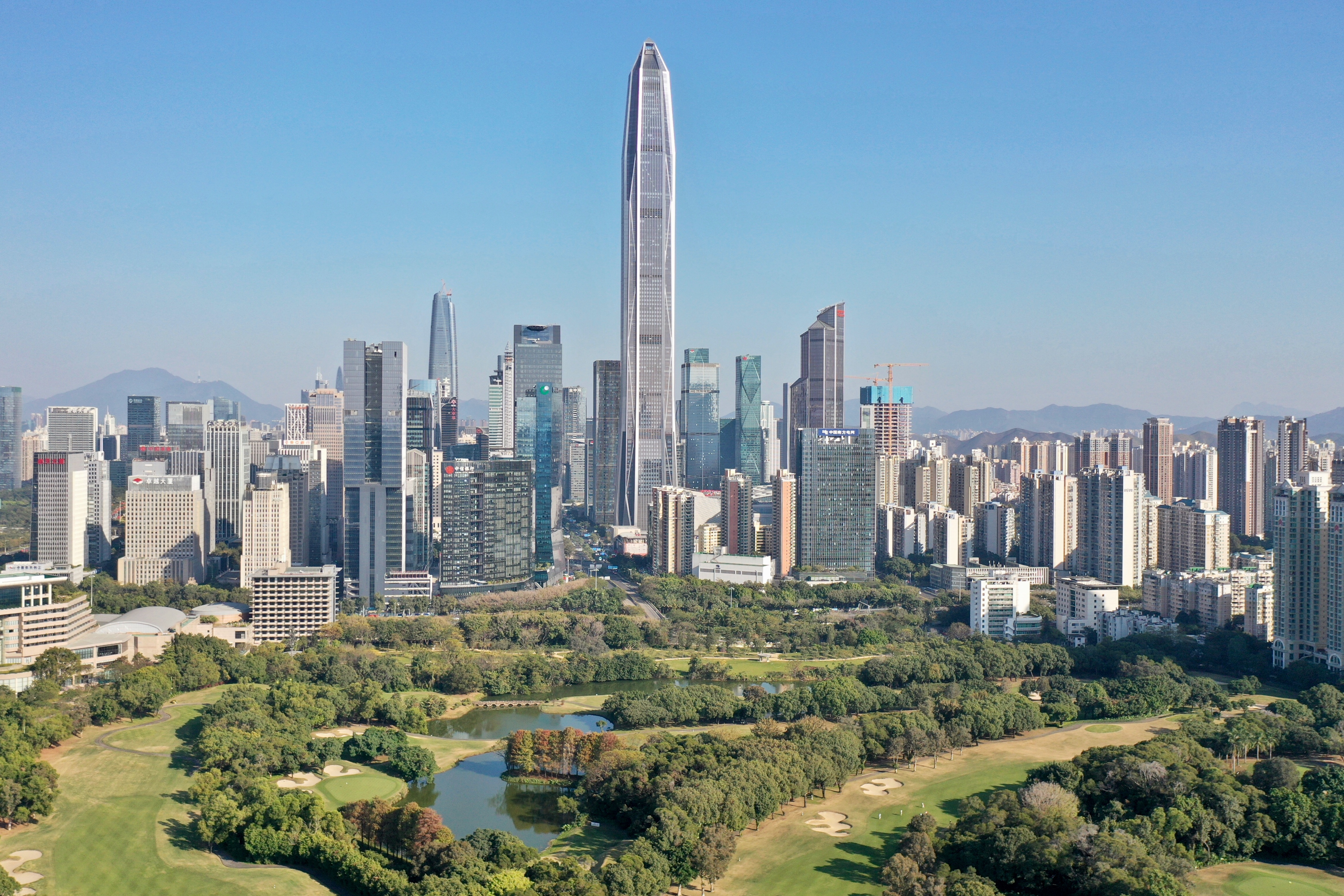
- Futian District
- Tallest building: Ping An Finance Center (2017)
- First 150 m+ building: International Foreign Trade Centre (1985)

Number of tall buildings
- Taller than 150 m (492 ft): 469 (2025) (2nd)
- Taller than 200 m (656 ft): 200 (2025) (1st)
- Taller than 300 m (984 ft): 22 (2025) (2nd)
- Taller than 400 m (1,312 ft): 2

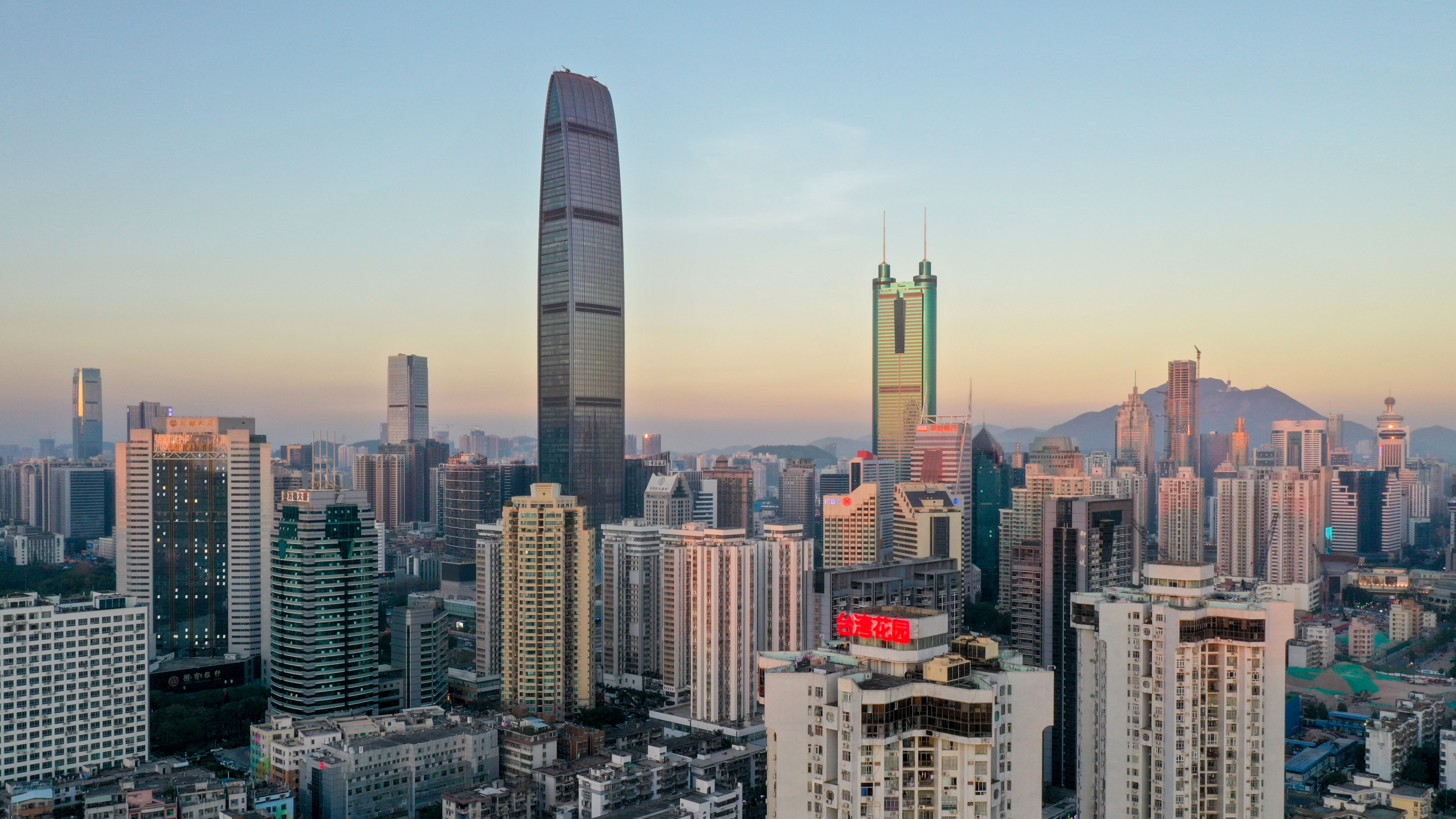
The skyline in Luohu District featuring KK100 and Shun Hing Square

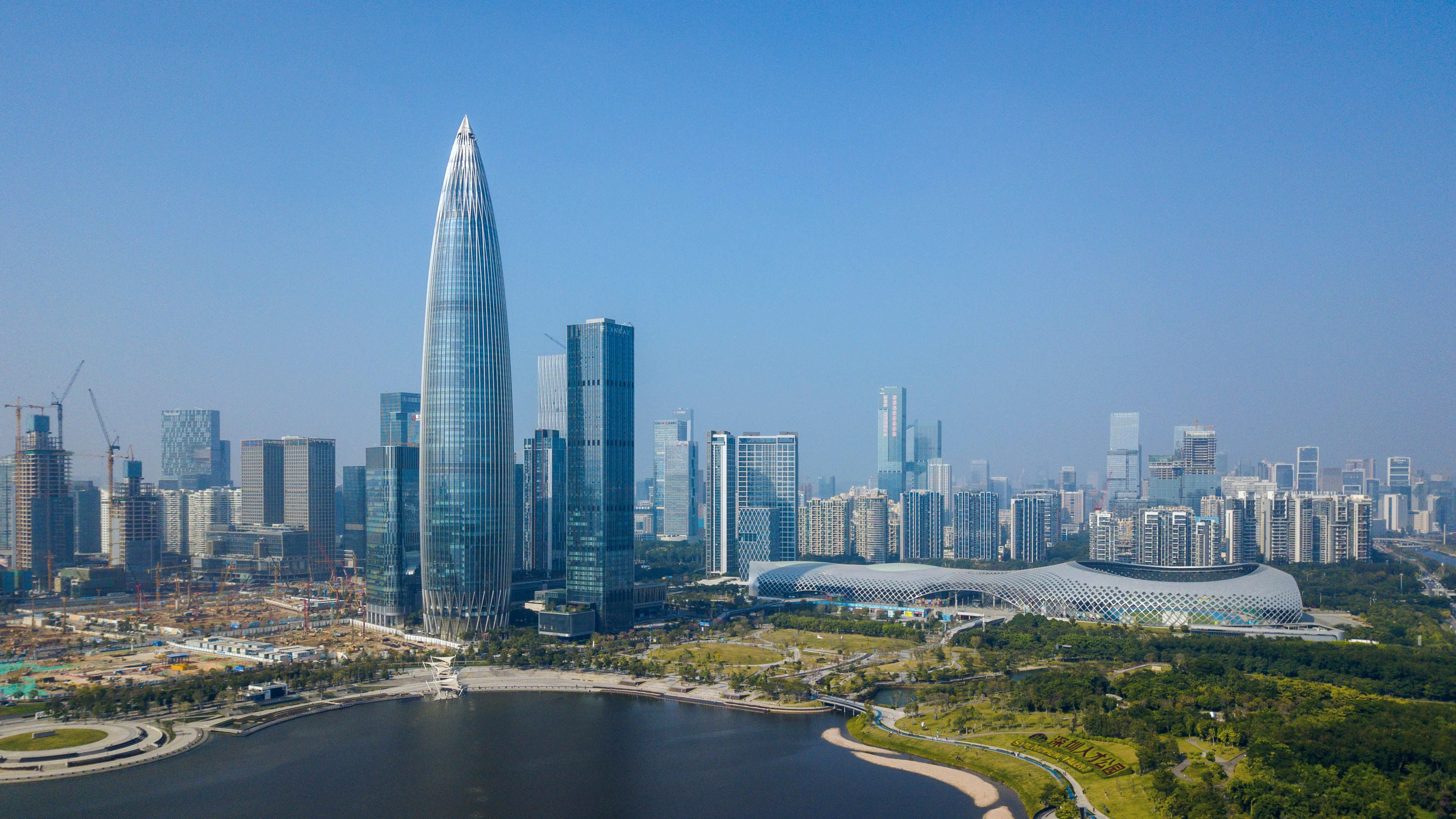
The skyline in Shenzhen Bay, Nanshan District with China Resources Headquarters

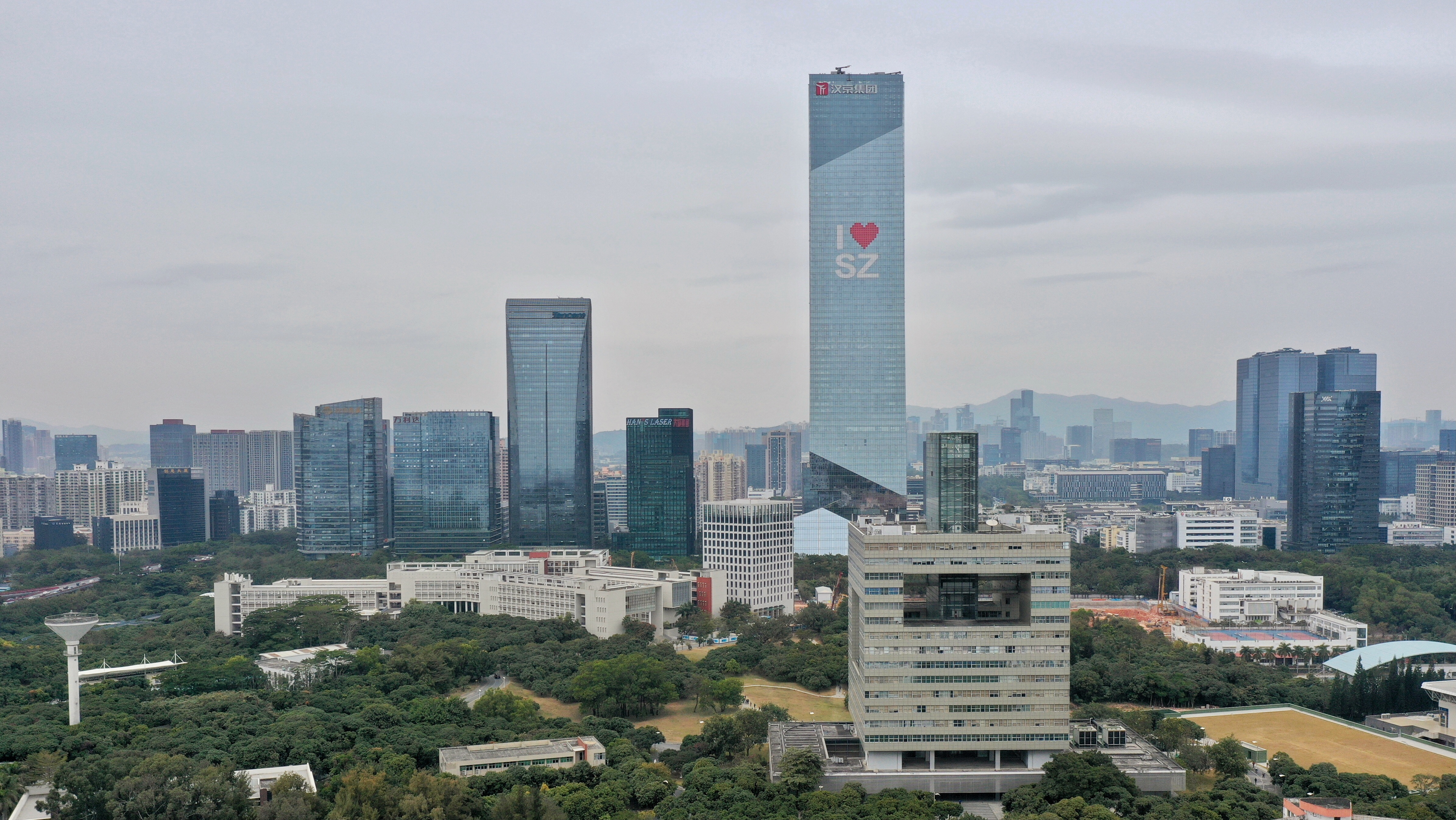
The skyline from the SUZ to the north, Nanshan District with Hanking Center

Shenzhen, a major city and Special Economic Zone in Guangdong, China, is home to over 443 completed skyscrapers taller than 150 m (492 ft), of which 184 are taller than 200 m (656 ft), making it the largest concentration of skyscrapers above 200 m in the world. The tallest building in Shenzhen is the Ping An Finance Centre, which rises 599 m (1,965 ft). The 115-story skyscraper also stands as the second-tallest building in China and the fifth-tallest building in the world. At 442 m (1,450 ft), the KK100 is the second-tallest completed building in the city. Shenzhen's high-rise building boom shows no signs of slowing down, with numerous proposals for skyscrapers taller than 150 m (492 ft).

Skyscraper construction started in Shenzhen in 1978, at a time when the tallest building in the city was five stories tall. In the next decade, 300 high-rises were erected in the city, including the Guomao Building. It was the city's first skyscraper and was the tallest building in mainland China upon its opening in 1985. As Shenzhen's highrise construction boom progressed into the 1990s, the skyscrapers erected in the city became taller. In the decade spanning from 1996 to 2006, 18 buildings taller than 200 m (656 ft) were completed. The tallest of these is the Diwang Building (Shun Hing Square), the city's first building to exceed 300 m (984 ft) in height. Most of Shenzhen's skyscrapers are concentrated in the Luohu, Futian and Nanshan districts. Shenzhen's skyscraper boom is attributed to its status as one of the fastest-growing cities in the world.

== Tallest buildings ==
This lists ranks Shenzhen skyscrapers that stand at least 200 m (655 feet) tall, based on standard height measurement. This includes spires and architectural details but does not include antenna masts. Buildings that have already topped out are also included.

Was the tallest building in Shenzhen upon completion

Rank	Name	Image	Height m (ft)	Floors	Year	District	Coordinates	Notes
1	Ping An Finance Center		599.1 m (1,966 ft)	118	2017	Futian	22°32′11″N 114°03′02″E	Also known as PAFC, the world's tallest office tower. Tallest building in Futian District, 2nd-tallest building in China and 5th-tallest building in the world. It also share the record (along with the Shanghai Tower) of having world's highest observation deck in a building at 562 m (1,844 ft).
2	KK100		441.8 m (1,449 ft)	100	2011	Luohu	22°32′48″N 114°06′07″E	Formerly known as the Kingkey 100. Tallest building in Luohu District and Shennan East Road, 14th-tallest building in China and 26th-tallest building in the world. The building has a height-width ratio of 9.5:1, thus becoming one of China's slimmest buildings.
3	China Merchants Bank Tower Global HQ		393 m (1,289 ft)	77	2025	Nanshan	22.525362°N 113.965205°E	Topped out in 2024 and completed in 2025. Tallest building in Nanshan District, 23rd-tallest building in China and 45th-tallest building in the world. Upon completion, replaced the China Merchants Bank Tower as the new headquarters of China Merchants Bank.
4	China Resources Headquarters		392.5 m (1,288 ft)	68	2018	Nanshan	22°31′01″N 113°56′30″E	Colloquially known as the Spring Bamboo (Chinese: 春笋). Tallest building in Houhai Bay and the 21st-tallest building in China. A notable feature is its advanced Hitachi elevator system. At the time of its completion, it was only the third building in the world to be equipped with Hitachi's FIBEE destination dispatch technology, which groups passengers into specific elevator cars to reduce wait and travel times.
5	Citymark Centre		388.3 m (1,274 ft)	70	2022	Luohu	22°33′39.5″N 114°6′0.3″E	Also known as Citimark Center, Structurally Topped out in 2021. Estimated Completion in 2022.
6	Shum Yip Upperhills Tower 1		388.1 m (1,273 ft)	80	2020	Futian	22°33′31″N 114°03′58″E	This is one of the tower to take advantage of the large area, creating two artificial mountain volumes, in response to the huge scale of the towers. 23rd-tallest building in China.
7	Shun Hing Square		384 m (1,260 ft)	69	1996	Luohu	22°32′43″N 114°06′21″E	Also known as the Diwang Building. The first supertall building to be constructed within the Luohu District and becoming the tallest all-steel building in China. 25th-tallest building in China. Briefly the tallest building in China until completion of the CITIC Plaza in Guangzhou.
8	Dabaihui Plaza		375.6 m (1,232 ft)	70	2021	Futian	22°32′20″N 114°03′32″E	Also known as the Shenzhen Center. (mainly by non-Shenzheners). 29th-tallest building in China. The tower, with its columnar outline and layered form, represents the high-quality urban visage of Shenzhen, China's design capital.
9	Huiyun Center		359.2 m (1,178 ft)	80	2023	Nanshan	22°31′36.87″N 113°57′55.23″E	Structurally Topped out in 2020. Estimated Completion in 2022. Formerly known as Shenzhen Bay Huiyun Center (深湾汇云中心). Being the tallest building in Qianhai at Nanshan District.
10	Hanking Center		358.9 m (1,177 ft)	65	2018	Nanshan	22°32′37″N 113°55′54″E	Tallest detached-core tower in the world. Tallest building in Shennan Boulevard, 37th-tallest building in China. Defined by its detached core configuration, the building positions its primary core 9 meters outside its main body.
11 =	Galaxy World Tower 1		356 m (1,168 ft)	71	2023	Longgang	22°21′46″N 114°19′18″E	The first supertall building to be constructed within the Longgang District. Structurally Topped out in 2021. Estimated Completion in 2023 and will become the tallest twin towers in China.
11 =	Galaxy World Tower 2		356 m (1,168 ft)	71	2023	Longgang	22°21′46″N 114°19′18″E	Structurally Topped out in 2021. Estimated Completion in 2023.
13	One Shenzhen Bay Tower 7		341.4 m (1,120 ft)	71	2018	Nanshan	22°30′31″N 113°56′14″E	The tower has the world's highest conference hall, which is used for various musical and entertainment performances.
14	Shenzhen Urban Construction & Tower		333 m (1,093 ft)	72	2024	Luohu	22°32′16″N 114°06′20″E	Structurally Topped Out in late 2022.
15	Hon Kwok City Center		329.4 m (1,081 ft)	80	2017	Futian	22°32′30″N 114°04′29″E	Tallest and the first supertall building to be constructed in Huaqiangbei subdistrict (excluding antenna) and Shennan Middle Road.
16	Baoneng Center		327.3 m (1,074 ft)	65	2019	Luohu	22°32′52″N 114°06′15″E	The tower's facade adopts a full glass curtain wall structure with different textures to create a light and stylish overall image.
17	Shenzhen Bay Innovation and Technology Centre Tower 1		311.1 m (1,021 ft)	69	2020	Nanshan	22°31′53″N 113°56′29″E	One of the tallest twin towers in Shenzhen. The twin towers are connected by two distinctive 3-storey volumes at different heights; these volumes provide ancillary programs and services to the office users and visitors alike.
18	Hengyu Jinrong Center Block A		310 m (1,017 ft)	66	2024	Nanshan		Structurally Topped Out in late 2022.
19	Nanshan Science and Technology Union Building		309 m (1,014 ft)	67	2025	Nanshan		Structurally Topped Out in late 2025.
20	East Pacific Business Center Tower A		306 m (1,004 ft)	85	2013	Futian	22°32′18″N 114°0′51″E	Tower was among the tallest residential buildings in China and stands as the tallest building in Xiangmihu Subdistrict . Tower A is linked with Tower B through a multi-level skybridge positioned at a height of 170 meters above the ground.
21	Shenzhen CFC Changfu Centre		304.3 m (998 ft)	68	2015	Futian	22°30′33″N 114°03′03″E	The first supertall building to be constructed within the Bonded Zone and standing among the first line buildings to be seen when viewing Shenzhen from Hong Kong immediately to the south.
22	Guangdong Landmark Tower		303 m (994 ft)	62	2023	Nanshan		Also known as Yuehai Landmark Tower.
23	Zhongzhou Holdings Financial Center		300.8 m (987 ft)	61	2015	Nanshan	22°31′14″N 113°55′43″E	The first supertall building to be constructed in Shenzhen’s Nanshan District and became new focal point for the skyline within this distant southwestern portion of the city.
24	OCT Tower		300 m (984 ft)	60	2020	Nanshan	22°32′15″N 113°58′39″E	The tower shape and location are restricted by the solar constraints. To minimise shading impact on surrounding residential properties, the footprint is designed as a 107-107-107-39 diamond-shape.
25	Shum Yip Upperhills Tower 2		299.3 m (982 ft)	62	2017	Futian	22°33′29″N 114°03′58″E	Topped out in 2016. Completed in 2017.
26	Shimao Qianhai Centre		294.3 m (966 ft)	62	2020	Nanshan		Topped out in 2019. Completed in 2020.
27 =	Riverfront Times Square		293 m (961 ft)	64	2016	Futian	22°31′49″N 114°01′24″E	Topped out in 2015. Completed in 2016.
27 =	Qianhai Horoy Tower		293 m (961 ft)	62	2022	Nanshan		Architecturally Topped out in 2021. Estimated Completion in 2022.
29	SEG Plaza		291.6 m (957 ft)	71	2000	Futian	22°32′37″N 114°04′52″E	Originally stood 356 metres (1,168 ft) tall including the height of the original antenna which has since been removed. Tallest building constructed in Shenzhen in the 2000s.
30	China Resources Qianhai Center 1		291.5 m (956 ft)	65	2021	Nanshan		Architecturally topped out in 2020. Completed in 2021.
31 =	C Future City East Tower		290.8 m (954 ft)	62	2022	Nanshan		Architecturally Topped out in 2021. Estimated Completion in 2022.
31 =	C Future City West Tower		290.8 m (954 ft)	62	2022	Nanshan		Architecturally Topped out in 2021. Estimated Completion in 2022.
33	China Chuneng Tower		288.6 m (947 ft)	62	2016	Nanshan	22°32′27″N 113°56′24″E	
34 =	Huaxun Center		286 m (938 ft)	70	2018	Luohu		
34 =	Ping An Finance Center South		286 m (938 ft)	51	2019	Futian		
36	One Excellence Tower 1		283.8 m (931 ft)	62	2019	Nanshan		
37	Excellence Century Plaza Tower 1		280 m (919 ft)	60	2010	Futian		
38 =	Shenzhen Bay Ecocity B-Tech Tower 1		273 m (896 ft)	58	2018	Nanshan		
38 =	NEO Tower A		273 m (896 ft)	56	2011	Futian		Formerly known as Lvjing Plaza (绿景广场)
40	Kaisa City Plaza		270 m (886 ft)	52	2022	Longgang		
41	Shenzhen Metro Che Kung Temple Hub		268.8 m (882 ft)	55	2019	Futian	22°32′14″N 114°01′02″E	
42	Zhaoxin Huijimn Center Tower A		262 m (860 ft)	51	2022	Futian		
43	East Pacific Business Center Tower B		261 m (856 ft)	72	2013	Futian	22°32′19″N 114°00′52″E	
44	Bojin Business Plaza Tower 1		260.9 m (856 ft)	53	2019	Futian	22°31′55″N 114°01′21″E	Also known as Dahanwang Tower 1
45	Shenzhen Special Zone Press Tower		260 m (853 ft)	48	1998	Futian	22°32′37″N 114°02′25″E	
46	OCT One		259 m (850 ft)	57	2019	Nanshan		
47	Qianhai Financial Centre T1		258.8 m (849 ft)	57	2021	Nanshan		
48	Huide Tower		258 m (846 ft)	58	2019	Longhua		
49 =	Hengyu Jinrong Center Block B		258 m (846 ft)	51	2023	Nanshan		
49 =	Hengyu Jinrong Center Block C		258 m (846 ft)	51	2023	Nanshan		
51	AVIC Plaza		254 m (833 ft)	52	2012	Futian	22°32′37″N 114°04′38″E	
52	Wongtee Plaza		253.6 m (832 ft)	65	2016	Futian		
52 =	Excellence Century Plaza Tower 2		250 m (820 ft)	57	2010	Futian		
54 =	Clay Innovation Square		250 m (820 ft)	54	2022	Nanshan	22°31′01″N 113°56′28″E	Also known as Hongtu Innovation Plaza
55 =	China Merchants Bank Tower		249 m (817 ft)	53	2001	Futian	22°32′23″N 114°0′58″E	
55 =	Shenzhen University Subway Station Tower		249 m (817 ft)	51	2017	Nanshan		
57	Shenzhen Bay Innovation and Technology Centre Tower 2		247.2 m (811 ft)	53	2020	Nanshan	22°31′55″N 113°56′29″E	
58	Andaz Shenzhen Bay		246 m (807 ft)	58	2021	Nanshan	22°31′02″N 113°56′31″E	
59 =	Tencent Binhai Mansion Tower 1		245.8 m (806 ft)	50	2017	Nanshan	22°31′32″N 113°55′50″E	
59 =	Shenzhen Stock Exchange Plaza		245.8 m (806 ft)	46	2013	Futian		
61	Shenzhen Bay Ecocity B-Tech Tower 2		245 m (804 ft)	54	2018	Nanshan		
62	Vanke Yun City		243.8 m (800 ft)	56	2019	Nanshan		
63	China Resources Qianhai Center Tower 5		242.3 m (795 ft)	53	2021	Nanshan		
64	Shenzhen Broadcasting Center Building		240.7 m (790 ft)	48	2001	Futian		
65 =	Panglin Plaza		240 m (787 ft)	57	2000	Luohu		
65 =	Shenzhen Qianhai Tencent Headquarters Tower 1		240 m (787 ft)		2022	Nanshan		
67	New Wall Street Tower		239 m (784 ft)	67	2022	Futian		
68	New World Center		238 m (781 ft)	53	2006	Futian		
69	Shuibei Jewelry Headquarters Tower A		232.3 m (762 ft)	48	2018	Luohu		
70 =	Shenzhen Media Group Tower		232 m (761 ft)	51	2021	Futian		
70 =	CASC International Center North Tower		232 m (761 ft)	50	2015	Nanshan		also known as The China Aerospace Science and Technology Corporation Tower
72	China Resources Dachong Redevelopment Tower 1		231 m (758 ft)	47	2018	Nanshan		
73	Lihe Tower		230.9 m (758 ft)	48	2017	Futian		
74 =	SEG-Hitachi Industrial Park Redevelopment Tower 1A		230.4 m (756 ft)	62	2015	Futian		
74 =	SEG-Hitachi Industrial Park Redevelopment Tower 2A		230.4 m (756 ft)	62	2015	Futian		
76 =	Rongchao Headquarters Tower		230 m (755 ft)	54	2017	Nanshan		
76 =	Satellite Communication Operations Building		230 m (755 ft)	47	2022	Futian		
76 =	China Construction Bank Building 2		230 m (755 ft)	40	2020	Futian		
79 =	Golden Business Center		228 m (748 ft)	50	2004	Luohu		Also known as the Shanglong Building
79 =	Guosen Securities Tower		228 m (748 ft)	50	2019	Futian		
79 =	Taiping Finance Tower		228 m (748 ft)	48	2014	Futian		
82	Kuantan-Chi Future Center Block A		226.7 m (744 ft)	46	2021	Nanshan		
83 =	Coastal Center		225 m (738 ft)	46	2017	Nanshan		
83 =	UNI-Center Tower A		225 m (738 ft)	46	2017	Nanshan		
83 =	Jinlitong Financial Center 1		225 m (738 ft)	46	2018	Bao'an		
83 =	Jinlitong Financial Center 2		225 m (738 ft)	46	2018	Bao'an		
87	China Resources Qianhai Center Tower 2		224.3 m (736 ft)	49	2021	Nanshan		
88	World Finance Center Tower A		222.4 m (730 ft)	54	2003	Luohu		
89 =	Nanyou Tower 1		220.8 m (724 ft)	39	2018	Nanshan		
89 =	Nanyou Tower 2		220.8 m (724 ft)	49	2021	Nanshan		
91 =	Pengguangda Tower		220 m (722 ft)	58	2021	Yantian		
91 =	Vanke One City Office Tower		220 m (722 ft)	51	2019	Yantian		
91 =	Shuiwan 1979		220 m (722 ft)	47	2016	Nanshan		
94	Sino Life Insurance Building		219 m (719 ft)	49	2016	Futian		
95 =	Hung Cheung Plaza		218 m (715 ft)	63	2004	Luohu		
95 =	Times Fortune Building		218 m (715 ft)	54	2008	Futian		
95 =	Times Square Excellence		218 m (715 ft)	52	2006	Futian		
95 =	Shenzhen Energy Headquarters North Tower		218 m (715 ft)	43	2017	Futian		
95 =	China Resources Dachong Redevelopment Tower 2		218 m (715 ft)	42	2018	Nanshan		
100	AVIC Center Office Tower		216.4 m (710 ft)	41	2013	Futian		
101	International Chamber of Commerce Tower		216 m (709 ft)	55	2005	Futian		
102	DJI Sky City Tower 2		213 m (699 ft)	47	2022	Nanshan		
103	Sinotrans Logistic Centre		212.8 m (698 ft)	48	2020	Futian		
104	Shenzhen Gemdale Viseen South Tower		211.5 m (694 ft)	45	2021	Nanshan		Also known as Weixin Software Science and Technology Park Phase III South Tower
105	Longgang Jiuzuan Block 5B		211.3 m (693 ft)	46	2021	Longgang		
106 =	Vanke Times Square		211 m (692 ft)	47	2019	Longgang		
106 =	China Merchants Tower		211 m (692 ft)	37	2013	Nanshan		
108	Hengmingzhu Financial Building		210.6 m (691 ft)		2020	Bao'an		
109 =	Ziyuanyuan Tower		210 m (689 ft)	47	2020	Futian		
109 =	Excellence Houhai Financial Center		210 m (689 ft)	46	2015	Nanshan		
109 =	CNOOC New Tower 1		210 m (689 ft)	45	2016	Nanshan		
109 =	CNOOC New Tower 2		210 m (689 ft)	45	2016	Nanshan		
113	Horizon Skyline Garden Office Tower		209.2 m (686 ft)	44	2017	Nanshan		
114	Ping An Asset Tower		208.5 m (684 ft)	39	2022	Futian		
115	Greater China World Financial Center Tower 1		208.2 m (683 ft)	44	2021	Luohu		
116 =	Jiangsu Tower		208 m (682 ft)	52	2001	Futian		
116 =	Wenbo Tower		208 m (682 ft)	48	2016	Futian		
116 =	Southern Bosera Building		208 m (682 ft)	42	2018	Futian		
119 =	Landmark		206 m (676 ft)	52	2007	Futian		
119 =	East Pacific Business Center Tower C		206 m (676 ft)	40	2010	Futian		
121	HBC Huilong Center		205.5 m (674 ft)	47	2019	Longhua		
122	COFCO Yunjing Centre		205 m (673 ft)	47	2019	Nanshan		
123	Prince Plaza		204.8 m (672 ft)	42	2019	Nanshan		
124	Kexunkexueyuan Tower D2		204.2 m (670 ft)	42	2019	Nanshan		
125	New Century Plaza West Tower		204 m (669 ft)	46	2003	Luohu		
126	Shenzhen Venture Capital – Private Enterprise Tower		202.4 m (664 ft)	44	2016	Nanshan		
127 =	Shenzhen Media Group Building		202 m (663 ft)	43	2021	Futian		
127 =	Regency Hotel		202 m (663 ft)	42	2021	Luohu		
129	Bojin Business Plaza Tower 2		201.7 m (662 ft)	41	2019	Futian		Also known as Dahanwang Tower 2
130 =	Guotong Building		201 m (659 ft)	49	1997	Futian		
130 =	Futian Technology Plaza Tower 1		201 m (659 ft)	43	2013	Futian		
130 =	China Resources Dachong Redevelopment Tower 3		201 m (659 ft)	40	2018	Nanshan		
133	China Resources Qianhai Center Tower 4		200.8 m (659 ft)	49	2021	Nanshan		
134	Jinzhonghuan International Business Building		200.5 m (658 ft)	50	2006	Futian		This building is also known as the Golden Center International Business Mansion.
135	One Excellence Tower 3		200.4 m (657 ft)	43	2019	Nanshan		
136 =	OCT Innovation Tower		200 m (656 ft)	46	2021	Nanshan		
136 =	SF Express Headquarter Building		200 m (656 ft)	45	2019	Nanshan		
136 =	Centralcon Group Tower		200 m (656 ft)	43	2016	Futian		
136 =	Shenzhen Kerry Center Phase 2		200 m (656 ft)	42	2012	Futian		
136 =	Das Intellitech Headquarters		200 m (656 ft)	40	2018	Nanshan		
141	CLP Great Wall Building South Tower		199.6 m (655 ft)	39	2019	Nanshan		

=== Tallest buildings by district ===
This lists the tallest building in each district of Shenzhen stand at least 200 metres based on standard height measurement.

Rank		Name	Height	Floors	District of Shenzhen	Completion
	List	Name	Height	Floors	District of Shenzhen	Completion
1	1	Ping An Finance Center	599.1 m (1,966 ft)	115	Futian	2017
2	2	KK100	441.8 m (1,449 ft)	100	Luohu	2011
3	3	China Resources Headquarters	392.5 m (1,288 ft)	68	Nanshan	2018
4	10	Galaxy World Tower	356 m (1,168 ft)	71	Longgang	2023
5	42	Huide Tower	258 m (846 ft)	58	Longhua	2019
6	75=	Jinlitong Financial Center	225 m (738 ft)	46	Bao'an	2018
7	83=	Vanke One City Office Tower	220 m (720 ft)	51	Yantian	2019

=== Tallest buildings by function ===
This lists the tallest buildings in Shenzhen by their respective functions—office, hotel, residential and mixed-use—based on standard height measurement.

Rank		Name	Height	Floors	Function	Completion
	List	Name	Height	Floors	Function	Completion
1	1	Ping An Finance Center	599.1 m (1,966 ft)	115	Office	2017
2	2	KK100	441.8 m (1,449 ft)	100	Mixed-use	2011
3	16	East Pacific Center Tower A	306 m (1,004 ft)	85	Residential	2013
4	50	Andaz Shenzhen Bay	246 m (807 ft)	58	Hotel	2021

== Tallest under construction or proposed ==
This lists buildings that are under construction in Shenzhen with at least 150m (492 feet) in height.

Name	Height m / ft	Floors	Year*	Notes
Shenzhen Bay Super Headquarters Base Tower C-1	394 / 1293	78	2027	
China Merchants Bank Global Headquarters Main Tower	393 / 1289	77	2025	
Shenzhen Luohu Friendship Trading Center	380 / 1246	83	2026	
China Merchants Prince Bay Tower	374 / 1227	59	2028	
China Resources Huafu Tower	358 / 1173	?	2025	
Shenzhen Bay Super Headquarters Base Tower C-2	356 / 1167	68	2027	
CITIC Financial Center Tower 1	312 / 1024		2024	
Hengyu Jinrong Center Block A	310 / 1017	66	2023	
Nanshan Science and Technology Union Building	307.2 / 1008		2026	
Guangdong Landmark Building	303.2 / 994	62	2023	
Luen Thai International Center Tower 1	300 / 980			
China Horoy Qianhai Guanze Office Tower 1	293 / 961	62	2022	
Centralcon Shangsha Project 1	290 / 952	62	2022	
Centralcon Shangsha Project 2	290 / 952	62	2022	
China Resources Land Headquarters	288 / 945	76	2023	
Qianhai Shenzhen-Hong Kong Development Project	285 / 935	64	2020	
One Excellence Tower 1	284 / 931	62	2021	
Anbang Insurance Headquarters	273 / 895	54	2024	
Shenzhen Metro Che Kung Temple Hub	269 / 882	55	2020	
CR Capital Holdings Headquarter Building	265 / 869	58	2020	
Qianhai Financial Centre - T1	261 / 856	58		
Dahanwang Project Tower 1	260 / 853	53	2020	
Hengli International Office Building	250 / 820	45	2024	
Huanggang Port Comprehensive Business Building	247 / 810	50	2025	
China Resources Qianhai Center 5	242 / 794	55	2018	
Shuibei Jewelry Headquarters	240 / 787		2018	
China Venture Capital Building A	239 / 782		2024	
China Resources Dachong Redevelopment Tower 2	231 / 758		2018	
Genzon Times Center 1	230 / 755			
Genzon Times Center 2	230 / 755			
China Resources Qianhai Center 7	230 / 755		2018	
China Resources Qianhai Center 2	224 / 736	51	2018	
Sino Life Insurance Building	219 / 719		2018	
Shenzhen International Energy Mansion North Tower	218 / 715	44	2019	
CNOOC New Tower 1	210 / 689	45	2019	
CNOOC New Tower 2	210 / 689	45	2019	
Prince Plaza	209 / 686	42	2020	
Southern Bosera Building	208 / 682	41	2018	
Wenbo Tower	208 / 682	48	2018	
Binjiang Business District Tower 1	202 / 663	42	2024	
Shenzhen Venture Capital Building	202 / 664	44	2019	
China Resources Qianhai Center 4	201 / 659	49	2018	
Baoneng City 1	200 / 656		2019	
Baoneng City 2	200 / 656		2019	
Centralcon Group Tower	200 / 656	43	2019	
Excellence Meilin Project Tower 1	200 / 656		2018	
Excellence Meilin Project Tower 2	200 / 656		2018	
Longgang Tianan Cyberpark Project Phase 4	200 / 656		2018	
Shekou Taizi Commercial Plaza	200 / 656	42	2019	
Wingtech 5G South China Headquarters	199 / 653	48	2026	
China Resources Sungang Project Tower 1	198 / 649		2023	T/O
China Resources Sungang Project North Tower	196 / 643		2023	T/O
China Resources Sungang Project South Tower	196 / 643		2023	T/O
Kangtai Group Building	194 / 636	36	2023	T/O
China Taiping Insurance International Headquarters	192 / 629		2024	
Qianhai Xinhua Insurance Building	191 / 626	40	2024	
Antosan Headquarters	191 / 626	39	2022	Completed February 2, 2022
One Shenzhen Bay T5	190 / 623	46	2019	
Longhua Digital Building	190 / 623	37	2025	
Houhai Industrial and Commercial Bank Building	189 / 620	41	2022	Completed October 14, 2022
Qianhai Zhaolian Building	188 / 616	39	2025	
COFCO Joy Plaza	187 / 613	41	2024	
Shenzhen International Low-Carbon City Convention and Exhibition Center	185 / 606	39	2025	
Evergrande Metropolitan Plaza	183 / 600	39	2024	
Gemdale Gangxia Project Tower 2	180 / 591		2019	
Sunac Peace Center Tower 1	180 / 591	38	2024	
Hongfa Tianhui City Tower 1	180 / 591		2023	T/O
Yuhong Building	180 / 591	30	2022	Completed November 2, 2022
Zhouhezhuang Building	180 / 591	39	2025	
Guangfeng Technology Headquarters Building	180 / 591		2025	
Qianhai Huaqiang Headquarters Building	180 / 591		2023	T/O
Fucheng Times Square	174 / 570	38	2023	
China Resources Sungang Project Tower 2	170 / 557		2023	T/O
China Life Tower	165 / 541	35	2019	
China Resources Qianhai Center 3	164 / 540	32	2019	
Zhouhezhuang Building	162 / 531		2024	
Binjiang Business District Tower 2	160 / 525	33	2024	
Lepu International Building North	160 / 524		2023	T/O
Lepu International Building South	160 / 524		2023	T/O
Sunac Peace Center Tower 2	155 / 508	49	2024	
Guangfeng Technology Headquarters Building	155 / 508		2024	
Shenzhen Rural Commercial Bank Headquarters	150 / 492	41	2019	
Weiqiao Headquarters	150 / 492	33	2025	
Hongfa Tianhui City Tower 2	150 / 492		2023	T/O
Vivo Headquarters	150 / 492	32	2025	
Qianhai Chuangjin Hexin Building	150 / 492		2025	
Tianyin Building Tower 1	150 / 492		2026	
Anju Nanxinyuan Project Tower 1	150 / 492		2023	T/O
Anju Nanxinyuan Project Tower 2	150 / 492		2023	T/O
Bao'an Bay Industrial Investment Tower	150 / 492	37	2025	
Zhuoyue Boyi House Tower 1	150 / 492		2024	
Zhuoyue Boyi House Tower 2	150 / 492		2024	
Zhuoyue Boyi House Tower 3	150 / 492		2024	
Zhuoyue Boyi House Tower 4	150 / 492		2024	
CEC Vanke Shenzhen Bay Headquarters	150 / 492		2024	T/O
Qianhai Man Wah Holdings Headquarters	150 / 492		2027	

== Timeline of tallest buildings ==
Name	Photo	Street address	Years as tallest	Height m / ft	Floors	Reference
Electronics Building		2070 Shennan Middle Road, Futian	1981—1983	70 m (230 ft)	20	
Haifeng Yuan		3003 Renmin South Road, Luohu	1983—1985	96 m (315 ft)	33	
Guomao Building		3002 Renmin South Road, Luohu	1985—1990	160 m (525 ft)	50	
Shenzhen Development Center	on the left	5047 Shennan Road East, Luohu	1990—1996	165 m (541 ft)	43	
Shun Hing Square		5002 Shennan Road East, Luohu	1996—2011	384 m (1,260 ft)	69	
Kingkey 100		5016 Shennan Road East, Luohu	2011—2017	441.8 m (1,449 ft)	100	
Ping An Finance Center		16 Fuhua 4th Road, Futian	2017—present	599.2 m (1,966 ft)	115	

== See also ==
- List of tallest buildings in China
