= Shenzhen Bay Innovation and Technology Centre =

Skyscraper complex in Shenzhen, Guangdong, China

- 深圳湾创新科技中心
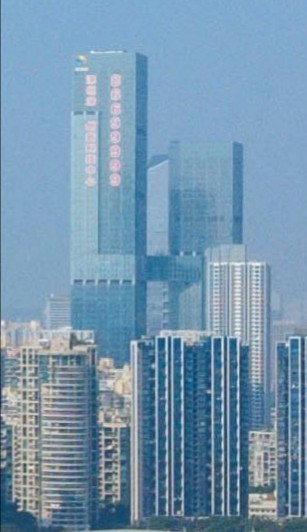
- Shenzhen Bay Innovation and Technology Centre Tower 1 & 2 in December 2020
- Interactive map of the Shenzhen Bay Innovation and Technology Centre area

General information
- Status: Completed
- Type: Office
- Location: 3156 Keyuan South Road, Nanshan District, Shenzhen, Guangdong, China
- Coordinates: 22°31′53″N 113°56′29″E
- Construction started: 2015
- Completed: 2020

Height
- Architectural: T1. 311.1 m (1,021 ft); T2. 247.2 m (811 ft); T3. 150 m (492 ft); T4. 120 m (394 ft); T5. 106 m (348 ft)
- Tip: T1. 311.1 m (1,021 ft); T2. 247.2 m (811 ft)
- Top floor: T1. 294.9 m (968 ft); T2. 231 m (758 ft)

Technical details
- Floor count: T1. 69; T2. 53; T3. 45; T4. 37; T5. 30
- Floor area: 381,529 m^{2} (4,106,744 sq ft)

Design and construction
- Architect: RMJM
- Developer: Shenzhen Zhongzhou Investment Holdings
- Main contractor: China Construction Second Building Group

Shenzhen Bay Innovation and Technology Centre is a group of skyscrapers in Shenzhen, Guangdong, China. The tallest tower (tower 1) has a height of 311.1 metres (1,021 ft). Construction on tower 1 began in 2015 and the building was completed in 2020.

== See also ==
- List of tallest buildings in Shenzhen
- List of tallest buildings in China
