= Citymark Center =

Skyscraper in Shenzhen, Guangdong, China

Citymark Centre
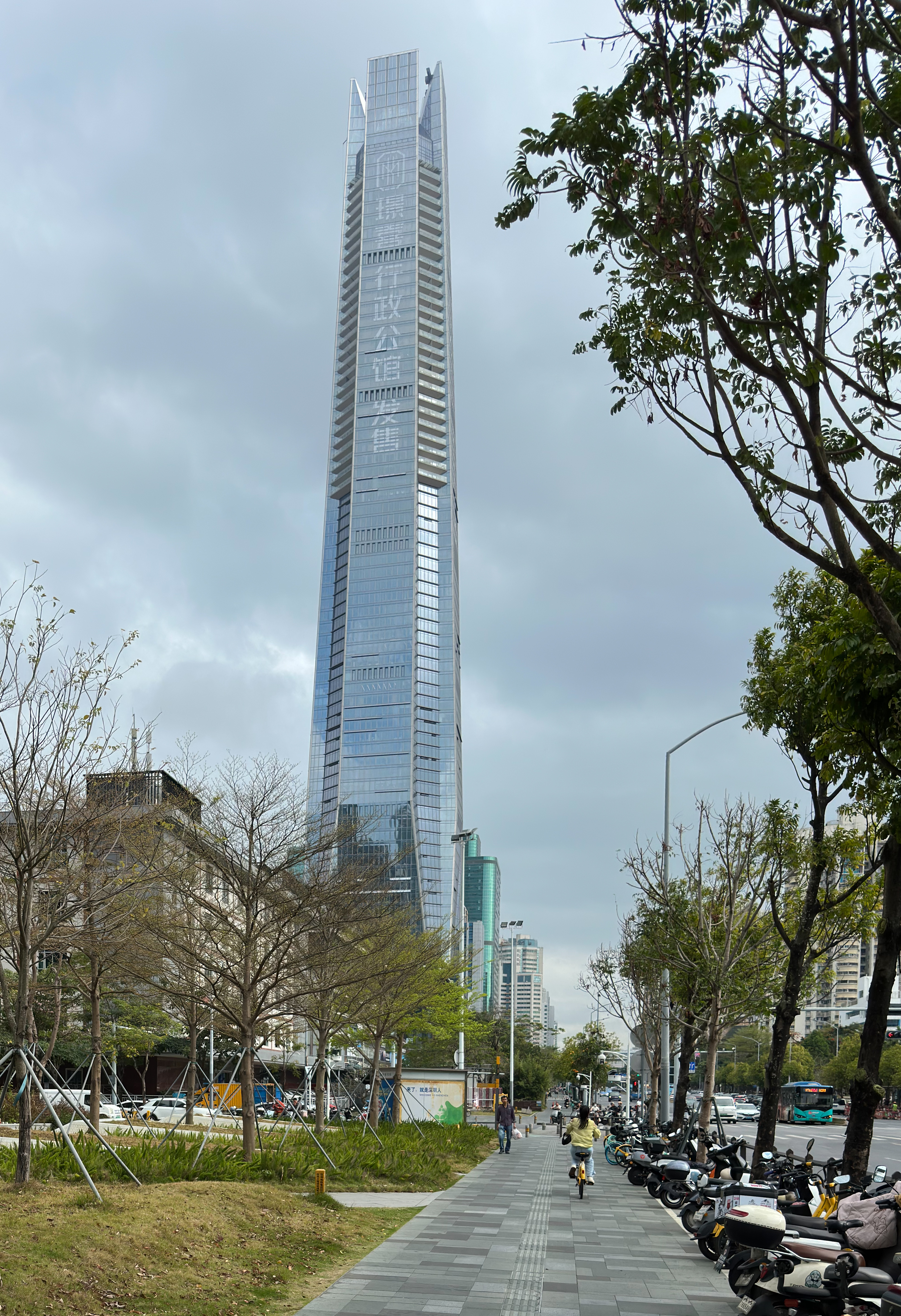
- Interactive map of the Citymark Centre area
- Alternative names: Chengmai Center

General information
- Status: Completed
- Type: Office, Residential
- Location: Luohu District, Shenzhen, Guangdong, China
- Coordinates: 22°33′39.5″N 114°6′0.3″E
- Construction started: 2018
- Completed: 2022
- Owner: Shenzhen Maiyuan Real Estate Co., Ltd

Height
- Architectural: 388.3 m (1,274 ft)
- Tip: 388.3 m (1,274 ft)

Technical details
- Floor count: 70

Design and construction
- Architect: Kohn Pedersen Fox
- Developer: Shenzhen Maiyuan Real Estate Co., Ltd
- Main contractor: China Construction Third Building Group

Citymark Center (Chinese: 城脉中心), also known as Chengmai Center and Citymark Financial Center, is a supertall skyscraper in Shenzhen, Guangdong, People's Republic of China. The building is 388 meters high and has 70 floors. Construction began in 2018 and was completed in 2022. The building was the tallest completed in China in 2022, and the second-tallest worldwide that year.

This mixed-use building, which includes both office space and apartments, also offers a range of other facilities. The aerodynamic design of the building is inspired by, among other things, sports cars. It has a broad base that becomes increasingly as the skyscraper gets taller. The building was designed by the American architectural firm Kohn Pedersen Fox from New York City. It is part of the larger Citymark Center, a complex of several buildings in the Luohu district of Shenzhen.

== See also ==
- List of tallest buildings
- List of tallest buildings in Shenzhen
- List of tallest buildings in China
