= Shenzhen CFC Changfu Centre =

Supertall skyscraper in Shenzhen, Guangdong, China

- CFC长富中心
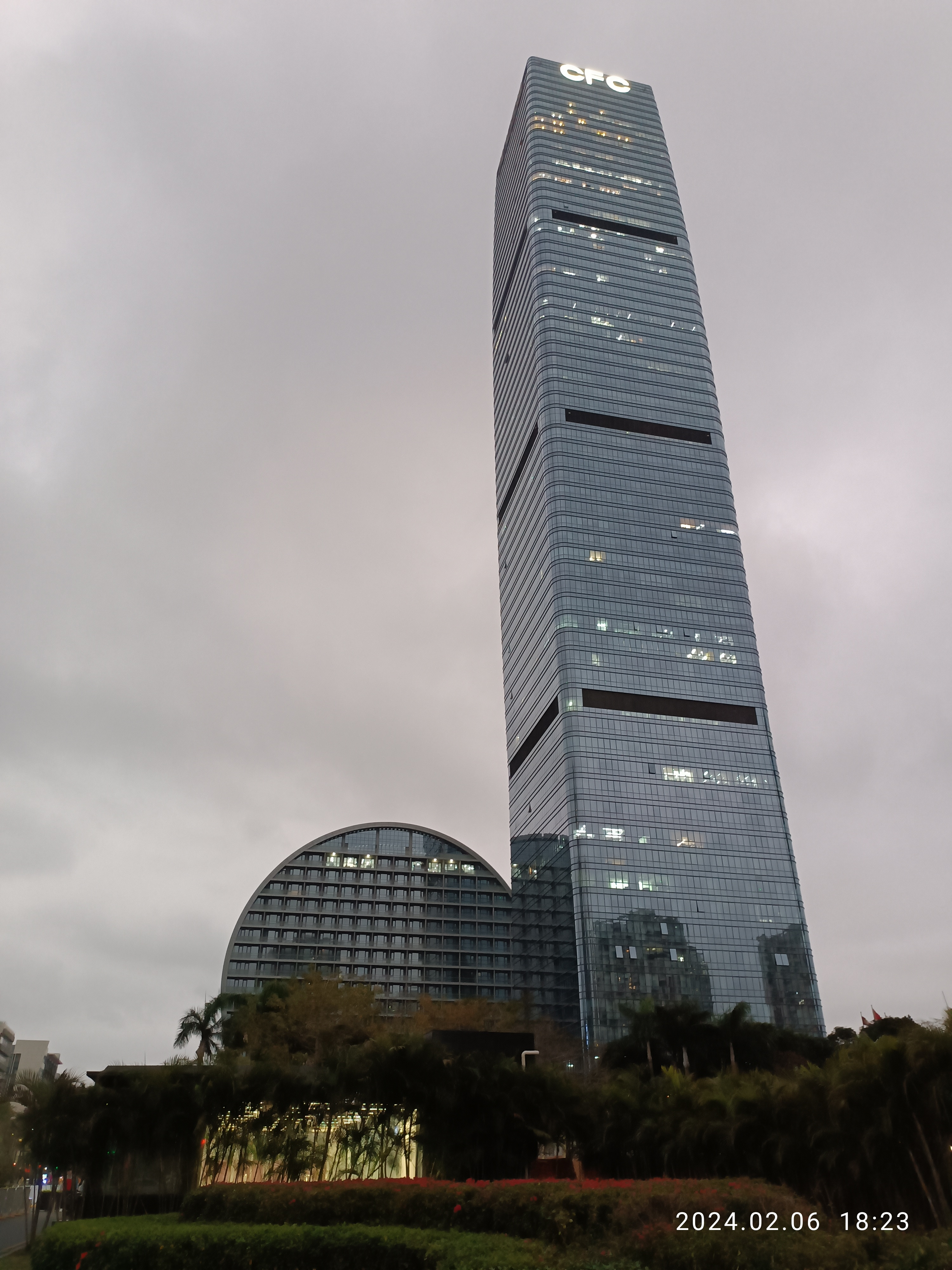
- The Shenzhen CFC Changfu Centre in June 2024
- Interactive map of the Shenzhen CFC Changfu Centre area
- Alternative names: CFC Tower (CFC长富中心)

General information
- Status: Completed
- Location: 5 Shihua Road, Futian District, Shenzhen, Guangdong, China
- Coordinates: 22°30′33″N 114°03′03″E
- Construction started: 2011
- Completed: 2015

Height
- Architectural: 304.3 m (998 ft)
- Tip: 304.3 m (998 ft)
- Top floor: 271 m (889 ft)

Technical details
- Floor count: 68
- Floor area: 206,400 m^{2} (2,221,671 sq ft)

Design and construction
- Architect: AUBE Design
- Main contractor: China Construction Second Building Group

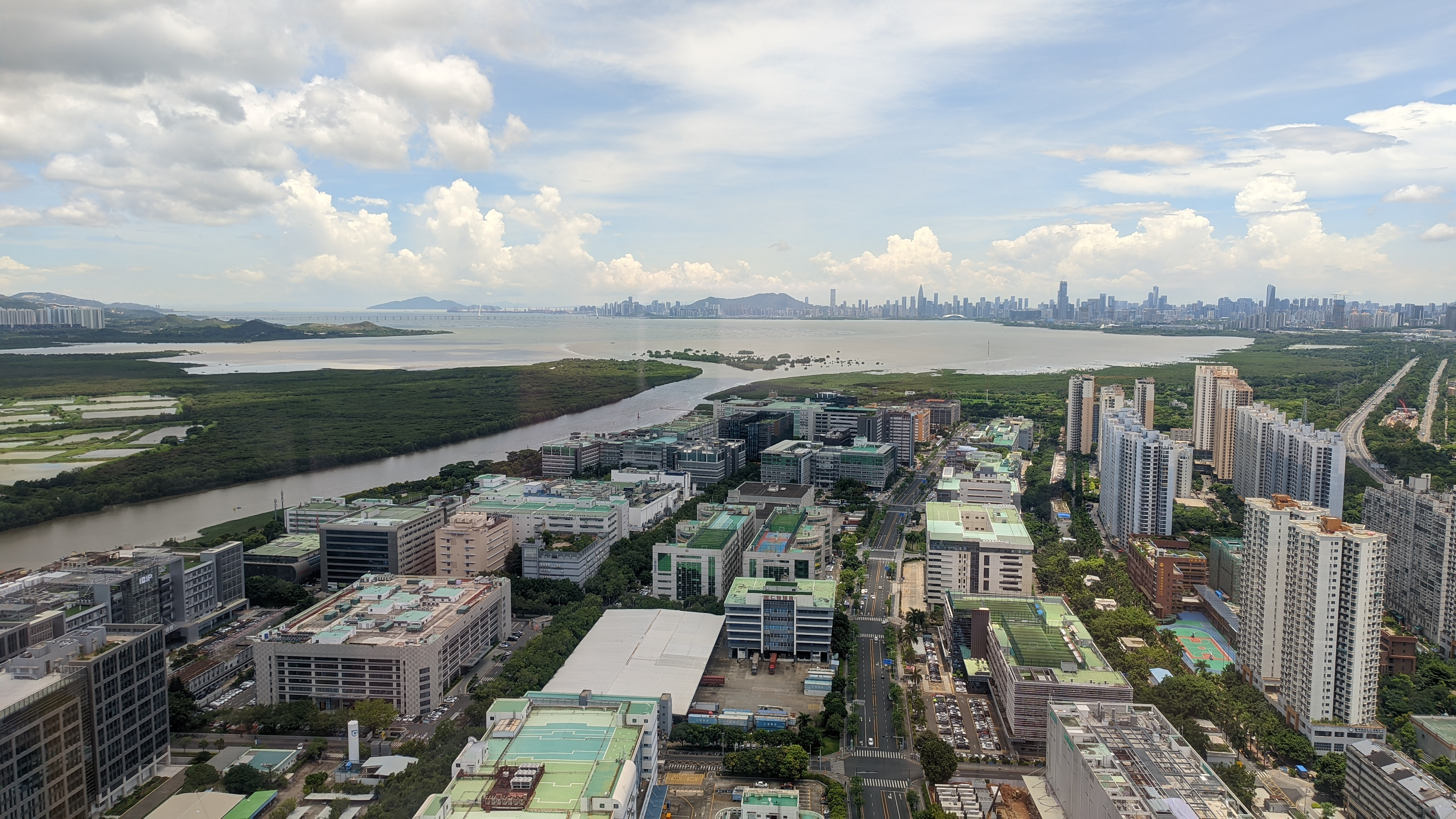
Overlook Shenzhen Bay from CFC

Shenzhen CFC Changfu Centre (Chinese: CFC长富中心) is a supertall skyscraper in Shenzhen, Guangdong, China. It is 304.3 metres (998.4 ft) tall. Construction started in 2011 and was completed in January 2016.

== See also ==
- List of tallest buildings in Shenzhen
- List of tallest buildings in China
