= New Century Plaza =

Skyscraper complex in Shenzhen, Guangdong, China

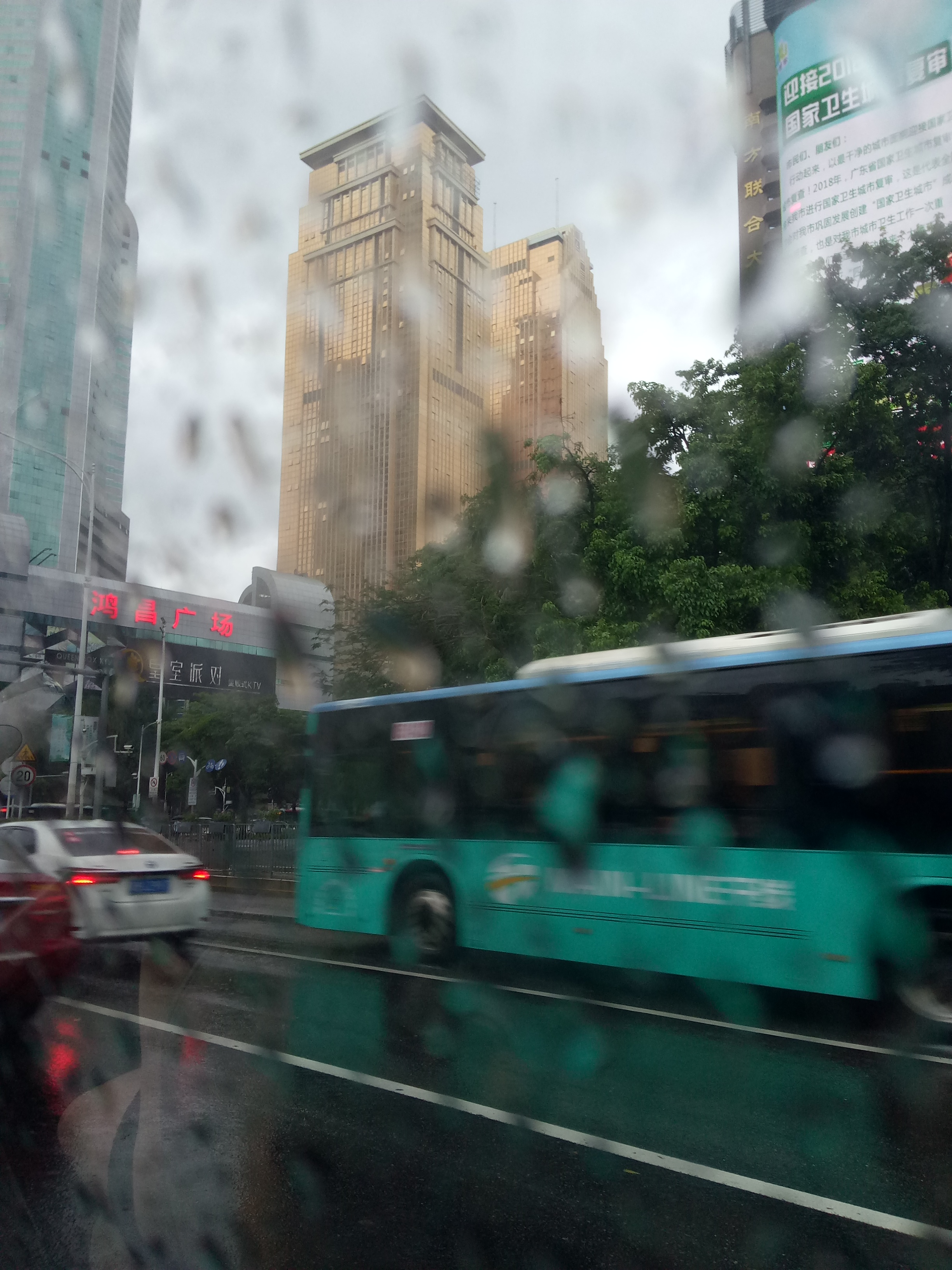
- View of the towers. The golden towers itself can be seen in the middle.

General information
- Status: Completed
- Type: Mixed use: Commercial offices, Apartments, hotels, Shops
- Location: 68 Shennan Boulevard, Shenzhen, China
- Construction started: 1993
- Completed: Summer 2016
- Opened: December 2016
- Owner: Vanke

Height
- Antenna spire: Tower B 204 m (669 ft)
- Roof: Tower A 192 m (630 ft)

Technical details
- Floor count: Tower A 45, Tower B 46. Both have 3 floors below ground

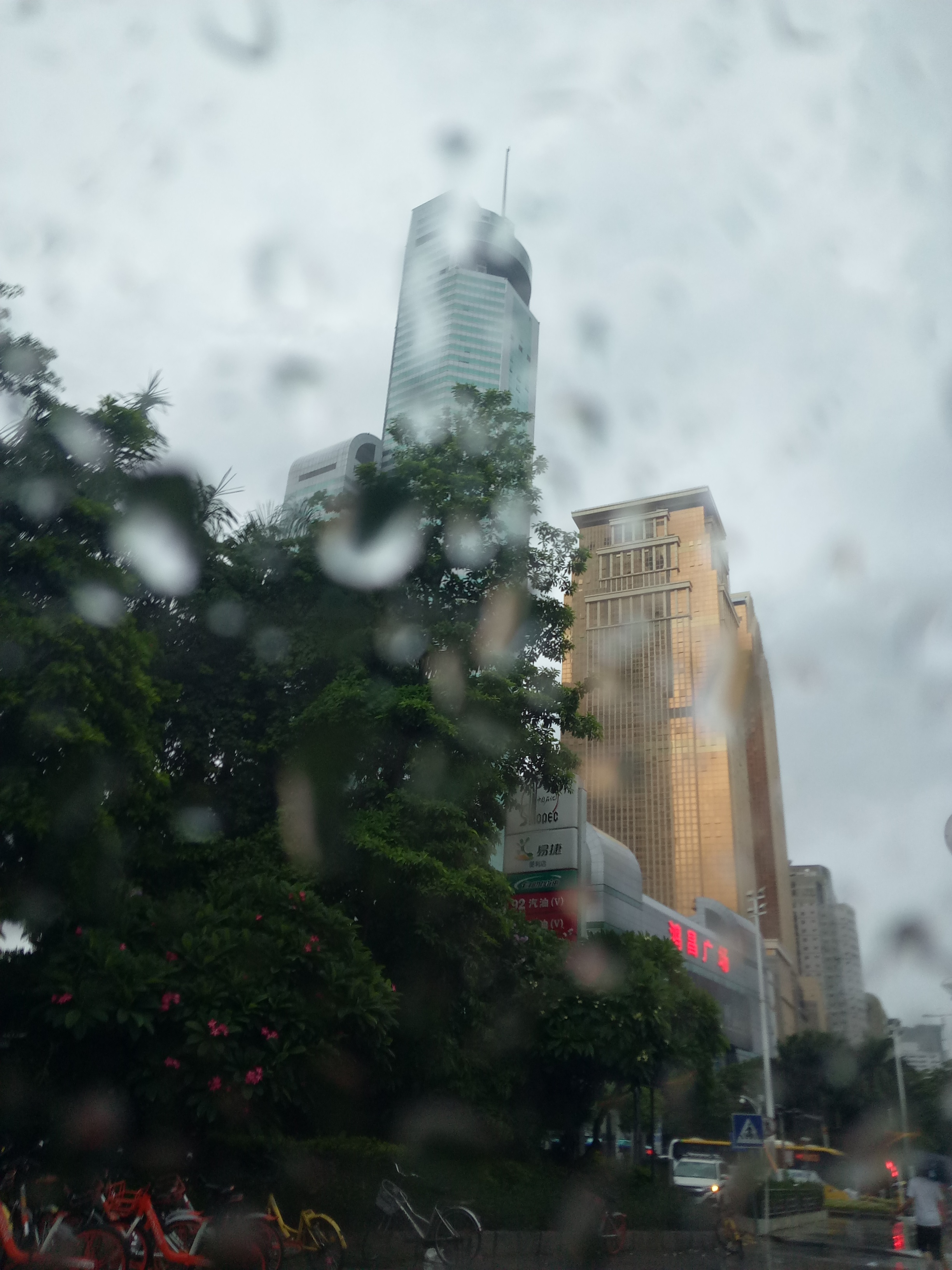
New Century Plaza taken Hung Cheong Plaza together.

New Century Plaza (Chinese: 新世纪广场), otherwise or formerly known as Xinshiji Plaza, or Zhengshun Plaza (Chinese: 正顺广场), are twin towers in Dongmen, Shenzhen, China. They are formal abandoned skyscrapers in Shenzhen. Its actual current name is Vanke 68th Shennan Boulevard (Chinese: 万科深南道68号), which is named after its address. Both of them stand more than 190 meters tall with 45/46 floors. Construction of the buildings started in 1998 and was topped out in 2000. The building features shops and restaurants in the lower decks while the upper decks contains offices, luxury apartments, and luxury hotel.

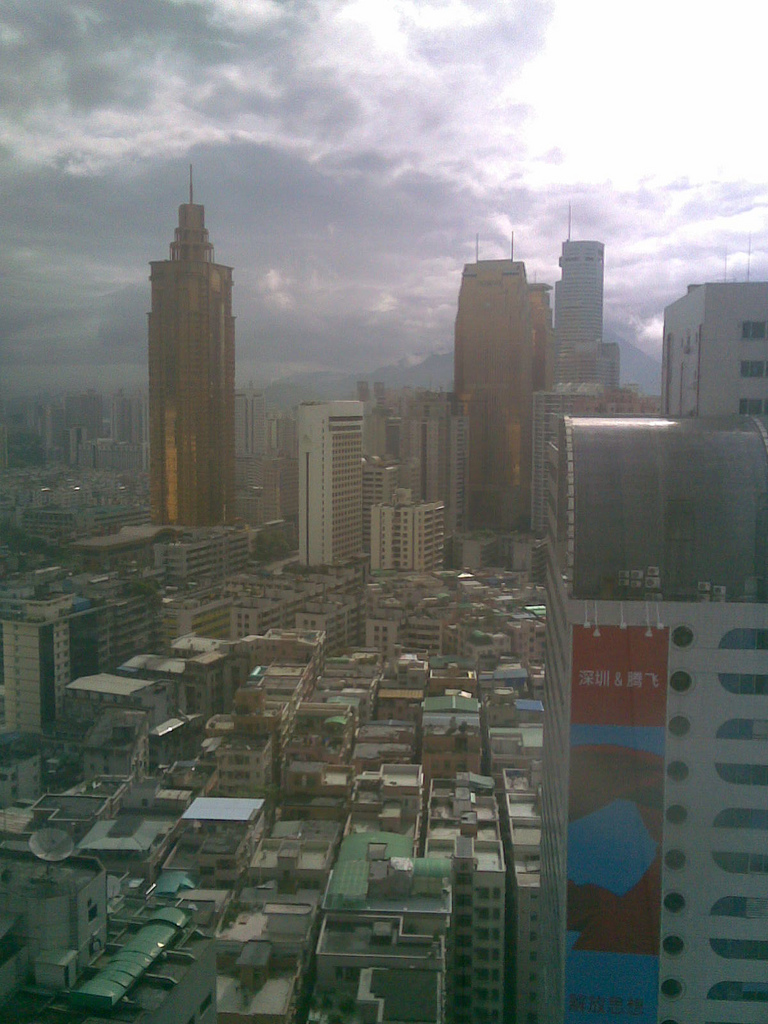
The Golden Business Center is to the left. New century Plaza and Hung Cheung Plaza are to the middle-right of this image.

The main structure and its distinctive 2 golden-coloured façades were largely completed when the developer abandoned the towers due to financial reasons in the same year. Construction halted for 13 years and renovation has only started after the building was sold to another developer in 2013. It was purchased by Vanke in 2015, who currently owns the building. The buildings had a fire after the purchase; fortunately, there were no reported casualties.

== See also ==
- List of tallest buildings in Shenzhen
