= Guomao Building =

Skyscraper in Shenzhen, Guangdong, China

Coordinates: 22.543038°N 114.114662°E

- 国贸大厦
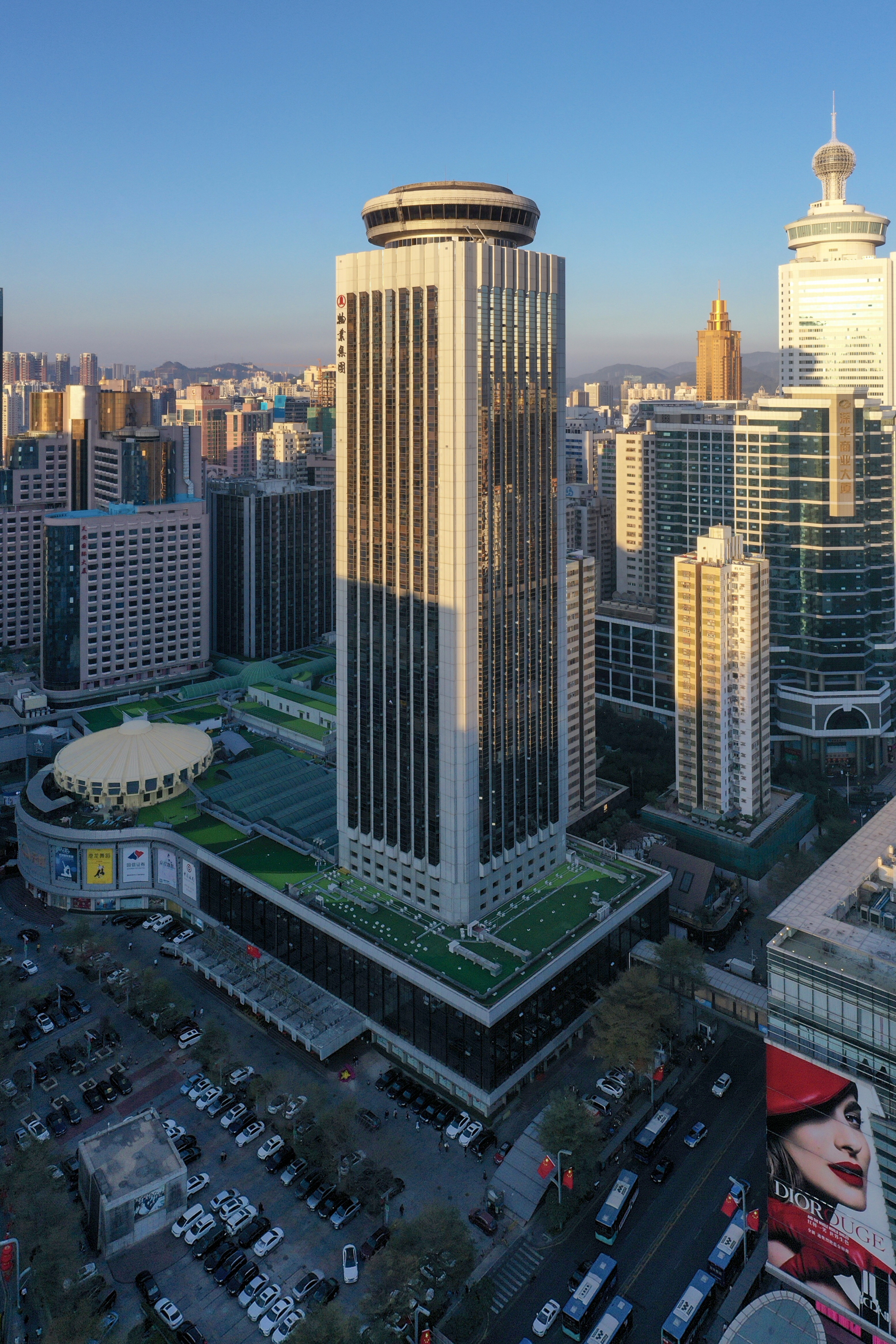
- The Guomao Building, Shenzhen in February 2021
- Interactive map of the Guomao Building area
- Alternative names: International Trade Centre

Record height
- Tallest in China from 29 December 1985 to 1987^{[I]}
- Preceded by: Baiyun Hotel
- Surpassed by: Shenzhen Development Center

General information
- Status: Completed
- Type: Skyscraper
- Location: Shenzhen, China
- Construction started: 1 November 1982
- Completed: 29 December 1985

Height
- Height: 160 m (524.9 ft)

Technical details
- Floor count: 50

Guomao Building
- Simplified Chinese: 国贸大厦
- Traditional Chinese: 國貿大廈
- Literal meaning: International Trade Centre Building
Transcriptions
Standard Mandarin
- Hanyu Pinyin: Guómào Dàshà
Yue: Cantonese
- Jyutping: gwok3 mau6 daai6 haa6

The Guomao Building (Chinese: 国贸大厦, otherwise known as International Foreign Trade Centre) is an office tower and one of the earliest skyscrapers in Shenzhen, China. Its fast construction process was termed the "Shenzhen speed".

Located at the junction of Jiabin Road and Renmin South Road, Luohu District, the building stands 160 metres tall and consists of 50 floors. Construction started on 1 November 1982 and was completed 37 months later on 29 December 1985. This earned the city's rapid development the nickname "Shenzhen Speed". It was the tallest building in China upon completion.

The building stands on a slot of 20,000 square metres and a built-up floor area of 100,000 square metres. It consists mainly of office space (floors 5-43, except 24) but features a revolving restaurant at the 48th and 49th floor and a helipad atop the building. The first five floors are retail spaces.

== See also ==
- Shenzhen speed
- List of tallest buildings in Shenzhen
- Guomao station, the Shenzhen Metro station serving and named after the building
