= List of tallest buildings in Chongqing =

Tall buildings in Chongqing
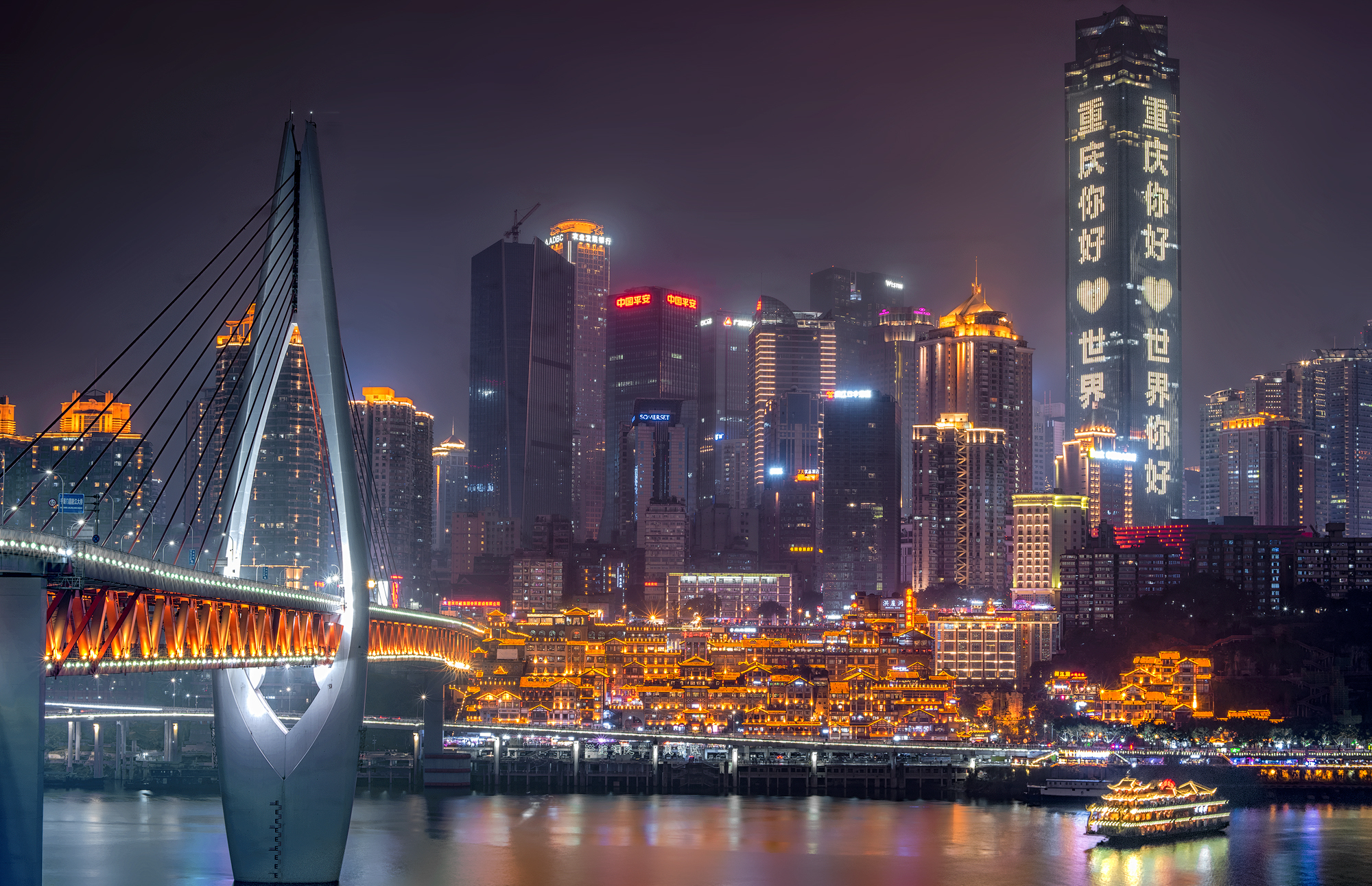
- The skyline of Jiefangbei CBD in Yuzhong District with Chongqing World Financial Center in the right
- Tallest building: Raffles City Chongqing T3N & T4N (2019)
- Tallest building height: 354.5 m (1,163 ft)
- First 150 m+ building: Chongqing Nationality Plaza B (1998)

Number of tall buildings
- Taller than 150 m (492 ft): 155 (2026) (#10)
- Taller than 200 m (656 ft): 64 (2026)
- Taller than 300 m (984 ft): 6 (2026)

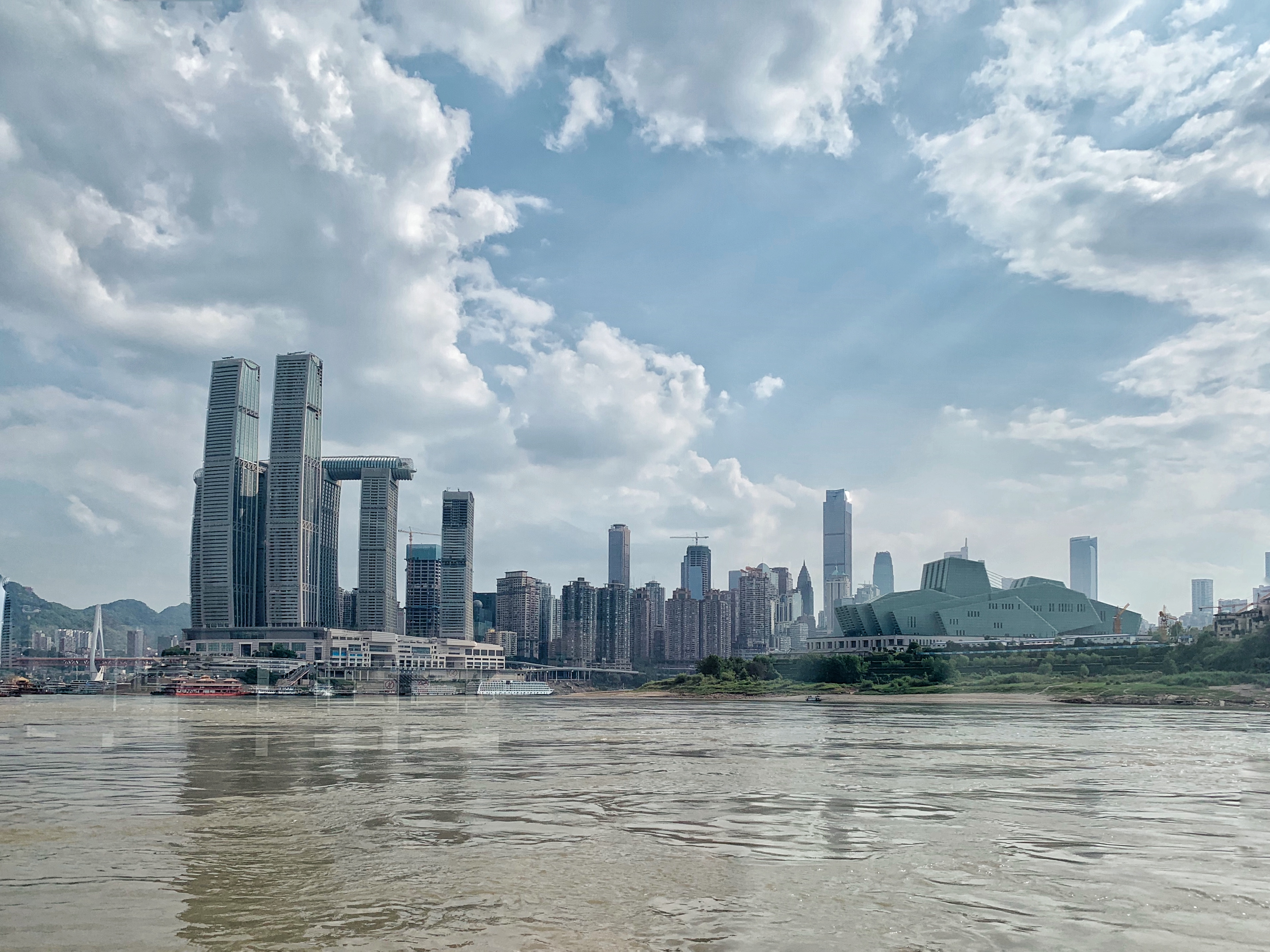
Raffles City Chongqing on the Yangtze

Chongqing is a megacity in southwestern China, with an urban population of over 22 million. One of China's four directly administered municipalities, it is considered a major political, economic, industrial, financial and cultural centre in the interior of China, along with Chengdu. Chongqing has one of the largest skylines in the world, with 149 skyscrapers taller than 150 meters (492 feet) as of 2025. 61 of its skyscrapers are taller than 200 m (656 ft), five of which are supertall skyscrapers taller than 300 m (984 ft).

The city's skyline is known for its height, hilly and narrow terrain, and the lighting of its buildings at night. It has been compared to Pittsburgh due to the arrangement of its skyscrapers, the tallest of which are located in the district of Yuzhong, effectively a peninsula located at the confluence of the Jialing and Yangtze Rivers. Tall buildings often have multiple "ground-level" access points on different floors, and many buildings are connected via raised walkways and skybridges.

The first skyscrapers in Chongqing appeared in the late 1990s, with their construction becoming more frequent during the 2000s. The rate of construction increased significantly during the 2010s; since the 2020s, it has slowed down slightly. The title of the tallest building in Chongqing is held by the International Land-Sea Center, which rises to 458.2 m (1,503 ft) and completed in 2026. It is also the tallest building in Western China.

== Tallest buildings ==
This lists ranks completed skyscrapers in Chongqing that stand at least 200 m (656 ft) tall as of July 2026, based on standard height measurement. This includes spires and architectural details but does not include antenna masts.

Was the tallest building in Chongqing upon completion

Rank	Name	Image	Height	Floors	Use	Year	Notes
1	International Land-Sea Center	Photo of Chongqing International Land-Sea Center taken on 28.10.2025 from Liziba viewing platform	458.2 m	98	Mixed-use	2026	Tallest building in Chongqing. Tallest building constructed during the 2020s.
2 =	Raffles City Chongqing T3N		354.5 m	79	Mixed-use	2019	Joint tallest buildings in Chongqing from 2019 to 2026. Joint tallest building constructed during the 2010s.
2 =	Raffles City Chongqing T4N		354.5 m	74	Mixed-use	2019	Joint-tallest buildings in Chongqing from 2019 to 2026. Joint tallest building constructed during the 2010s.
4	Chongqing World Financial Center		338.9 m	72	Mixed-use	2015	Tallest building in Chongqing from 2015 to 2019.
5	Chongqing IFS T1		316.3 m	63	Mixed-use	2016	
6	International Commerce Financial Centre T1		301.2 m	65	Mixed-use	2022	
7	Concord International Centre		290 m	64	Mixed-use	2017	
8	Yingli International Finance Centre		288 m	58	Office	2012	Tallest building in Chongqing from 2012 to 2015. Tallest office only building in Chongqing.
9	United International Mansion		287 m	67	Office	2013	
10	HNA&POLY International Centre		286.8 m	61	Mixed-use	2013	Also known as Chongqing Poly Tower
11	Chongqing World Trade Center		283.1 m	60	Office	2005	Tallest building in Chongqing from 2005 to 2012. Tallest building constructed in the 2000s.
12	Oriental Plaza T1		262 m	56	Mixed-use	2016	
13 =	Lanko Conference & Exhibition International Plaza Yage		258 m	54	Mixed-use	2010	Also known as Lanko International Conference & Exhibition Tower D
13 =	Lanko Grand Hyatt Hotel		258 m	60	Mixed-use	2005	
15	Corporate Avenue 2		255.8 m	47	Office	2014	
16 =	Raffles City Chongqing T2		255.6 m	57	Mixed-use	2019	
16 =	Raffles City Chongqing T5		255.6 m	58	Mixed-use	2019	
16 =	Raffles City Chongqing T3S		255.6 m	48	Mixed-use	2019	
16 =	Raffles City Chongqing T4S		255.6 m	51	Mixed-use	2019	
20	Guangda Holdings Chaotianmen Center		249.4 m	49	Office	2021	
21	Jia Fa Centre		247.2 m	52	Mixed-use	2015	
22	Forebase Financial Plaza		245.3 m	54	Mixed-use	2014	
23	Neo China Top City A1		242.4 m	54	Mixed-use	2009	
24	Chongqing Longfor Skyline T1		239.4 m	52	Office	2022	
25	Xinhua International Building		238.6 m	53	Mixed-use	2011	
26	ASE Center R3		236.8 m	69	Mixed-use	2016	
27	Future International		236 m	50	Mixed-use	2007	
28 =	Raffles City Chongqing T1		228.5 m	52	Mixed-use	2019	
28 =	Raffles City Chongqing T6		228.5 m	52	Mixed-use	2019	
30 =	New York New York		228 m	46	Mixed-use	2004	Tallest building in Chongqing from 2004 to 2005.
30 =	Wuyue Plaza Tower A		228 m	44	Office	2022	
32	Wyndham Centre		226 m	48	Mixed-use	2016	
33	Evergrande Royal Dragon H2		225.3 m	68	Residential	2024	Tallest fully residential building in Chongqing.
34	China Resources Building		223.7 m	44	Mixed-use	2016	
35	Evergrande Liberation Monument Centre Tower 1		223.1 m	53	Mixed-use	2018	
36	Kempinski Hotel Chongqing		220.5 m	54	Mixed-use	2012	
37	Pauline's World City T1		220 m	41	Mixed-use	2018	
38	Ying Li International Plaza T1		218.9 m	52	Mixed-use	2015	
39 =	Sheraton International Business Center 1		218 m	42	Hotel	2010	
39 =	Sheraton International Business Center 2		218 m	42	Hotel	2010	
39 =	Chongqing Rural Commercial Bank Financial Building		218 m	42	Office	2016	
42	Fosun International Center		213.3 m	44	Mixed-use	2022	
43 =	Jahoo Hong Kong City		211 m	56	Mixed-use	2008	
43 =	Evergrande Royal Dragon T5		211 m	66	Residential	2018	
45 =	Fortune Financial Centre		210 m	45	Office	2017	
45 =	Crowne Plaza Tower 2		210 m	50	Hotel	2014	
45 =	Crowne Plaza Tower 1		210 m	50	Hotel	2014	
48 =	Zesheng Twin Tower A		207.7 m	48	Mixed-use	2011	
48 =	Zesheng Twin Tower B		207.7 m	48	Mixed-use	2011	
50 =	Paradise by the River A		207 m	54	Mixed-use	2005	
50 =	Paradise by the River B		207 m	54	Mixed-use	2005	
50 =	Paradise by the River C		207 m	54	Mixed-use	2007	
53	Chongqing Plaza T1		206.5 m	40	Mixed-use	2015	
54	Glory International Center		203.8 m	45	Mixed-use	2014	
55	ASE Center R2		202.8 m	58	Mixed-use	2013	
56	Yuelai Convention and Exhibition Headquarters Base		201.9 m	43	Office	2023	
57	Chongqing Gaoke Taiyangzuo		201.5 m	39	Office	2022	
58 =	Shapingba Railway Station East Tower		200 m	40	SOHO	2020	
58 =	Shapingba Railway Station West Tower		200 m	40	SOHO	2020	
58 =	Chongqing Fortune Center		200 m	45	Office	2016	
58 =	China Huarong Modern Plaza		200 m	Unknown	Office	2017	
58 =	Science Financial Center Tower 1		200 m	40	Office	2017	

== Tallest under construction or proposed ==
=== Under construction ===
This lists ranks skyscrapers under construction in Chongqing that are expected to be at least 200 m (656 ft) tall as of 2025, based on standard height measurement. The “Year” column indicates the expected year of completion. Buildings that are on hold are not included.

Name	Height	Floors	Use	Year	Notes
International Land-Sea Center	458.2 m	98	Mixed-use	2025	
Jiefangbei Book City	300 m	63	Mixed-use	2025	
Loncin Centre T1	278 m	56	Mixed-use	2025	

=== Proposed ===
This lists ranks proposed skyscrapers in Chongqing that are planned to be at least 200 m (656 ft) tall as of 2025, based on standard height measurement.

Name	Height	Floors	Use	Year	Notes
SUNAC A-ONE Tower 1	470 m	101	Mixed-use	2030	
Chongqing Centre T1	388 m	TBD	Mixed-use	TBD	
Chongqing Centre T4	291 m	TBD	Mixed-use	TBD	
ASE Center R5	290.9 m	62	Mixed-use	TBD	
SUNAC A-ONE Tower 3	251 m	61	Office	2029	
Corporate Avenue 10	250 m	TBD	Mixed-use	TBD	
Evergrande Liberation Monument Centre Tower 2	213.4 m	46	Mixed-use	TBD	
Robinson Place T1	213.3 m	58	Mixed-use	TBD	
Corporate Avenue 9	200 m	TBD	Mixed-use	TBD	

== Timeline of tallest buildings ==
Name	Image	Years as tallest	Height (m)	Floors
Chongqing Nationality Plaza B		1998–2000	176	43
Daxin Building		2000–2004	195	45
New York New York		2004–2005	228	46
Chongqing World Trade Center		2005–2012	283.	60
Yingli International Finance Centre		2012–2015	288	58
Chongqing World Financial Center		2015–2019	338.9	72
Raffles City Chongqing T3N & T4N		2019–	354.5	74, 79

== Gallery ==
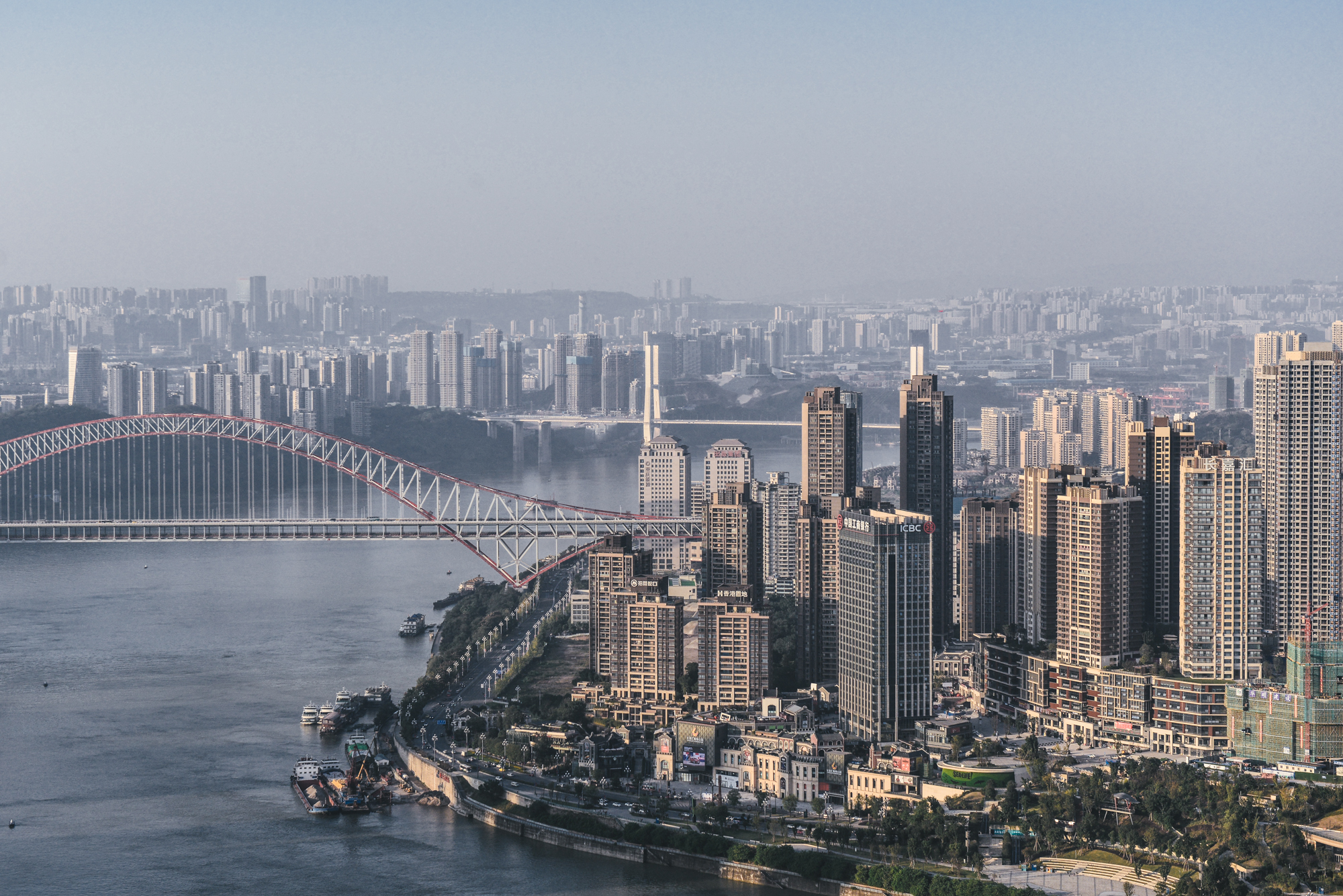
View of Chaotianmen Bridge in Nan'an

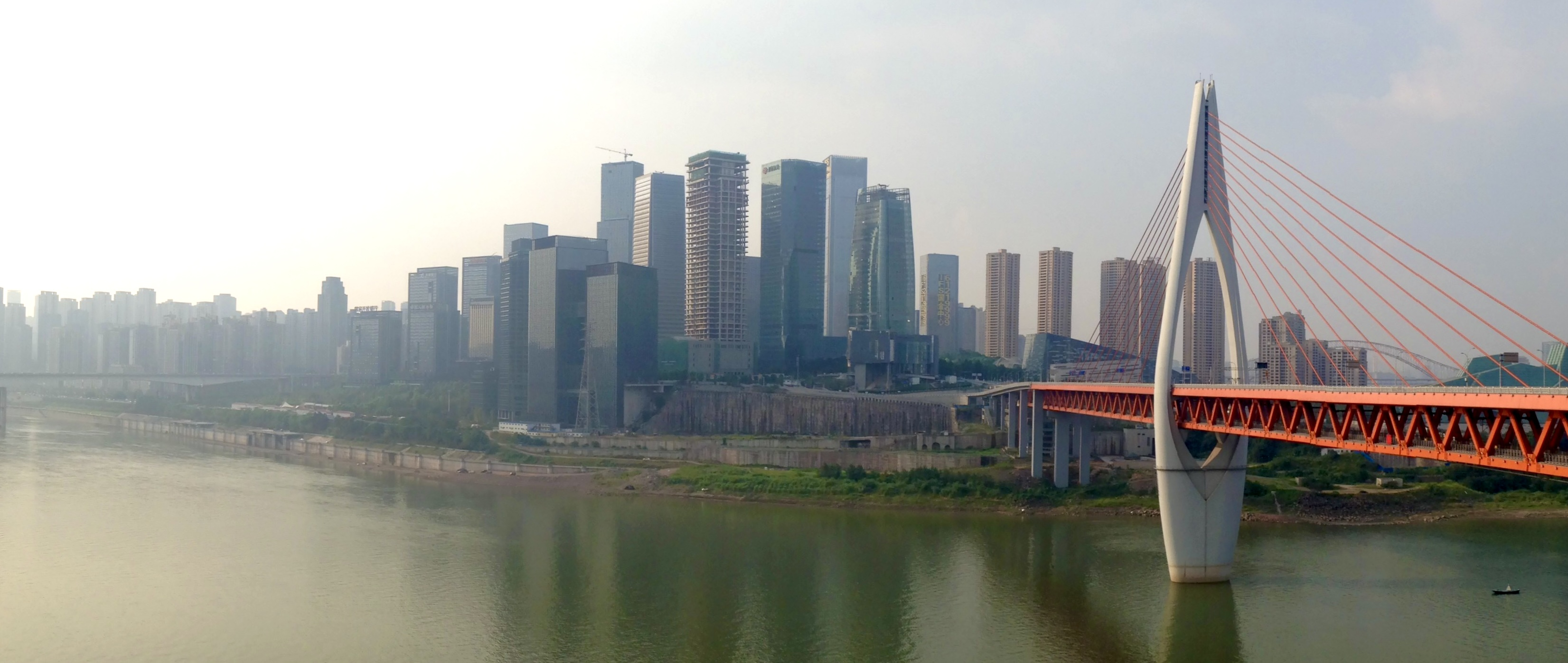
Skyline with the Twin Rivers Bridges

== See also ==
- Diagram of Chongqing skyscrapers on SkyscraperPage
- Skyscrapers of Chongqing on Gaoloumi (in Chinese)
- The World's best Skyline
- Chongqing World Financial Center
- Chongqing World Trade Center
- Raffles City Chongqing
- Chongqing IFS T1
- Chongqing Tall Tower
