= Jiefangbei CBD =

Business district of Chongqing, China

Coordinates: 29.560454°N 106.5734°E

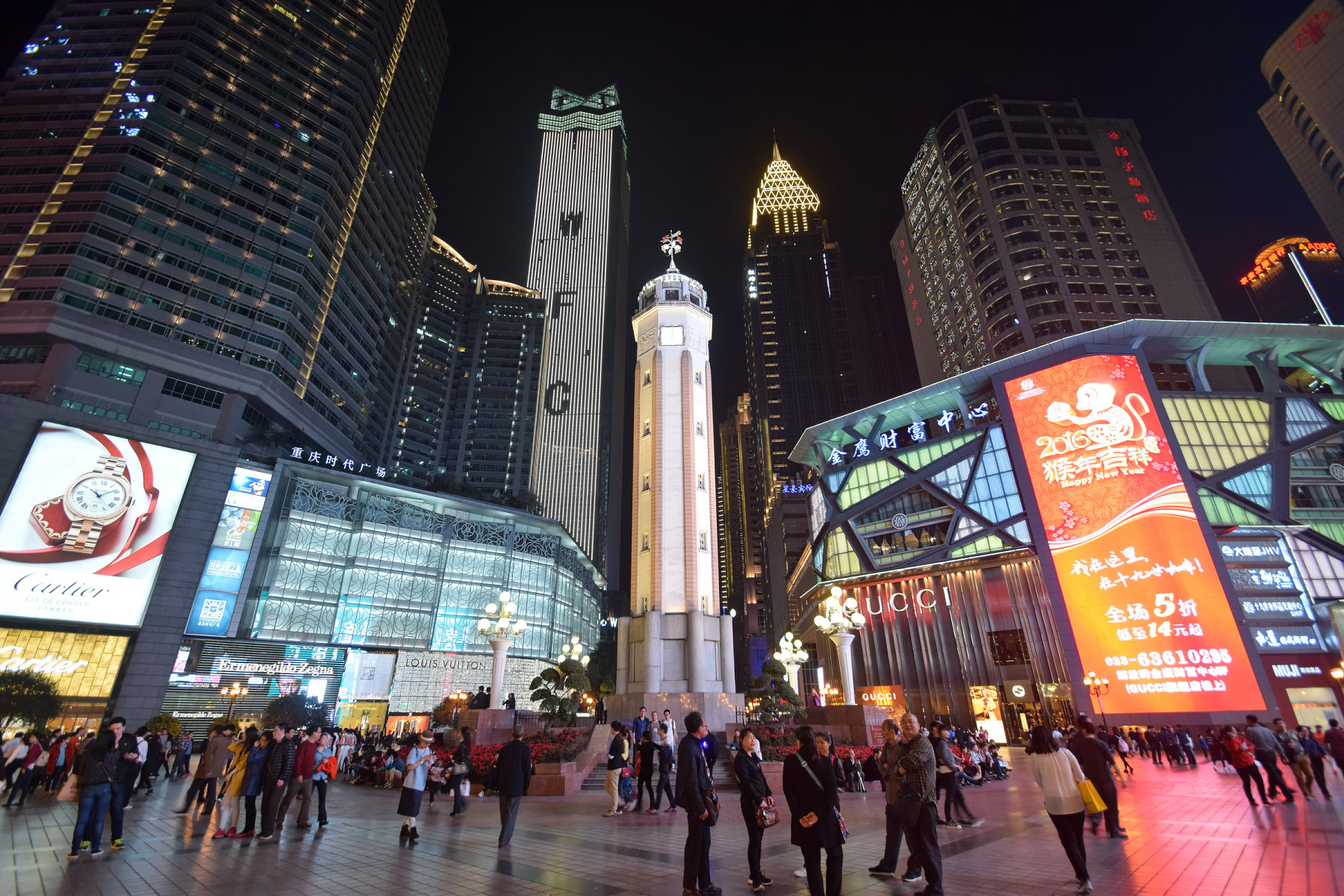
Night view of Jiefangbei

Jiefangbei Central Business District (CBD) (simplified Chinese: 解放碑中央商务区; traditional Chinese: 解放碑中央商務區; pinyin: Jiěfàngbēi Zhōngyāng Shāngwù Qū), also known as Jiefangbei Business Walking Street (Chinese: 解放碑商业步行街; pinyin: Jiěfàngbēi Shāngyè Bùxíngjiē), is the ultra-dense, urbanized downtown core and one of several central business districts of Chongqing, China. It is anchored by a large pedestrian mall with a landmark monument tower (its namesake, "Jiefangbei") and surrounded by collections of tall skyscrapers.

== Overview ==
The area surrounding the Jiefangbei monument tower makes up the main central business district of the Yuzhong District of Chongqing and is one of the most prominent CBDs in the interior Western China. Thousands of shops, bars, and restaurants are located in Jiefangbei CBD including numerous large international department stores, upscale designer boutiques, local street food stalls, movie theaters, bars, and dance clubs; all clustered in pedestrian only streets surrounding the Jiefangbei monument and pedestrian square.

The Jiefangbei pedestrian square itself is lined with numerous giant mega-shopping malls with jumbotron LED screens and illuminated advertising billboards located alongside the city's tallest commercial skyscrapers, world class international hotels, and luxurious residential accommodations. According to Women's Wear Daily, in 2013, Jiefangbei Square was popular with "young, stylish people to meet and shop at stores like Cartier, Ermenegildo Zegna, Louis Vuitton, Gucci and Rolex." Chongqing Haochi Jie, which is a popular food street is not far away from Jiefangbei and is a popular destination among locals and tourists.

== History ==
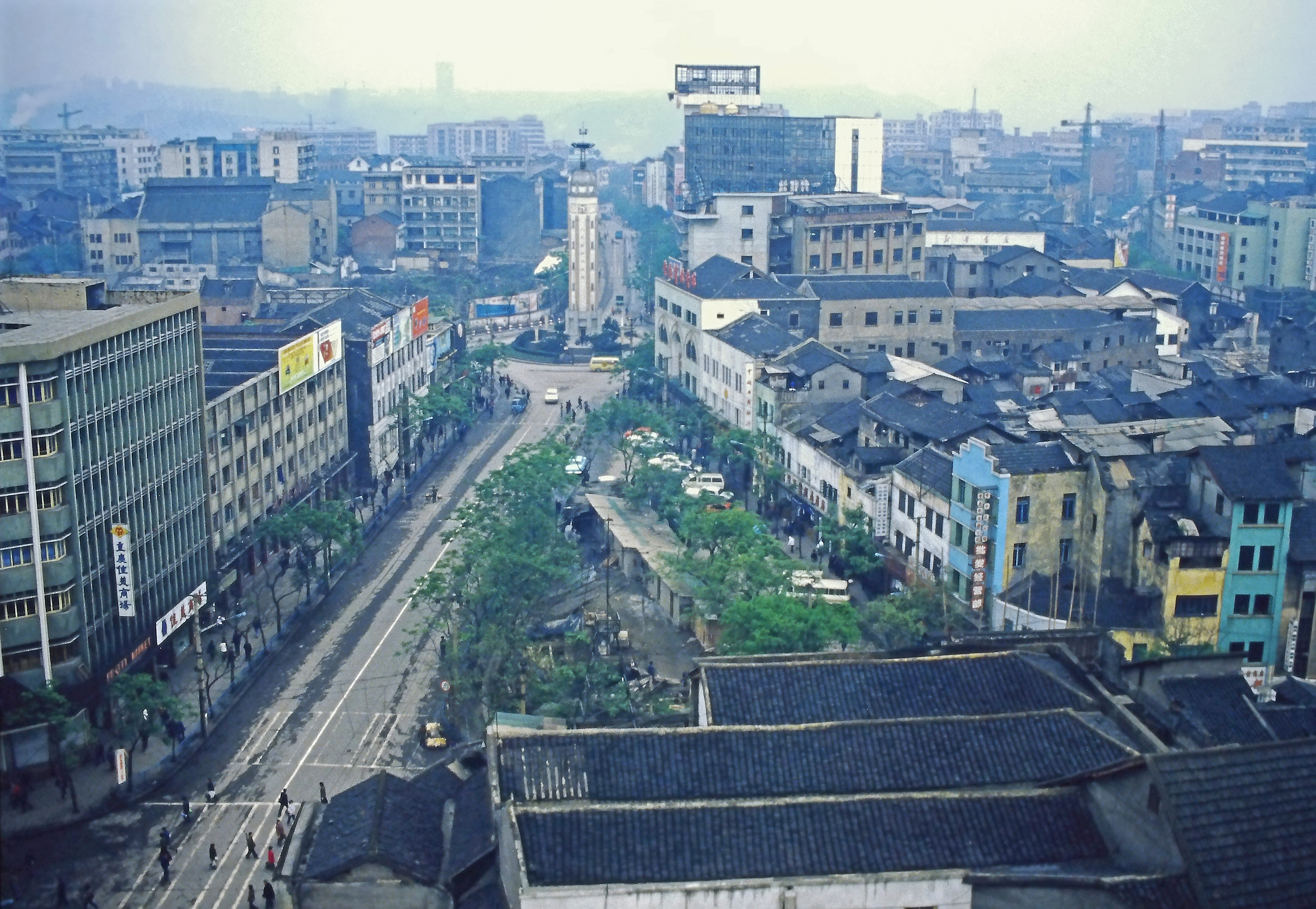
Jiefangbei square in 1987.

Jiefangbei Shopping Square was completed in 1997.

== Geography ==
Jiefangbei consists of a large pedestrian square surrounding the 27.5-meter (90 ft)-tall People's Liberation Monument (celebrating China's victory in World War II). The 25,000-square-meter (270,000 sq ft) shopping square is flanked by a large number of large multinational department stores, streetfront luxury boutiques, and upscale restaurants, as well as commercial supertall skyscrapers. There are podiums offering additional retail options both streetside and underground.

Jiefangbei is the heart of Chongqing city. It is located immediately uphill from the Chaotianmen Port, which is at the confluence of the Jialing and Yangtze Rivers.

== Attractions ==
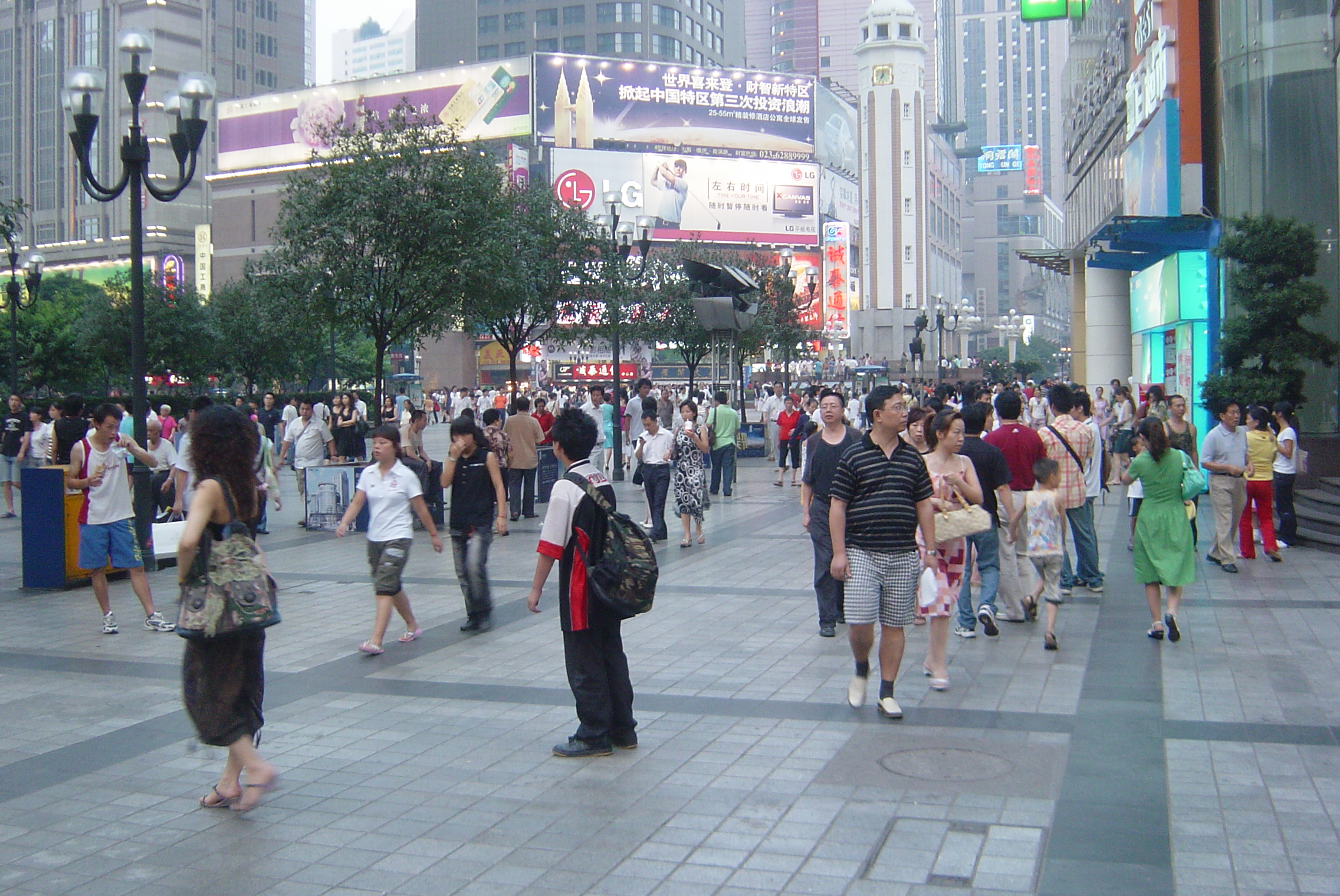
The pedestrian mall in downtown Jiefangbei.

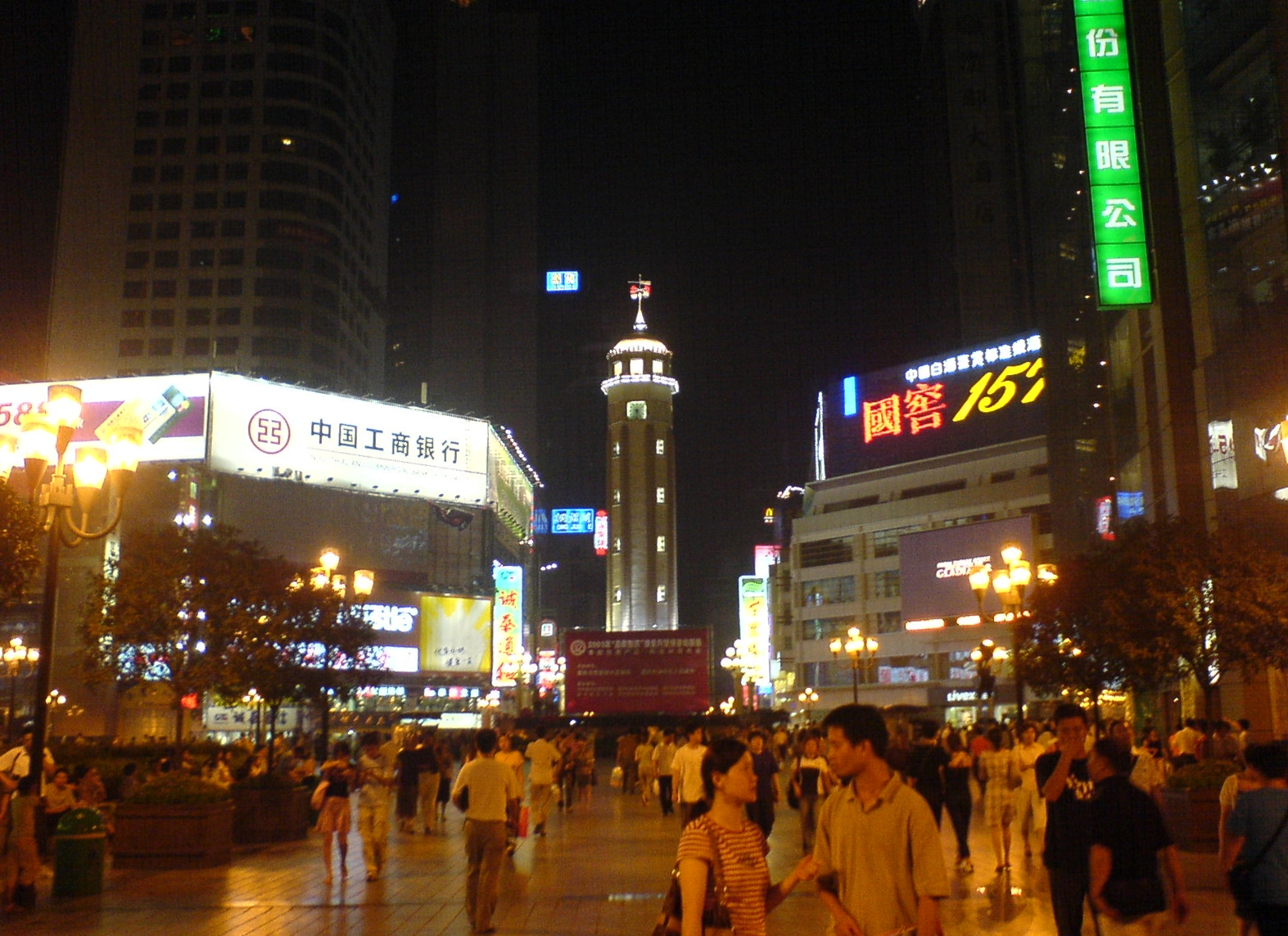
A look of Jiefangbei in 2005

- Changjiang (Yangtze River) Ropeway
- Chaotianmen Square
  - Chaotianmen Passenger Ferry night light show
- HongYaDong (洪崖洞) Shopping Complex
- Jiefangbei (People's Liberation, WWII) Monument and Clock
- Jiefangbei Food Street
- People's Park

=== Department stores ===
- Pacific Department Store (太平洋)
- Wangfujing Department Store (王府井百货)
- Carrefour (家乐福)
- Maison Mode Times (美美百货)
- Diwang Square (地王广场)
- Chongqing Times Square (时代广场)

=== Towers ===
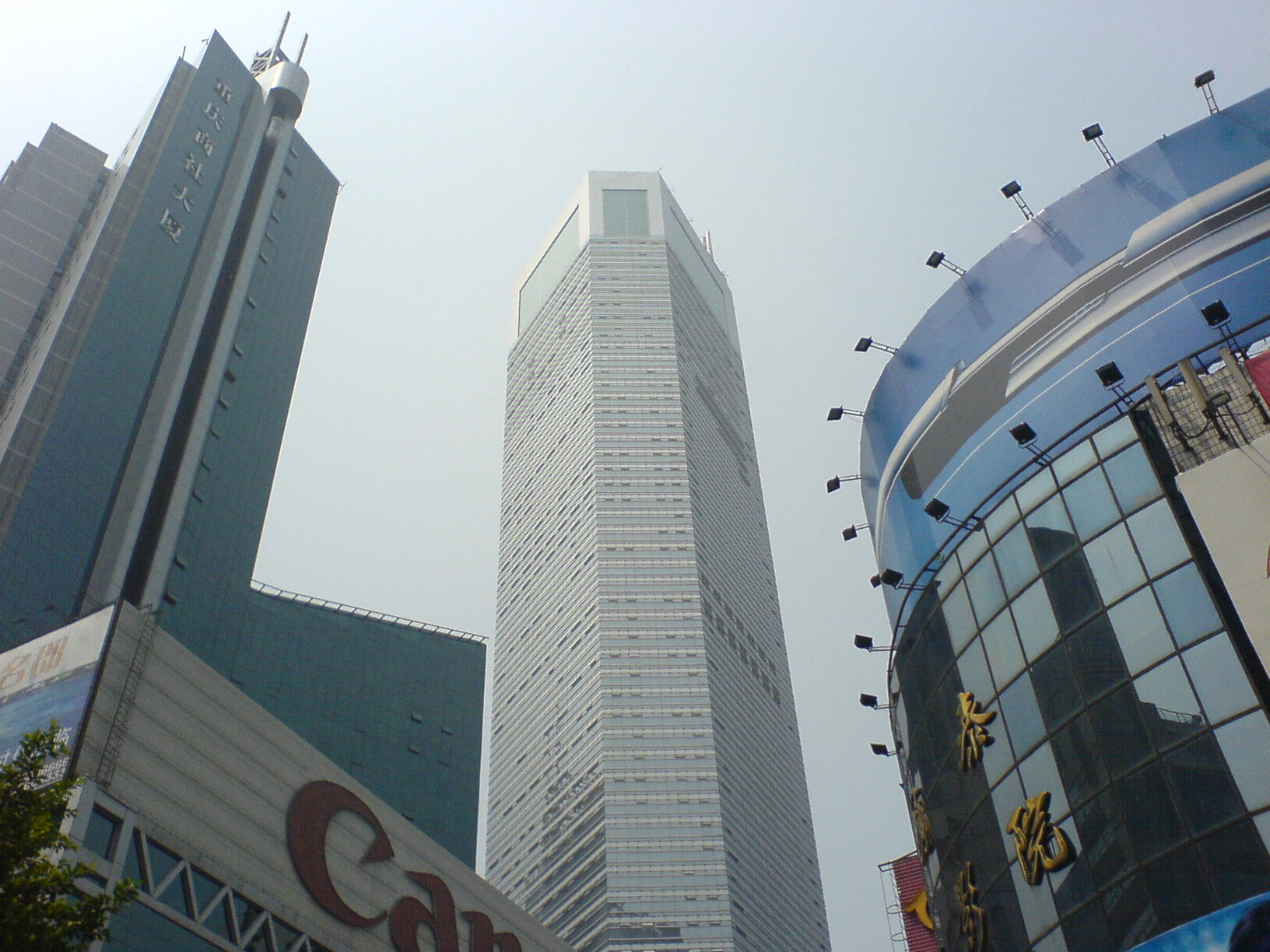
Chongqing World Trade Center, exterior view.

- Chongqing Financial Street
- Chongqing International Trade Center (ITC: A, B) (国际贸易中心A座/聚富城1座, 国际贸易中心B座/豪生酒店/聚富城2座)
- Chongqing Poly Tower (重庆保利大厦)
- Chongqing Tall Tower (International Finance Center)
- Chongqing World Financial Center (WFCC) (重庆世界金融中心)
- Chongqing World Trade Center (WTCC) (世界贸易中心)
- Intercontinental Hotel Chongqing
- International Commercial Center (ICC) (国际商务中心)
- Metropolitan Tower (大都会广场)
- New York New York (纽约·纽约/重庆名优土特产品贸易中心)
- United International Mansion (联合国际大厦)
- Westin Hotel
- Xinhua International Tower (智能大厦)
- Yingli Tower (英利大厦)

== Public transit ==
Being the prominent CBD for the city, Jiefangbei is well served by public transportation. Chongqing Rail Transit (CRT) has three metro subway lines crossing the CBD and there are numerous municipal bus routes to other parts of the city. Taxis and shuttle buses are readily available to hail streetside or at hotel taxi stands throughout the central business district.

=== Subway information ===
- CRT Line 1
  - Jiaochangkou Station (较场口)
  - Xiaoshizi Station (小什字)
  - Chaotianmen Station (朝天门) (terminus)
- CRT Line 2
  - Linjiangmen Station (临江门)
  - Jiaochangkou Station (较场口) (terminus)
- CRT Line 6
  - Xiaoshizi Station (小什字)

== See also ==
- Jiangbeizui CBD
- List of leading shopping streets and districts by city
