= Liberation Monument =

Liberation Monument or Liberation Memorial may refer to:

- Liberation Monument (Pyongyang), North Korea
- Liberation Monument in Chongqing
- Liberation (Holocaust memorial), United States
- 1982 Liberation Memorial, Falkland Islands
- Monument to the Peaceful Liberation of Tibet
- Gay Liberation Monument
- Prussian National Monument for the Liberation Wars
- West Irian Liberation Monument
- National Canadian Liberation Monument
- African Liberation Monument
- Liberation Monument (Chișinău)

== See also ==
- Media related to World War II memorials commemorating liberation at Wikimedia Commons
