= Yingli Tower =

Coordinates: 29.55554°N 106.574893°E

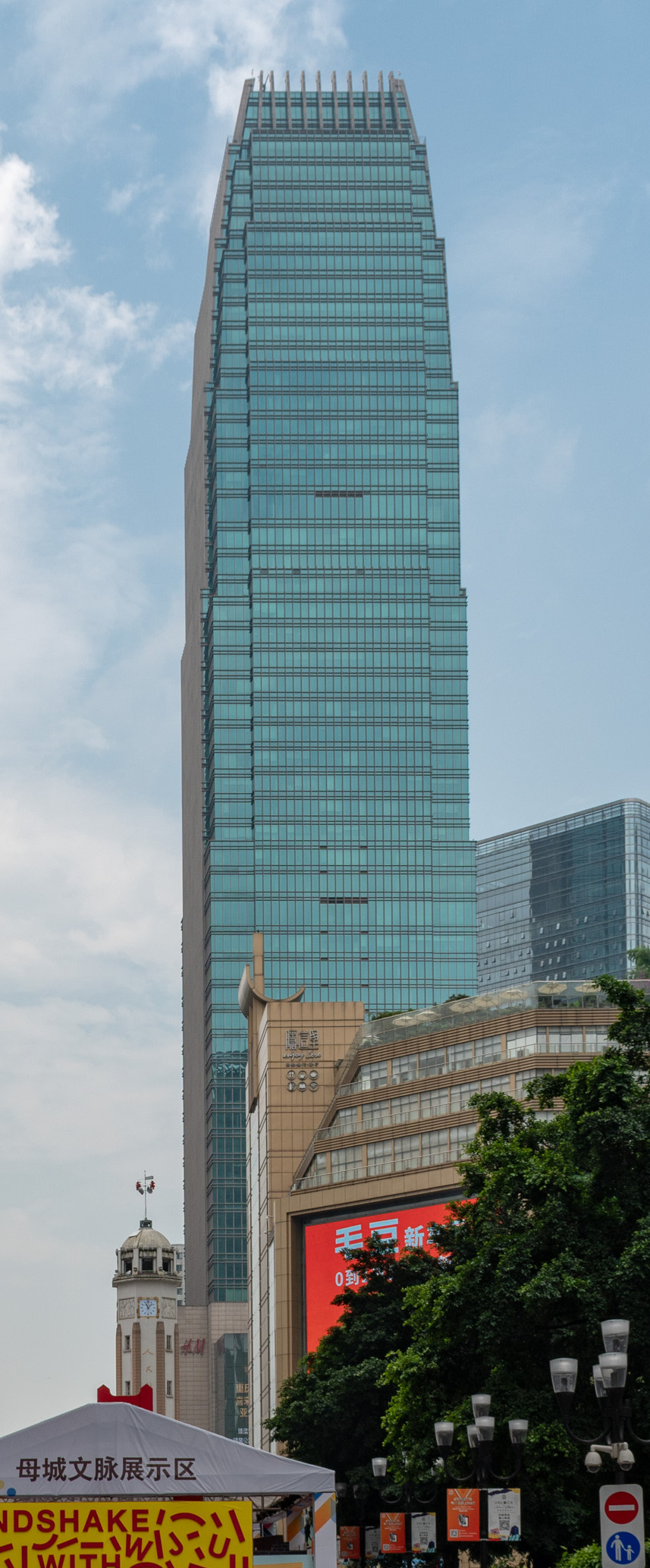
- Interactive map of the Yingli Tower area

General information
- Status: Completed
- Type: Office
- Location: Chongqing, China
- Construction started: 2009
- Estimated completion: 2012

Height
- Roof: 285 metres (935 ft)

Technical details
- Floor count: 65
- Floor area: 1,867,538 sq ft (173,500.0 m^{2})

Design and construction
- Developer: Chongqing Yingli Real Estate Development

Yingli Tower, also known as Ying Li International Financial Centre is a skyscraper in the Jiefangbei CBD area of Chongqing, China. Its construction started in 2009 and was completed in 2012. It is an office building with a retail podium. In 2012 Yingli Tower eclipsed the Chongqing World Trade Center to become the tallest building in Western China, although this title was short lived since Chongqing Poly Tower received the title later in the year.

== Architecture ==
Like traditional American skyscraper design, articulated setbacks are used to separate and taper the vertical shaft of the main body as it rises, similar to the Empire State Building. The tower bears some resemblance to IFC 2 in Hong Kong. Subtle features characteristic in Art Deco design are embedded within the corners of the base and the central main shaft of the tower. Each of the outer corner setbacks are curved outwards. A similar method was reused to form the crown of the building but the design curves inwards instead to form a single pinnacle consisting of a series of tessellated diamonds. This curvature was also applied on the roof design of the retail podium which also curves inwards towards the tower.

Preceded by World Trade Center	Tallest Building in Chongqing; 2012—2012; 285m	Succeeded by Chongqing Poly Tower
