= Concord International Centre =

Skyscraper in Chongqing, China

- 天和国际中心
- Interactive map of the Concord International Centre area

General information
- Status: Completed
- Type: Mixed use
- Location: Jiangbei, Chongqing, China
- Coordinates: 29.5767898°N 106.5306203°E
- Construction started: 2012
- Completed: 2017

Height
- Architectural: 290 m (950 ft)
- Tip: 290 m (950 ft)

Technical details
- Floor count: 64

Design and construction
- Architecture firm: Gensler

Concord International Centre is a 290 metres (950 feet) tall skyscraper completed in Chongqing, China. Its construction was started in 2012 and completed in 2017. The building was developed by Chongqing Yongde Real Estate and designed by Gensler.

== See also ==
- List of tallest buildings in Chongqing
