= NEO-China Top City Main Tower =

Skyscraper in Chongqing, China

The NEO-China Top City Main Tower is a 795 ft (242 m) tall skyscraper in the Jiulongpo District within the city of Chongqing, China.

The tower has 54 floors and is the 165th tallest building in the world. It was started in 2005 and completed in 2009.

== See also ==
- List of skyscrapers
- List of tallest buildings in Chongqing
