= Chongqing World Financial Center =

Supertall skyscraper in Chongqing, China

Coordinates: 29.5608°N 106.5709°E

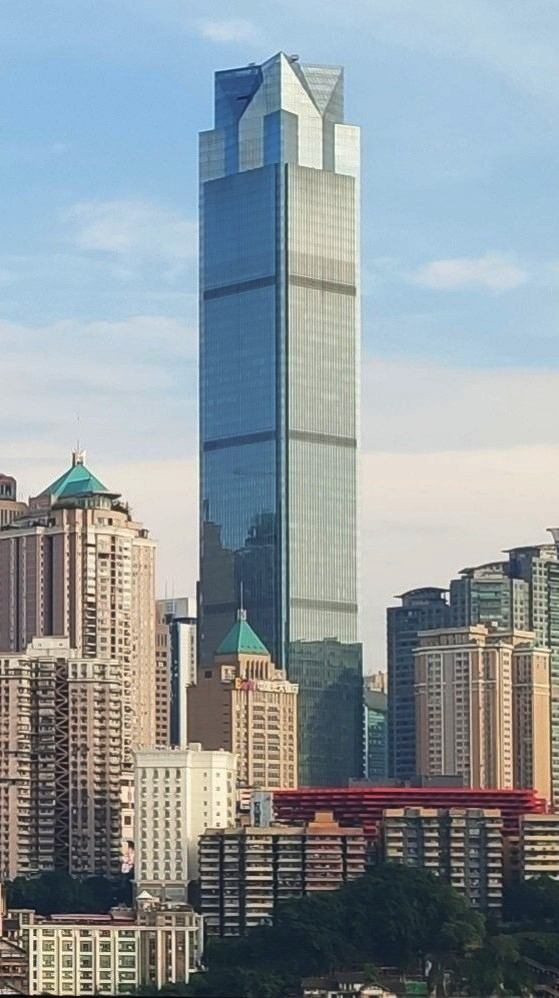
- View of the Chongqing World Financial Center in July 2019
- Interactive map of the Chongqing World Financial Center area

General information
- Status: Completed
- Type: Office
- Location: Chongqing; China
- Construction started: August 16, 2010
- Completed: September 27, 2014
- Opening: May 6, 2015
- Owner: Chongqing Worthy Land Co., Ltd.

Height
- Antenna spire: 338.9 metres (1,112 ft)
- Top floor: 306,1 metres (1,004 ft)

Technical details
- Floor count: 72
- Floor area: 2,200,143 ft^{2} (204,400 m^{2})
- Lifts/elevators: 43

Design and construction
- Architect: C.Y. Lee.
- Developer: Huaxun Real Estate Development Co. Ltd.
- Structural engineer: Arup Group; Chongqing Architecture and Design Institute
- Main contractor: China State Construction Fourth Engineering Division Corporation Ltd.

The Chongqing World Financial Center, also known as Global Financial Building (Chinese: 环球金融中心; Chinese: 環球金融中心) is a late-modernist supertall skyscraper in Chongqing, China. The 339-meter (1,112 ft)-tall office tower contains 72 floors. The skyscraper was first proposed in 2007 and broke ground in 2010. Construction of the glass and steel-building was completed in 2014. Upon completion, it was the tallest building in Chongqing, and has been surpassed by the Chongqing International Trade and Commerce Center in 2017.

== See also ==
- List of tallest buildings in Chongqing
- List of tallest buildings in China
