= Raffles City Chongqing =

Skyscraper complex in Chongqing, China

Coordinates: 29.568180°N 106.583766°E

- 重庆来福士广场
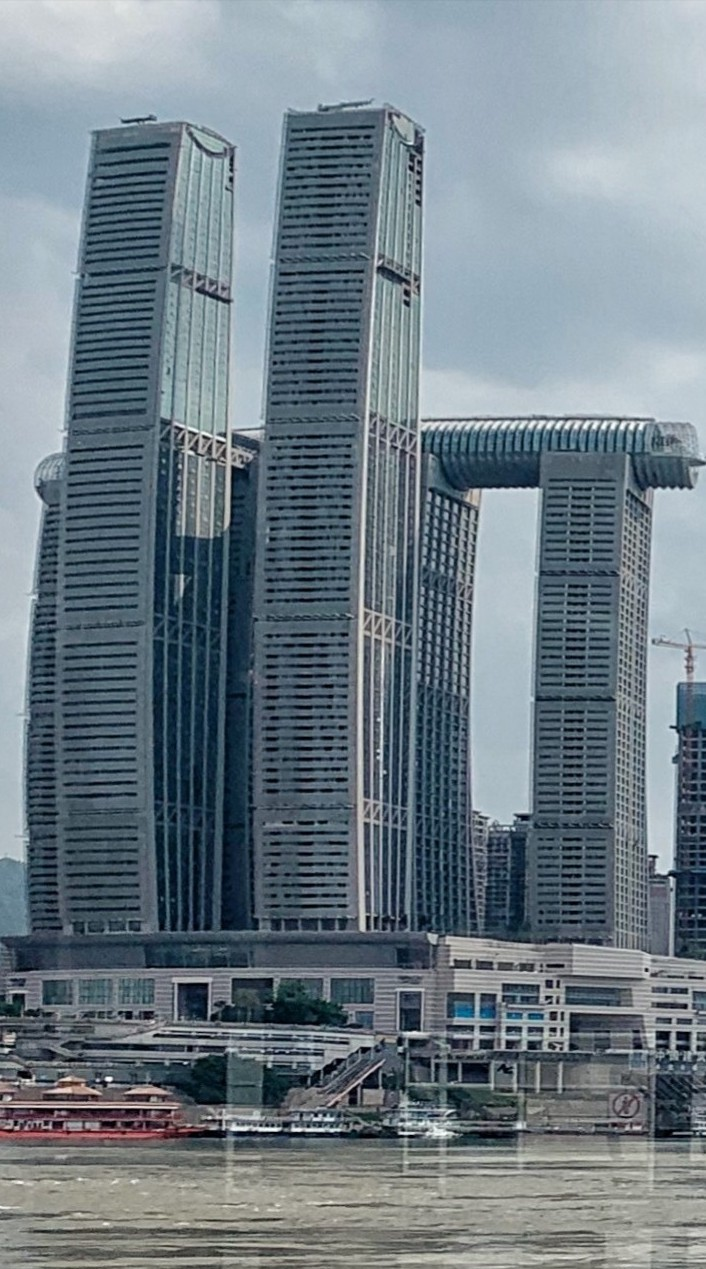
- Raffles City Chongqing in September 2019

General information
- Status: Opened
- Architectural style: High-tech architecture
- Location: China, No.18, Xinyi Street, Yuzhong District, Chongqing, China
- Construction started: 2013 approx.
- Topped-out: January 2019
- Completed: August 2019
- Opened: 6 September 2019

Height
- Height: 354.5 m (1,163 ft)

Technical details
- Material: Reinforced concrete and steel
- Floor count: 67
- Floor area: 1,200,000 square feet (110,000 m^{2})

Design and construction
- Architect: Moshe Safdie
- Developer: CapitaLand

Raffles City Chongqing
- Simplified Chinese: 重庆来福士广场
- Traditional Chinese: 重慶來福士廣場
Transcriptions
Standard Mandarin
- Hanyu Pinyin: Chóngqìng Láifúshì Guǎngchǎng

Raffles City Chongqing is a complex of eight buildings in Yuzhong District, Chongqing, China, developed by Singaporean real estate developer CapitaLand and constructed by China Construction Third Engineering Bureau Group Co. Ltd.

Raffles City Chongqing features a 300-metre-long horizontal skybridge called the "Crystal" that connects the top of four of the skycrapers. The skybridge is the second highest in the world after the Kingdom Centre in Riyadh, Saudi Arabia. The entire project comprises eight towers with a total of 817,000 square metres of floor space. It was designed by Israeli-Canadian architect Moshe Safdie. It is one of the most expensive buildings built in China. It replaced the 32-story passenger terminal building and hotel built in 1996 and the Three Gorges Hotel that was demolished on August 30, 2012.

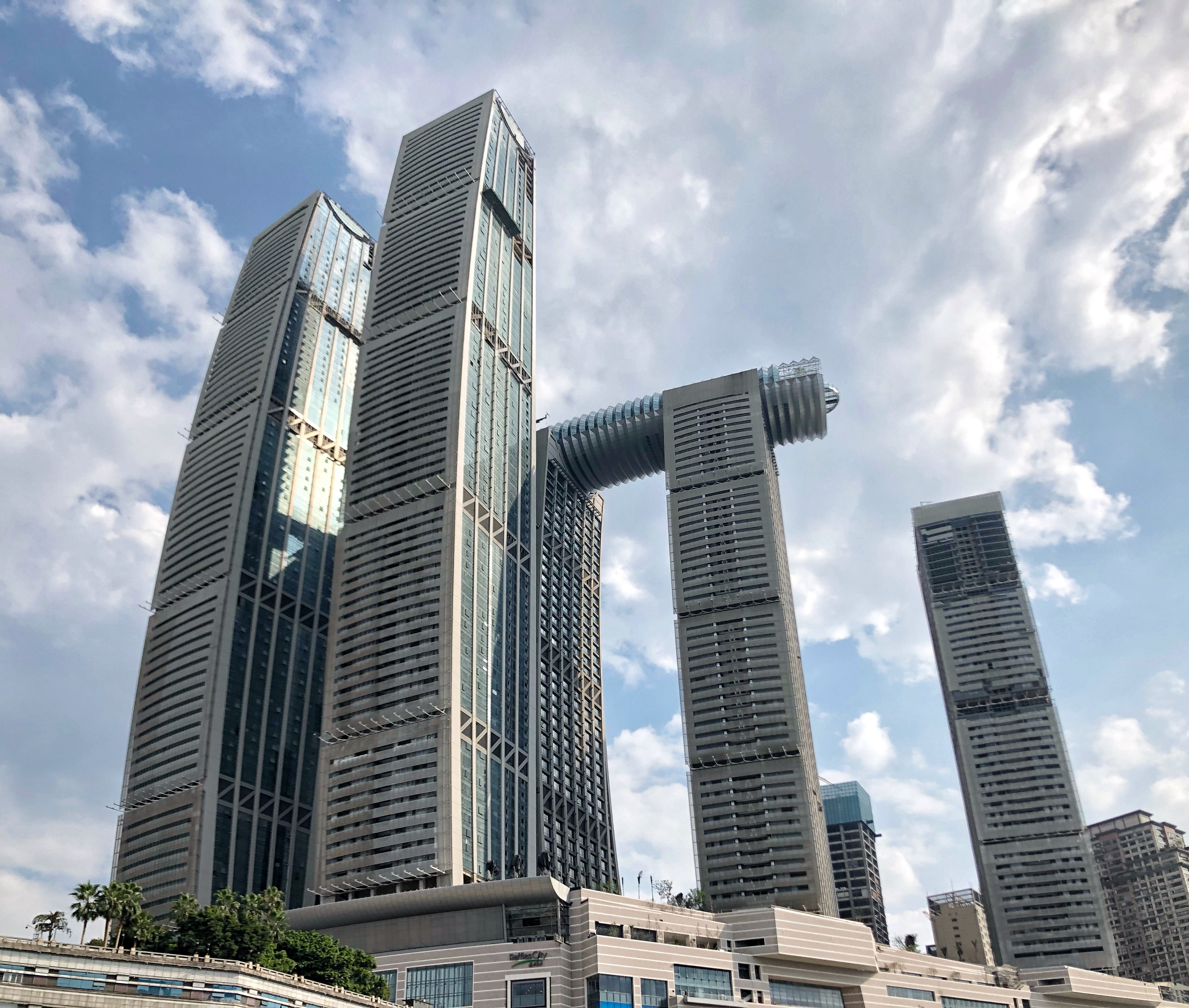
Raffles City Chongqing exterior in 2019

== Timeline ==
Construction began around 2013. As of February 2019, the structures had been completed and the interior was being finished.

== Overview ==
Raffles City Chongqing consists of eight skyscrapers situated on a site covering 9.2 hectares, in Yuzhong District, at the tip of the peninsula where the Yangtze and Jialing Rivers meet.

Atop four of the 250-metre-tall towers is an enclosed skyway, called the Crystal. Two 350-metre-tall towers connect to them, each via a cantilever bridge. Two other 250-metre-tall towers are adjacent to these six.

The project contains 1.12 million square metres of space, 817,000 square metres of which is floor space and includes 150,000m^{2} of office space and 1,400 residences, a hotel, a 235,000m^{2} shopping mall, and landscaped grounds.

The buildings are reinforced concrete with concrete-encased steel columns and steel floor spanning. The height to tip is 354.5 metres with 79 above-ground floors and 3 below.

== The Crystal ==
The Crystal is an enclosed 300-metre-long horizontal skyway that sits atop four of the buildings. The exterior consists of approximately 3,000 glass panels and nearly 5,000 aluminum panels. The Crystal set a record as the highest skybridge in the world linking the most number of towers. It includes an observation deck, park, restaurants, and a private clubhouse.

== Design and recognition ==
The project was designed by architect Moshe Safdie, who also designed Singapore's similar-looking Marina Bay Sands. It was inspired by Chinese sailing vessels and is a tribute to Chongqing's historical past as a trading centre.

Raffles City Chongqing won the China Tall Building Innovation Award.

== See also ==
- List of tallest buildings in Chongqing
