= Chongqing IFS T1 =

Supertall skyscraper in Chongqing, China

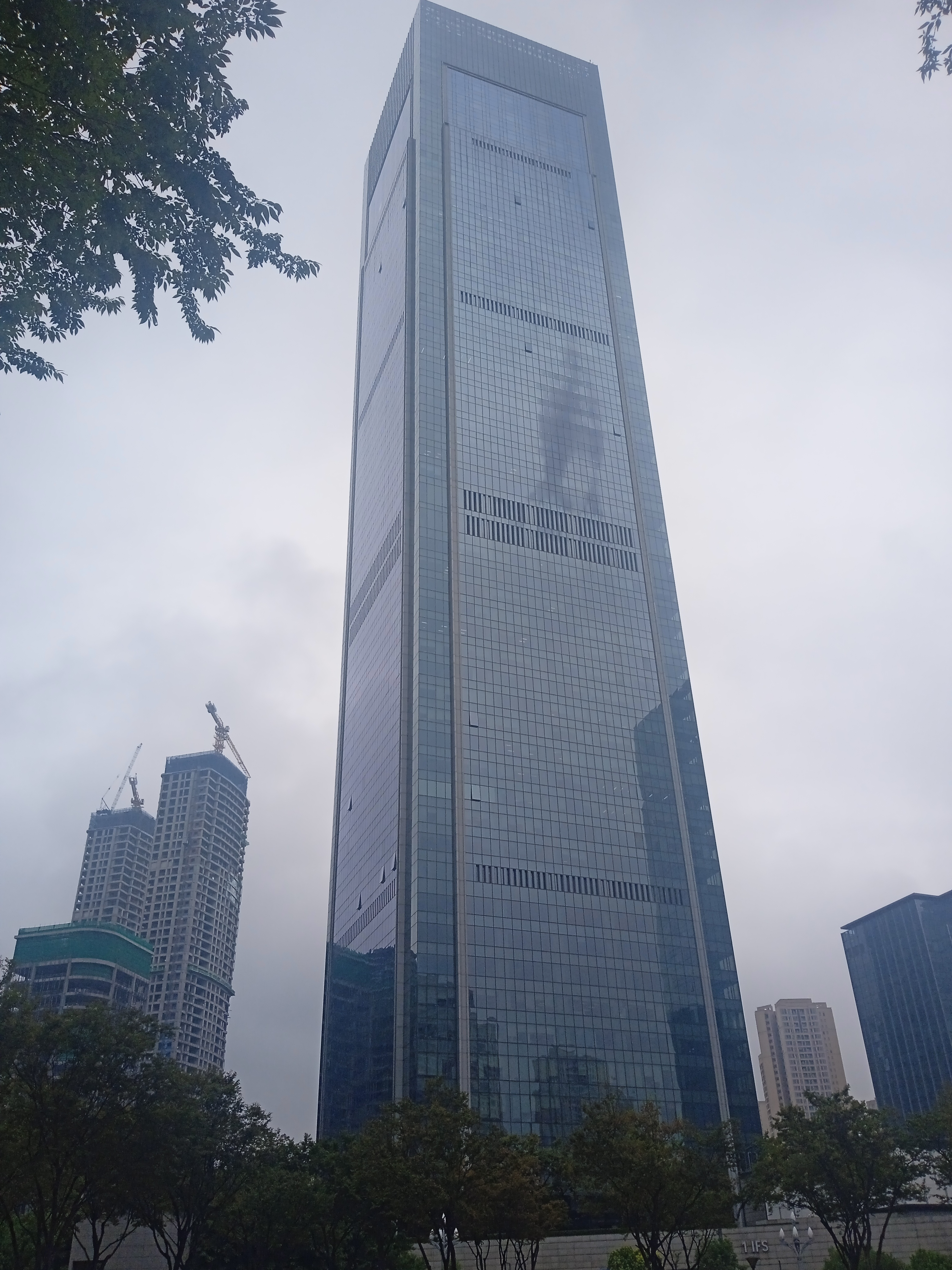
- Its T1
- Interactive map of the Chongqing IFS T1 area

General information
- Status: Completed
- Type: Mixed use
- Location: Jiangbei, Chongqing, China
- Coordinates: 29°34′33″N 106°34′04″E
- Construction started: 2012
- Completed: 2016
- Opened: 2017

Height
- Architectural: 316 metres (1,036.7 ft)
- Tip: 316 metres (1,036.7 ft)

Technical details
- Floor count: 70

Other information
- Public transit: Jiangbeicheng station

Chongqing IFS T1 is a supertall skyscraper in Chongqing, China. It is 316 metres (1,036.7 ft) tall. Construction started in 2012 and was completed in 2016. Upon its completion, the tower became the tallest building in Jiangbeizui CBD. It was officially opened on September 15, 2017.

Nicolo Hotel occupies floors 52—62, which was opened on September 8, 2017. The hotel rooms were designed by HBA.

== See also ==
- List of tallest buildings in Chongqing
