= Chongqing World Trade Center =

Skyscraper in Chongqing, China

Coordinates: 29°33′39″N 106°34′15.2″E

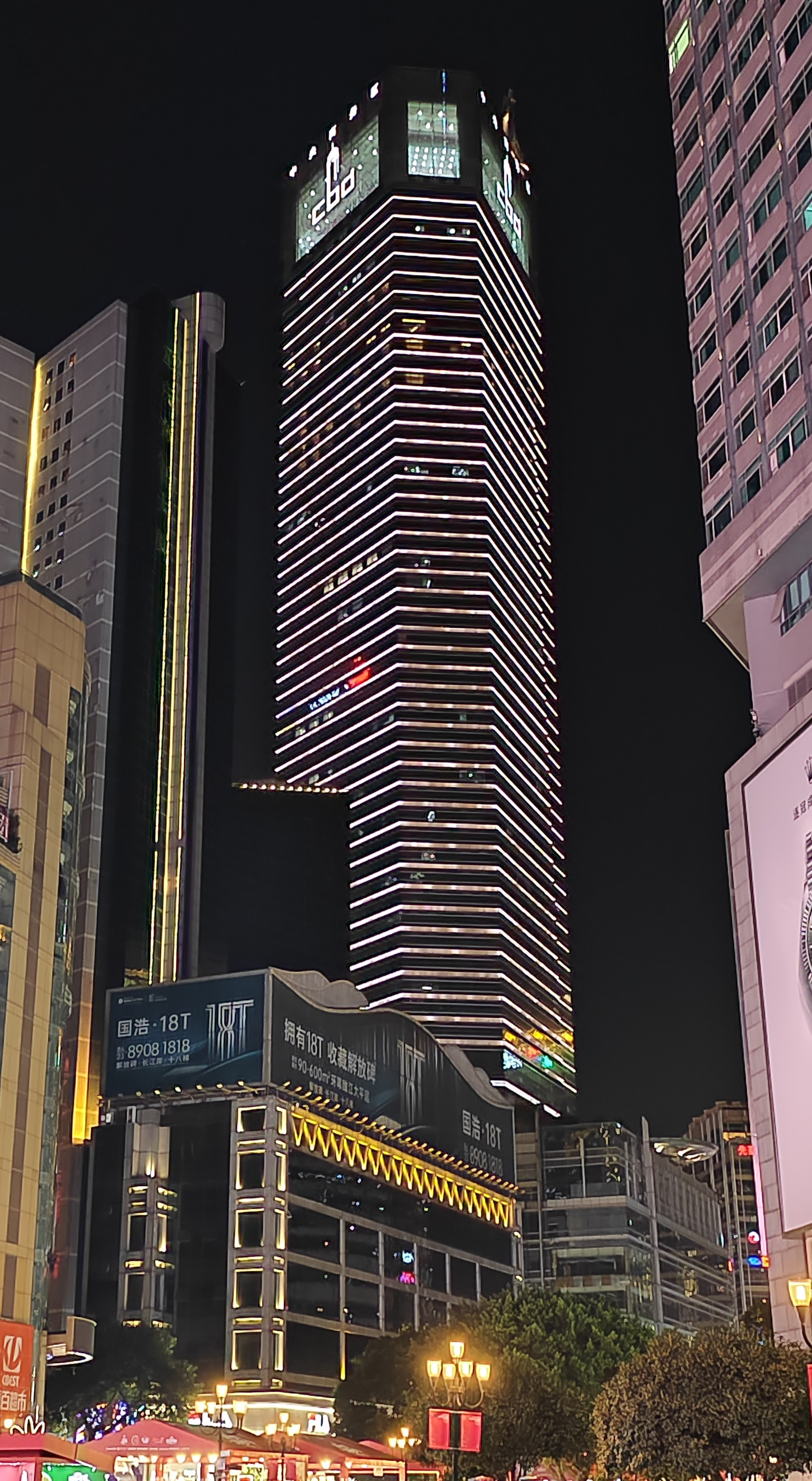
Chongqing World Trade Center at night in October 2025

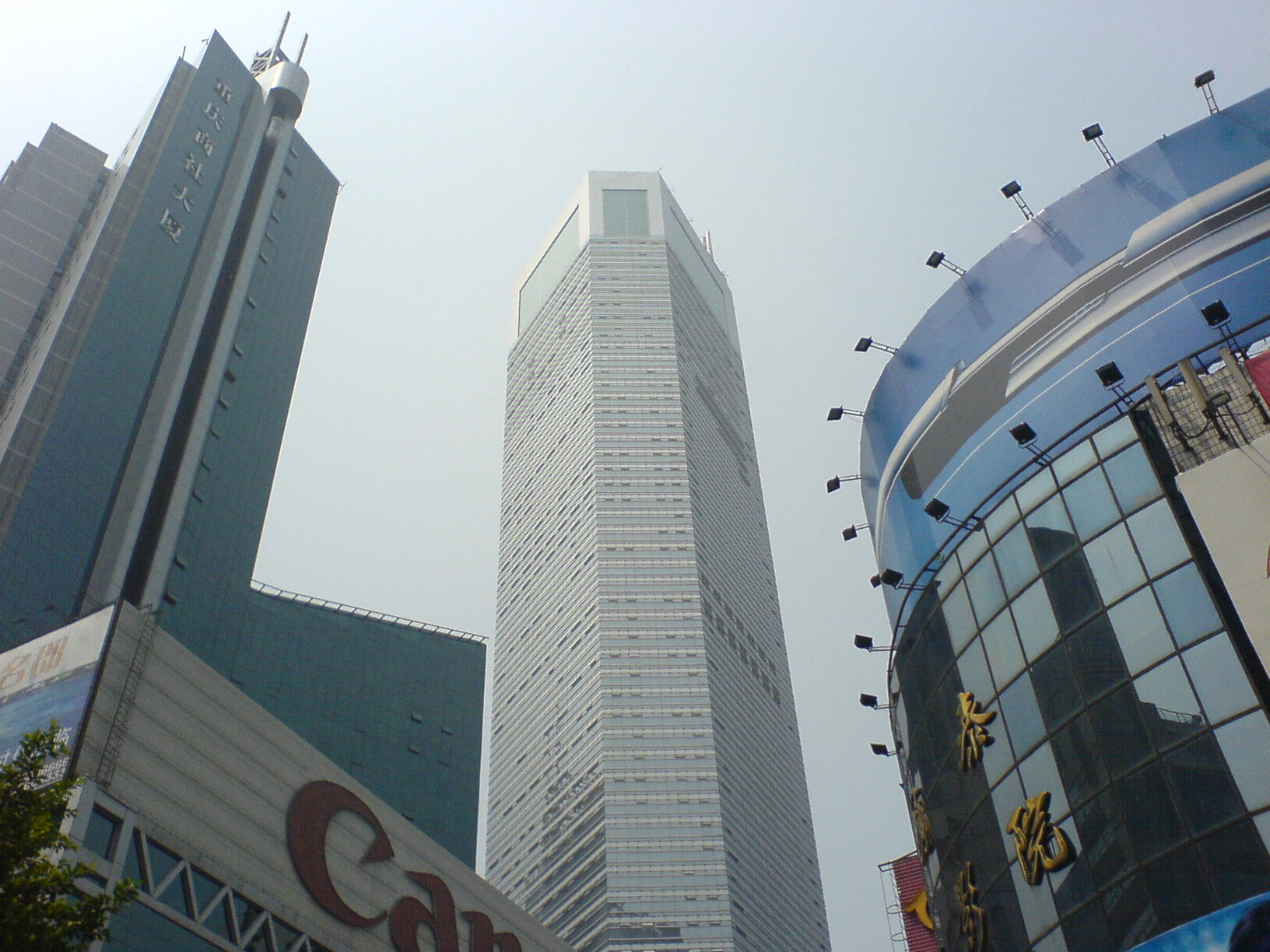
Exterior view.

The Chongqing World Trade Center (WTCC, simplified Chinese: 重庆世界贸易中心; traditional Chinese: 重慶世界貿易中心; pinyin: Chóngqìng Shìjiè Màoyì zhōngxīn) is a 283.1-meter (929 ft)-tall skyscraper located in the Jiefangbei CBD area of Chongqing, China.

The building was completed in 2005 after three years of construction beginning in 2002 and topping out in 2004. The building has 60 floors which can all be accessed by 12 elevators. There are also two underground floors used as car park. CRT Metro Line 2 has an exit at Linjiangmen Station in the World Trade Center's retail podium.

The Chongqing World Trade Center is currently the 54th tallest existing skyscraper in the world when measured up to the spire and is the fourth tallest building in Western China (since being recently eclipsed by several other towers also in Chongqing). The building is 262 meters (860 ft) tall when not including the spire.

== See also ==
- List of skyscrapers
- List of tallest buildings in Chongqing

Preceded by New York New York	Tallest Building in Chongqing; 2005–2012; 283m	Succeeded by Yingli Tower
