= Future International =

General information
- Location: Chongqing, China
- Coordinates: 29°34′38″N 106°31′44.4″E
- Completed: 2007

Height
- Antenna spire: 236 m (774 ft)

Technical details
- Floor count: 54

Future International (simplified Chinese: 未来国际; traditional Chinese: 未來國際; pinyin: Wèilái Guójì) is a 54-floor 236 meter (774 foot) tall skyscraper completed in 2007 located in Chongqing, China.

== See also ==
- List of tallest buildings in the world
