= Chongqing International Trade and Commerce Center =

Coordinates: 29°33′11″N 106°30′49″E

- 重庆陆海国际中心
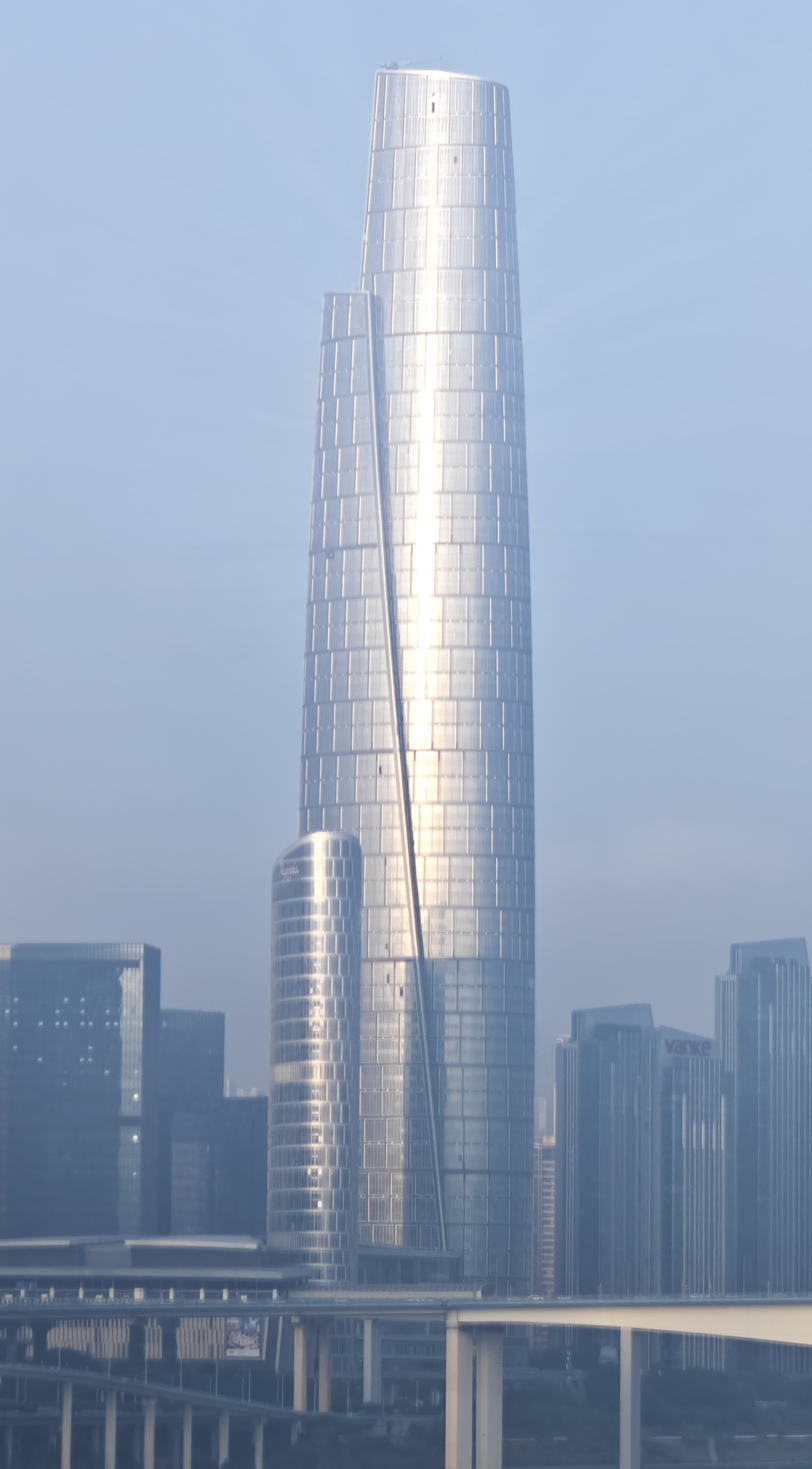
- International Land-Sea Center in October 2025
- Interactive map of the Chongqing International Trade and Commerce Center area
- Alternative names: Chongqing International Trade and Commerce Center 1, Chongqing 100, Vanke Center, Jialing Fanying Tower 1

General information
- Status: Completed
- Location: Chongqing, China
- Groundbreaking: October 30, 2008
- Construction started: April 17, 2012
- Estimated completion: 1 August 2025
- Opening: 30 September 2025
- Owner: Vanke

Height
- Architectural: 458.2 m (1,503 ft)
- Top floor: 429.8 m (1,410 ft)

Technical details
- Floor count: 98
- Floor area: 248,470 m^{2} (2,674,500 ft^{2})

Design and construction
- Architects: Chongqing Architectural Design Institute Co., Ltd., Kohn Pedersen Fox
- Developer: Shui On Group
- Engineer: Arup
- Main contractor: China Construction Third Engineering Bureau

The Chongqing International Trade and Commerce Center is an 11 tower development that is the centerpiece of the 3.6 million-square-meter Chongqing Tian Di Master Plan, a major redevelopment of a downtown core area in Chongqing, China. The main building of the development is the 98 storey International Land-Sea Center, a 458.2 m (1,503 ft) tall mixed use skyscraper. The tower's design is inspired by the sailing ships that once crowded the waters of the surrounding Yangtze and Jialing Rivers. It is the tallest building in Chongqing, and one of the tallest buildings in China.

== History ==
The Chongqing International Trade and Commerce Center was first proposed in 2007 with construction eventually starting in 2012. However, in 2016 the construction slowed dramatically. In late 2019, construction eventually ramped up, and the main tower was topped out in July 2022. The complex is slated for completion in 2025 and will feature office, residential, retail, and entertainment space to bring energy, activity, and value to the site.

== See also ==
- List of tallest buildings in the world
- List of tallest buildings in China
- List of tallest buildings in Chongqing
