= Lanko International Conference & Exhibition Tower D =

Skyscraper in Chongqing, China

- Interactive map of the Lanko International Conference & Exhibition Tower D area

General information
- Type: Skyscraper
- Location: Nan'an District, Chongqing, China
- Coordinates: 10°39′23″N 29°32′04″E
- Construction started: 2006
- Completed: 2010

Height
- Height: 258 m (846 ft)

Technical details
- Floor count: 54

Lanko International Conference & Exhibition Tower D is a 258-metre-tall (846 ft) skyscraper located in the Nan'an District of Chongqing, China.

The skyscraper was started in 2006, completed in 2010, and has 54 floors. It is a tall building complex. Other towers are 163m (45 floors) and 142m tall.
