= United International Mansion =

Coordinates: 29°33′36″N 106°34′42″E

- 重庆联合国际大厦
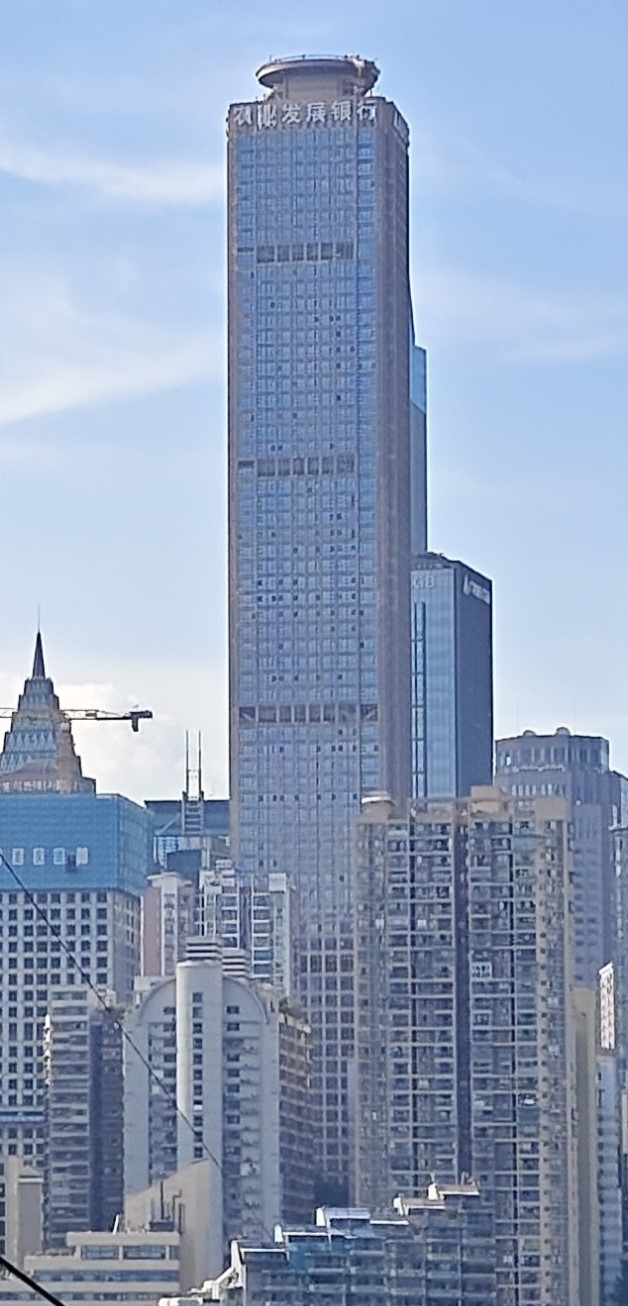
- United International Mansion in October 2025
- Interactive map of the United International Mansion area

General information
- Status: Completed
- Type: Skyscraper
- Location: 201 Xinhua Road, Chongqing, China
- Construction started: 1998
- Completed: 2013
- Owner: Chongqing Magic Real Estate Development Co., Ltd.

Height
- Roof: 287 metres (942 ft)
- Top floor: 287 metres (942 ft)

Technical details
- Floor count: 67 (+5 underground)
- Floor area: 1,260,863 ft^{2} (117,138 m^{2})

Design and construction
- Architects: Chongqing Architecture and Design Institute
- Developer: Chongqing Magic Real Estate Development Co., Ltd.
- Main contractor: China Railway Construction Engineering Group

The United International Mansion (Chinese: 重庆联合国际大厦) is a skyscraper in Chongqing, China. Construction began in 1998. The building was then to measure 238 meters. Construction was suspended the following year, to resume in 2004, according to new plans; the tower was then to culminate at 289 m. It was again stopped in 2005, to finally restart in 2008, to end up with the current building. Is a late-modernist skyscraper made of reinforced concrete in Chongqing, China completed in 2013.

As of 2014, it has the 8th-highest helipad in the world at 286 m (942 ft).

== See also ==
- List of tallest buildings in Chongqing
- List of tallest buildings in China
