= Liberation Monument in Chongqing =

Monument in Yuzhong, Chongqing, China

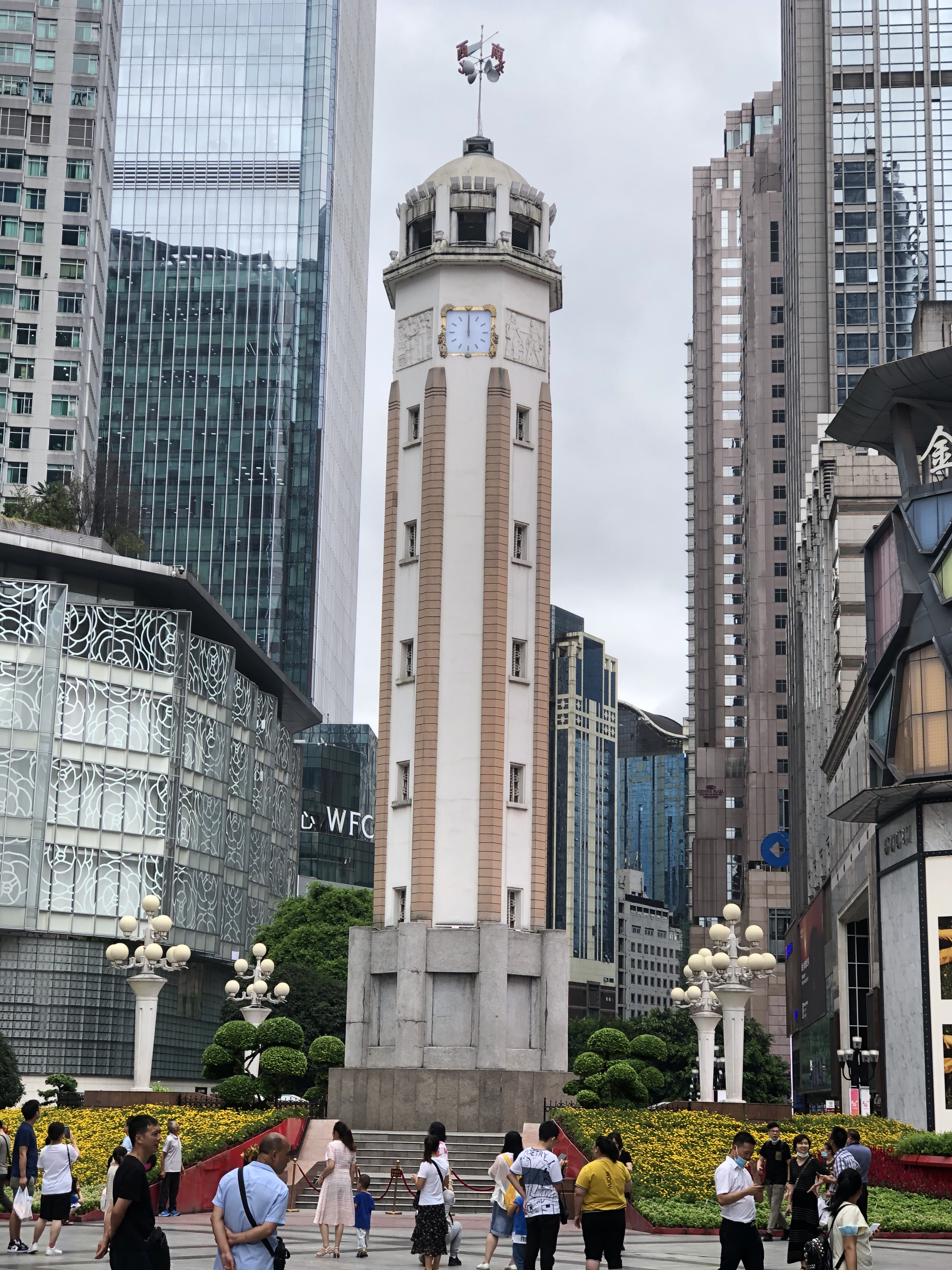
Jiefangbei monument in 2020

Jiefangbei, originally known as the War Victory Monument, is located in the heart of the central business district of Jiefangbei in Yuzhong District, Chongqing, China, at the intersection of Minzu Road, Minquan Road and Zourong Road, and is a landmark of Chongqing.

Construction began in 1946 and was completed in 1947. The monument originally commemorated victory in the Second Sino-Japanese War, but it was renamed as Chongqing People's Liberation Monument to commemorate the liberation of Chongqing by the Chinese People's Liberation Army in 1949.

== Construction ==
The War Victory Monument, one of the projects to implement the "10-year plan or the construction of the accompanying capital", was specially set up as a preparatory committee, with Huang Baoxun and Liu Daren leading the planning work. The building was designed by architect Lai Lun Kit, assisted by civil engineer Li Jifen, architects Tang Benshan, Zhang Zhifan and Guo Minzhan, and electrical equipment by electrical engineer Li Chung Yue. The construction work was carried out by the Tianfu Construction Factory, and the foundation stone was laid by Mayor Zhang Dulun on 31 October 1946, with a total cost of 183 million yuan (217 million yuan was spent on the construction of the monument): the money was collected in advance by means of fundraising, ranging from as little as two to hundreds of thousands of yuan, representing the hearts of millions of Chinese people and the common goal of the whole country after the victory in the war.

The entire monument is located in Du Post Street Square, Minquan Road, and covers a circular plot of 20 metres in diameter, constituting the following:

1. Monument platform: A 10-metre radius circular green stone platform (1.6 metres high), with 8 steps of green stone steps around the perimeter and 8 flowerbeds for planting flowers and trees.
2. The pedestal: 8-sided stone monument, made of gorge stone produced in Beibei, with 8 boulder bollards forming the monument pillars, which are embedded outside the pedestal, inscribed with five inscriptions (1) the full text of the National Government's explicit designation of Chongqing as the accompanying capital; 2) the inscription written by Zhang Qun, the head of the National Government's Chongqing administration and acting director; 3) the inscription written by Wu Dingchang, the head of the National Government's civil service; 4) the name of the monument inscribed by Mayor Zhang Dulun; 5) the inscription of the Chongqing Municipal Senate.
3. The monument has a height of 24 meters and comprises a cylinder with a diameter of 4 meters. Its interior is rounded, while the exterior is octagonal with each corner lined with beige glazed bricks. The monument's interior features a cantilevered spiral staircase with 140 steps leading to the observation deck. Along the staircase is a victory corridor, displaying oiled faces of war heroes and the signatures of the Japanese surrender. Additionally, the lower section contains commemorative objects and inscriptions by celebrities, presented by various provinces and municipalities. The wall of the monument has a commemorative steel tube, containing the design drawings of the project and the signatures of the individuals involved, along with representative cultural masterpieces, newspapers, stamps, and banknotes. The Victory Corridor includes a translation of the scroll presented to the city of Chongqing by US President Roosevelt in 1943.
4. The observation deck (with a circular observation deck at the bottom of the monument rising to 24 metres): 4.5 metres in diameter, wider than the monument, allowing 20 people to visit.
5. The four sides of the monument facing the road under the observation deck are covered with a standard clock (the clock is located at a point where it rises to 23 metres along the cantilevered spiral staircase), and between the clock faces are four relief sculptures of war heroes and soldiers from the army, navy and air force, as well as workers and farmers from the rear.
6. The single platform is topped with an anemometer, an anemometer, a north compass and related weather measuring instruments.

The monument is built with 25 tonnes of steel and 900 barrels of cement (950 barrels of cement were used for the construction work, of which 150 barrels were imported from Italy, when the cement was packed in wooden barrels at a standard of 170 kg per barrel), with reinforced concrete windows on each level of the monument, the main door made of specially selected nan wood, and the interior and exterior walls finished in white cement. The electrical equipment: 8 mercury sunlamps around the top of the monument, 1 mercury lamp on each level of the interior, and 8 powerful searchlights for external lighting, which are projected from all sides of the monument to reveal the entire monument in 8 soft rays of light.

== History ==
=== Before the Second Sino-Japanese War ===
The area around the current Jiefangbei was originally called "Governor's Post Street", named after the government-run post office that was located here. At that time, there were only a few pharmacies, silk shops and companies selling literary treasures, while the rest were residential houses such as the Yang Family Compound and the Zhou Family Compound. At the intersection of the four narrow lanes of the post office, there was a vacant area of only a few dozen square metres, known as "Dashizi", which is now the centre of Jiefangbei.

=== Spiritual fortress ===
The former location of the monument was initially occupied by a seven-foot-tall wooden structure known as the Spiritual Fortress, which took on the form of a square conical turret and was erected in November 1940 before being dismantled in October 1946. This edifice served as an emblem of unwavering determination to fight until the very end and to foster a spirit of resistance.

The Second Sino-Japanese War was incorporated into the Second World War in December 1941, when China forged an alliance with the United States and the United Kingdom to combat the Japanese-German-Italian Axis following Japan's initiation of the Pacific War.

On 12 March 1940, the National Government hosted the construction of the "Corporate signboard" in the centre of the Duoyou Street Square in Chongqing, which was completed on 31 December 1941. "It is a wooden structure, quadrilateral in shape and in the form of a running tower, seven feet seven feet high (about 26 metres), with a spiral staircase to the top, and a clock, directional signs and a wind speed and wind direction meter on top. The monument was built by the then Nationalist Government to inspire the people of China to fight against the war and to encourage them to fight to the end, and was named the 'Spiritual fortress'. The "seven feet" symbolises the "Marco Polo Bridge Incident".

=== The War Victory Monument ===
After the Second Sino-Japanese War, the National Government built the "War Victory Monument" on the site of the "Corporate signboard" to commemorate the nation's military and civilians.

On October 31, 1946, the foundation stone for the new monument was laid at the original site of the "Spirit Fortress" bomb crater. In December of that year, construction work began on a reinforced concrete structure with an octagonal column and helmet roof to replace the old monument. The completed monument, known as the Monument of Discipline or Victory in the War of Resistance, took its shape from that of the Liberation Monument. In the Liberation Monument, a letter from US President Roosevelt to the people of Chongqing on the occasion of the victory in World War II is still in place.

=== Chongqing People's Liberation Monument ===
On 30 November 1949, the Chinese People's Liberation Army captured the main city of Chongqing. On 1 October 1950, the Southwest Military Affairs Commission changed the text and design on the monument, and Liu Bocheng changed the inscription to "Chongqing People's Liberation Monument", shortened to "Liberation Monument", from commemorating victory in the Second Sino-Japanese War to commemorating the liberation of Chongqing.

=== Cultural protection ===
The monument was listed as the second batch of municipal cultural relics protection units in Chongqing on 23 January 1987. It was announced as the third batch of provincial key cultural relics protection units in Sichuan Province on 16 April 1991. It was listed as the seventh batch of national key cultural relics protection units on 5 March 2013.

== Gallery ==
=== Completion Ceremony (1947) ===
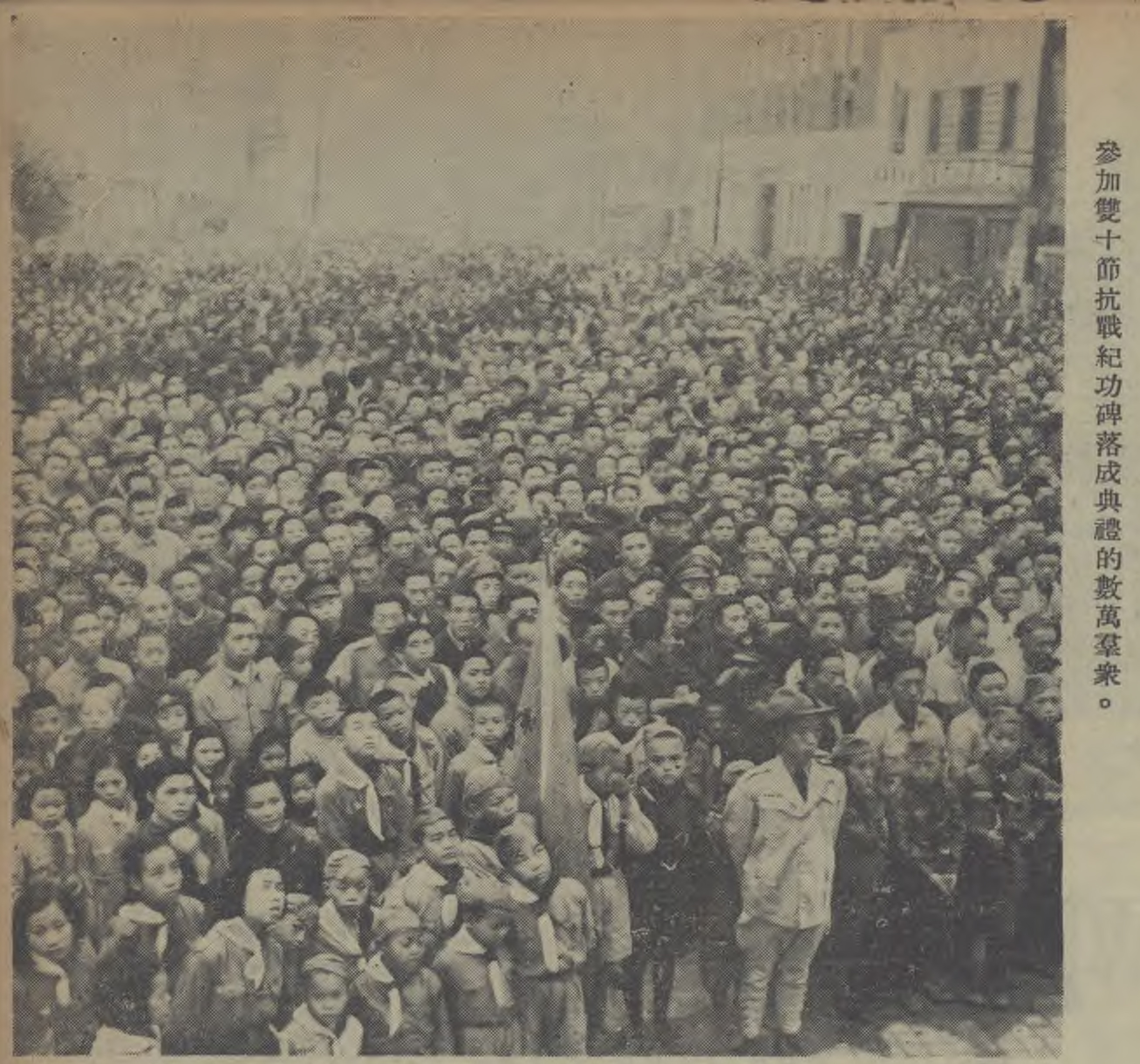
Tens of thousands of people attend the inauguration ceremony of the Double Ten Day War Memorial

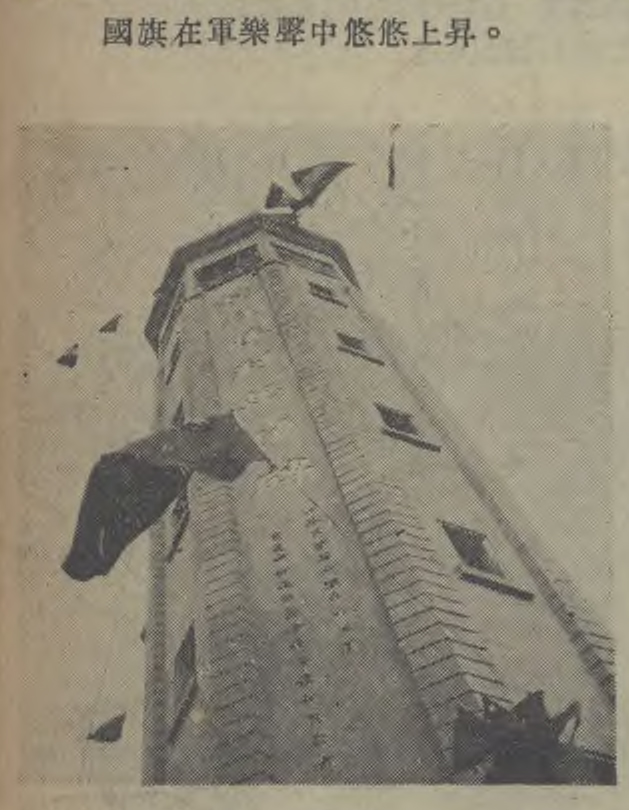
The national flag was raised to the sound of military music

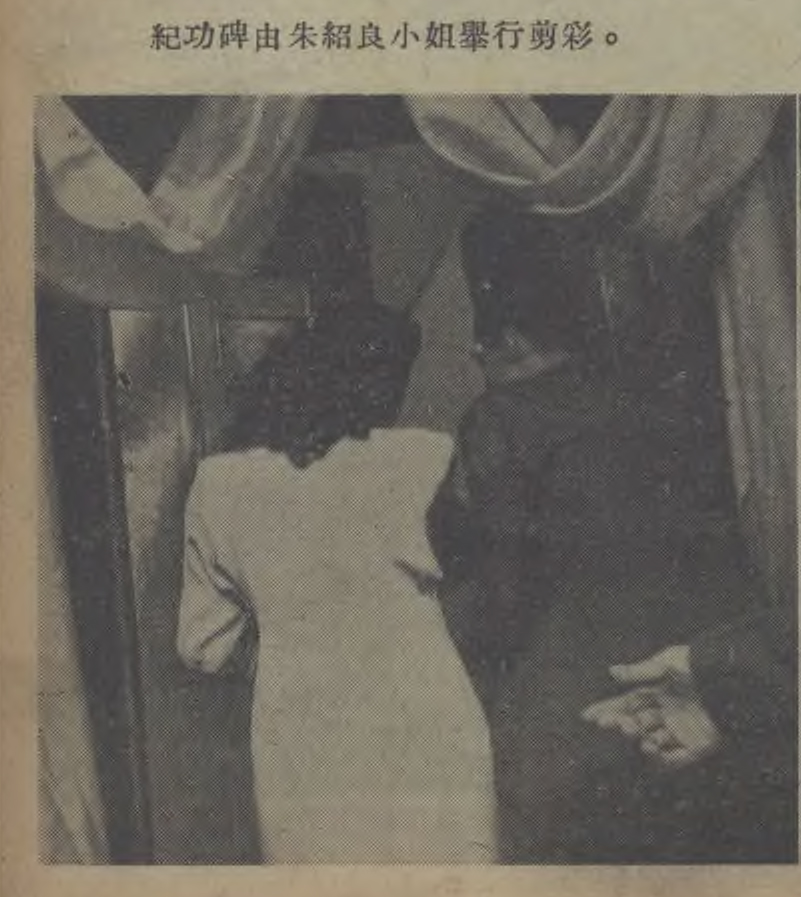
The plaque was cut by Zhu Shaoliang

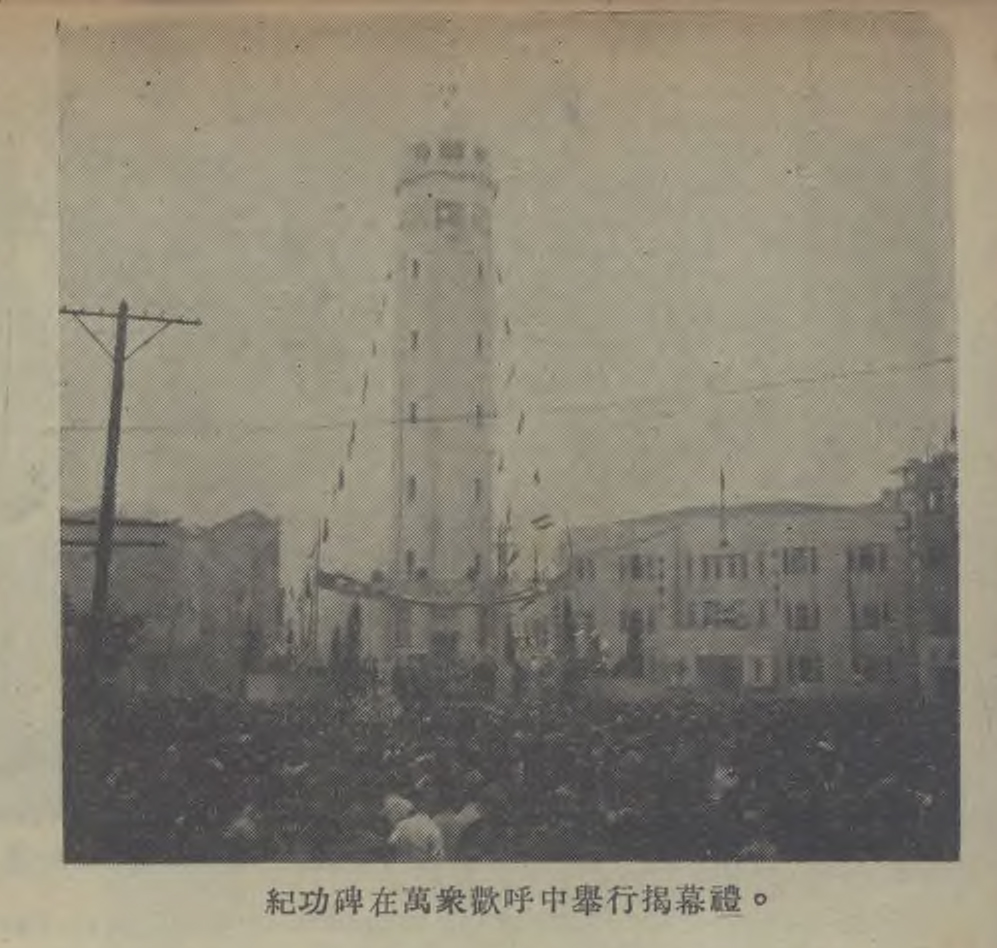
Ji Gong Monument in the crowd cheers held the opening ceremony

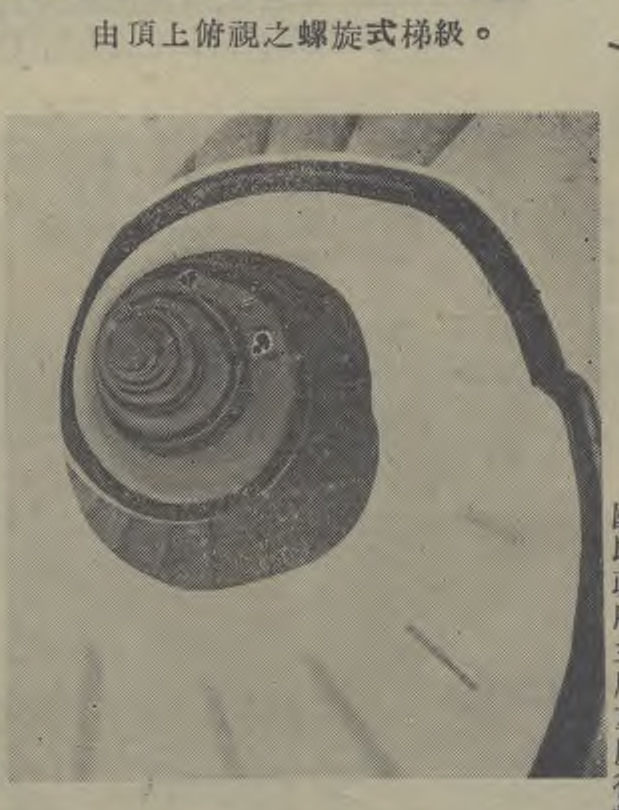
Spiral staircase from the top

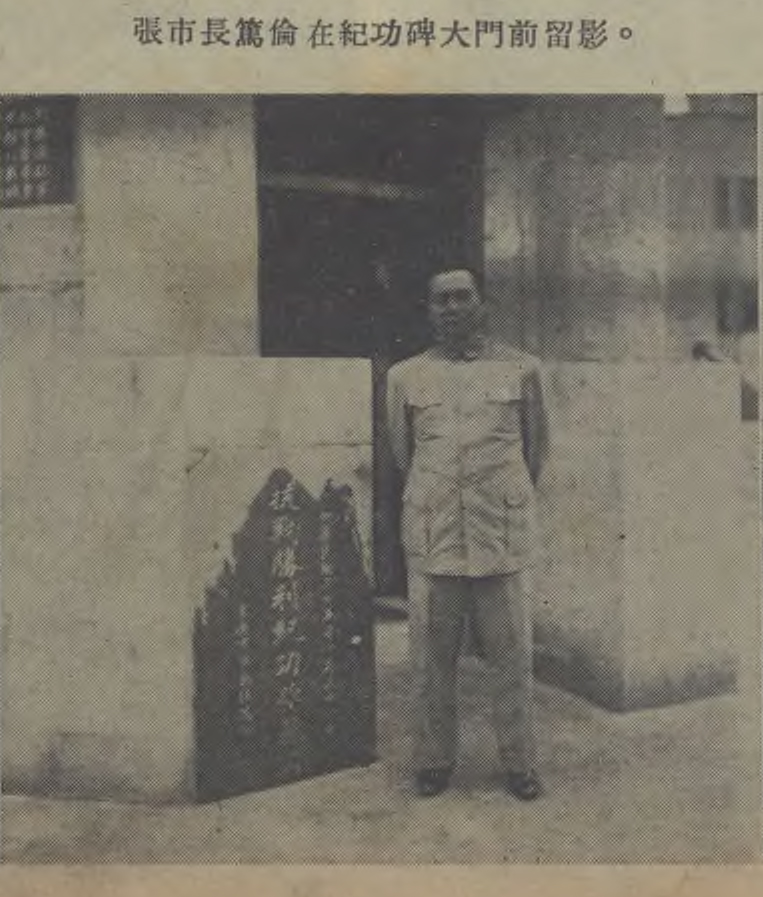
Zhang Dulun takes a photo in front of the gate of the Ji Gong Monument

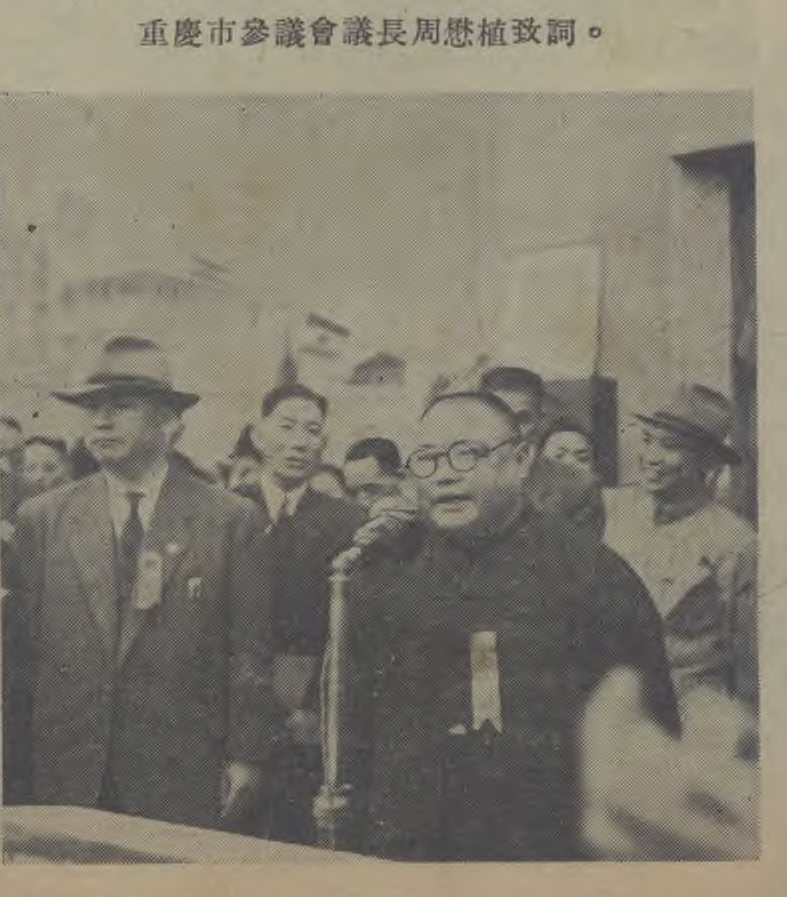
Speech by Zhou Maozhi, President of Chongqing Municipal Senate

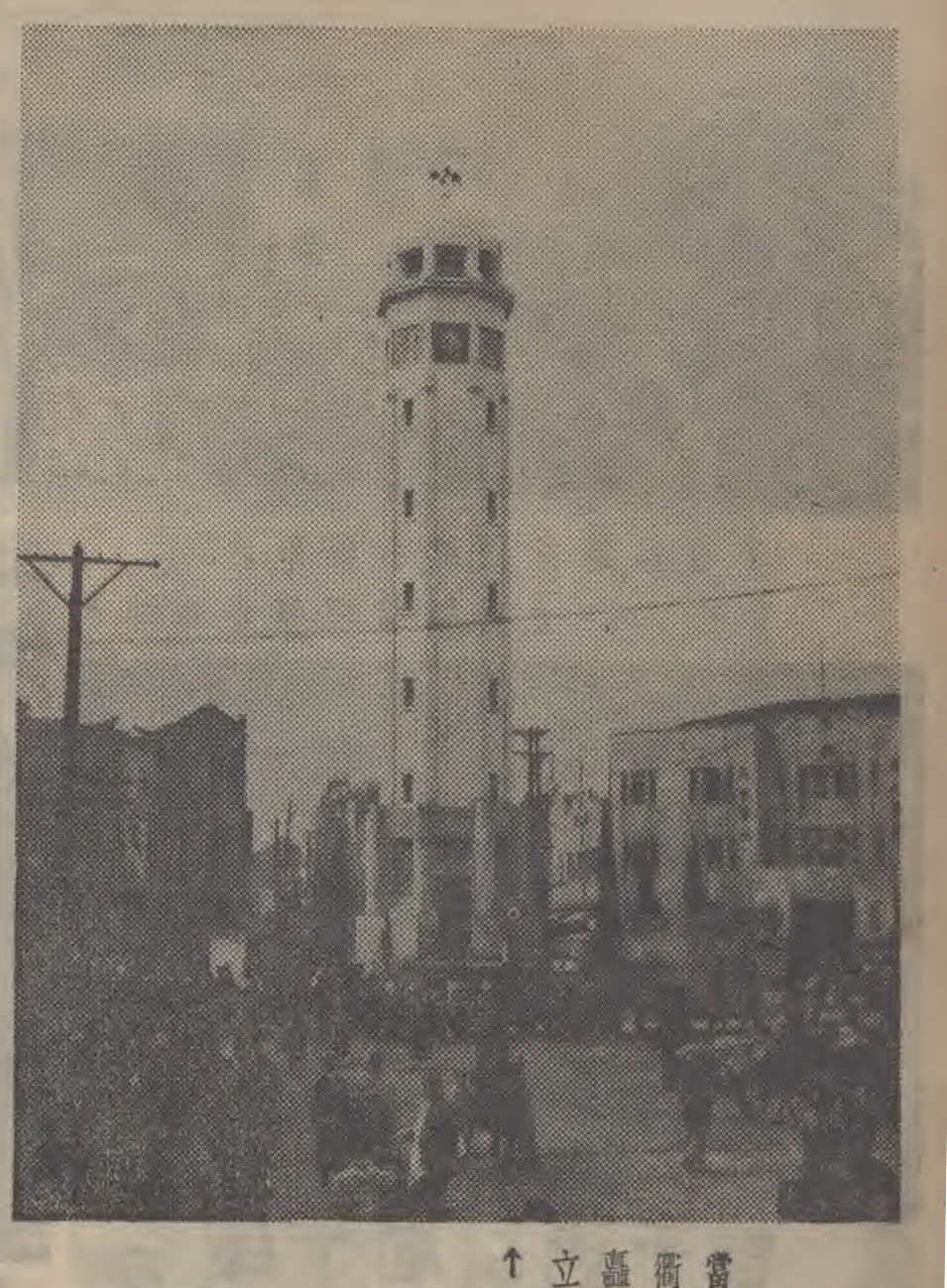
Street stands

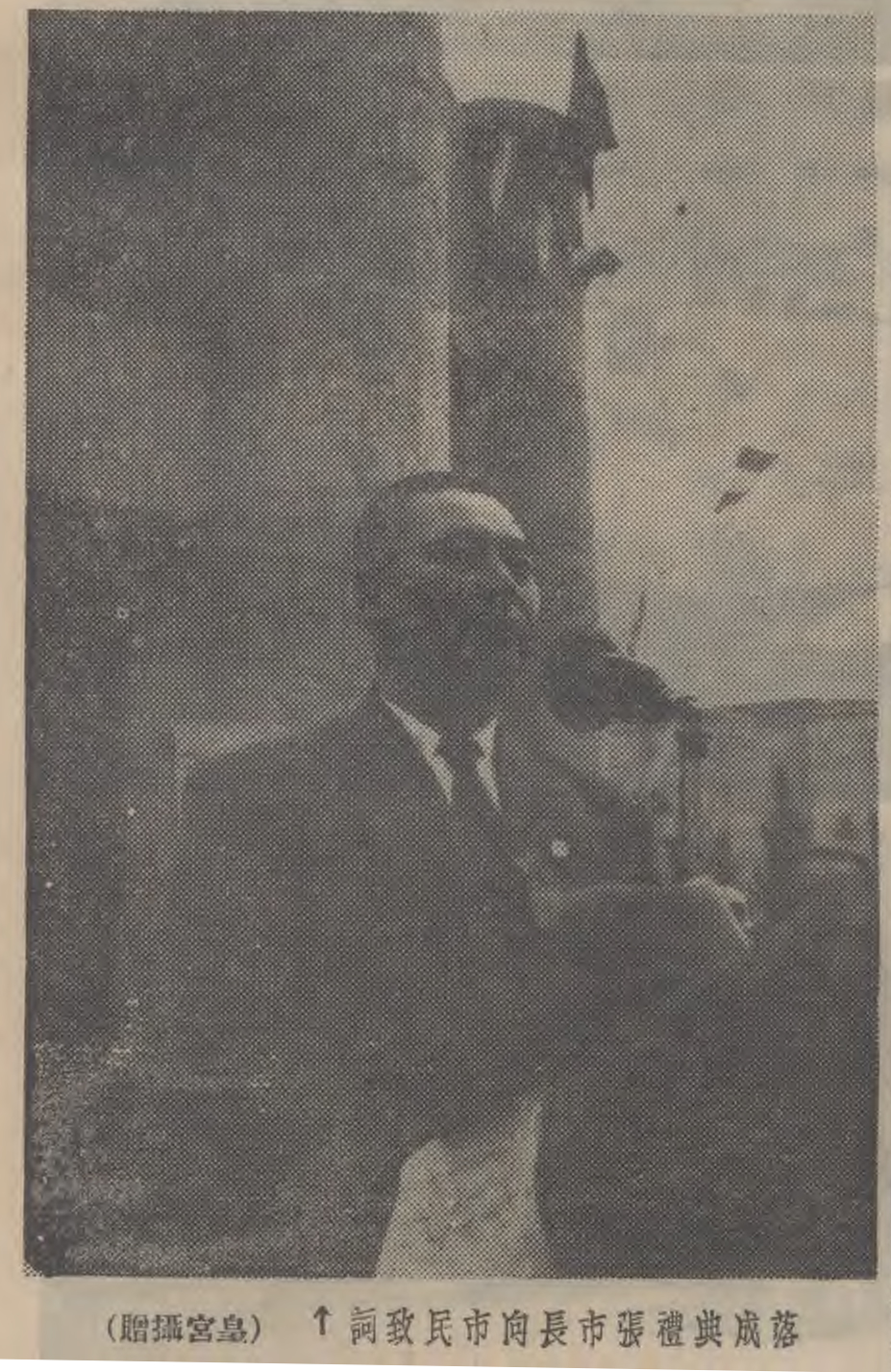
Mayor Zhang speaks to the public at the completion ceremony

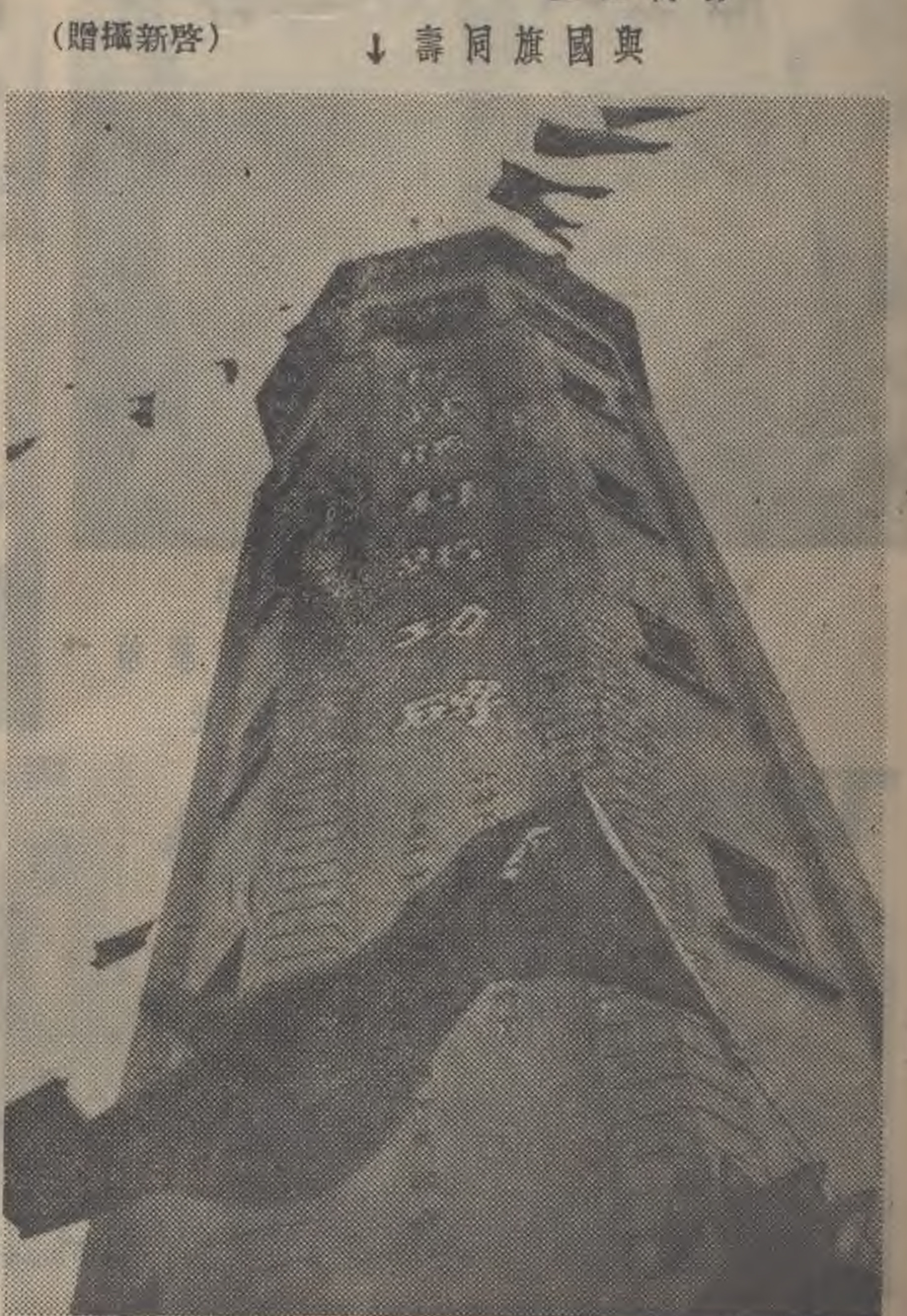
Live with the Flag

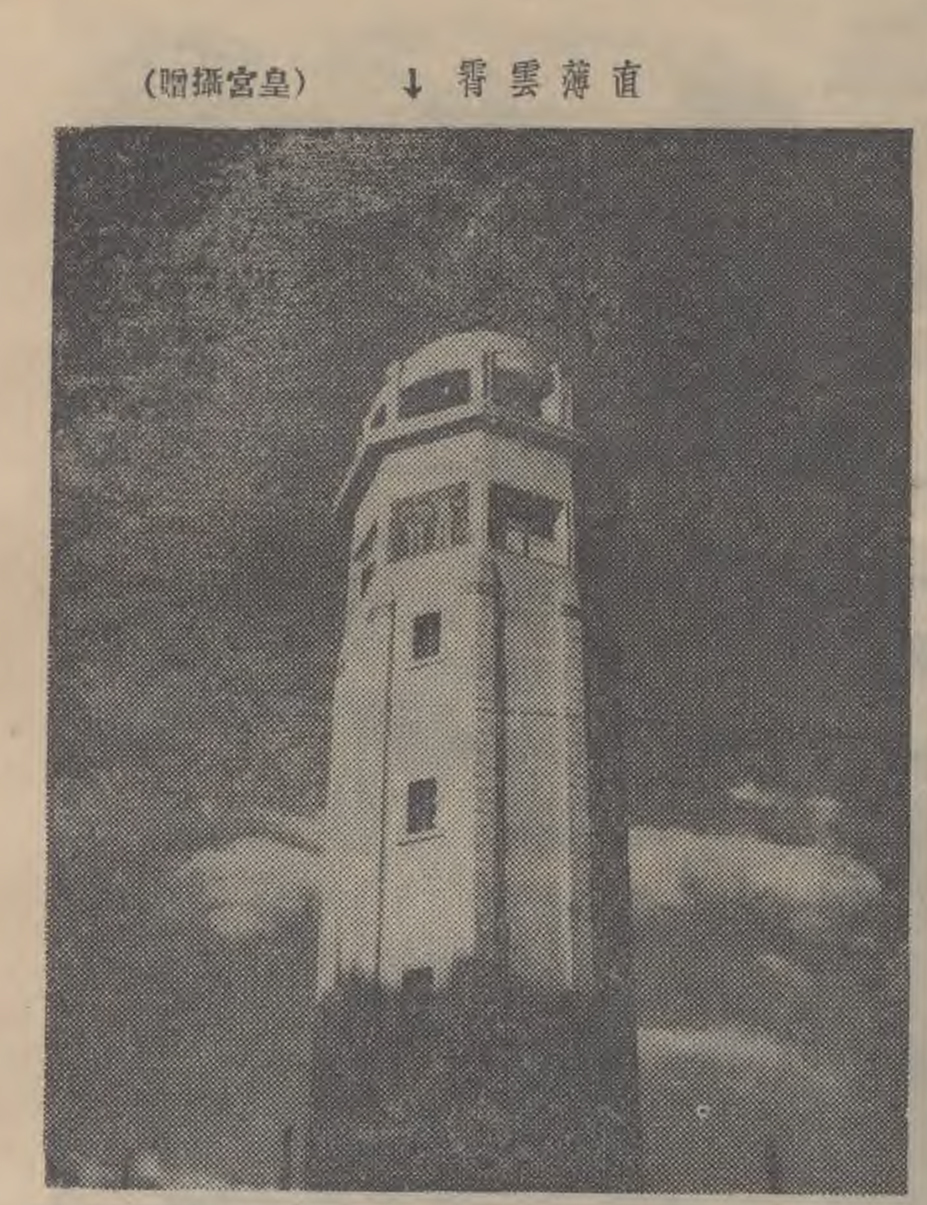

=== Current status ===
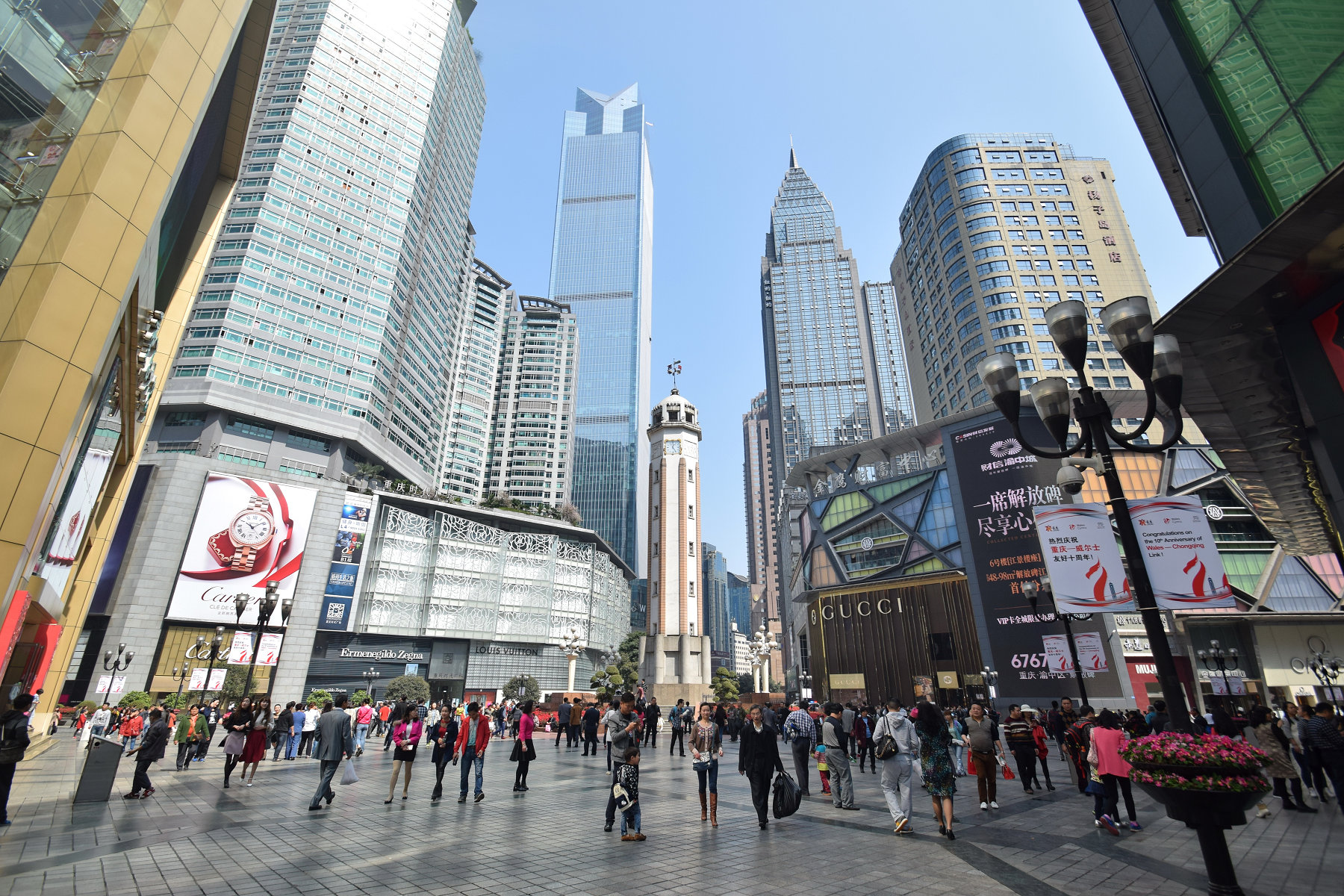
A commercial area and pedestrian street have been built around the Jiefangbei

Around Jiefangbei Business District

== See also ==
- Jiefangbei CBD
