= Chongqing Poly Tower =

Skyscraper in Chongqing, China

Coordinates: 29.5571°N 106.5710°E

- 重庆保利国际广场
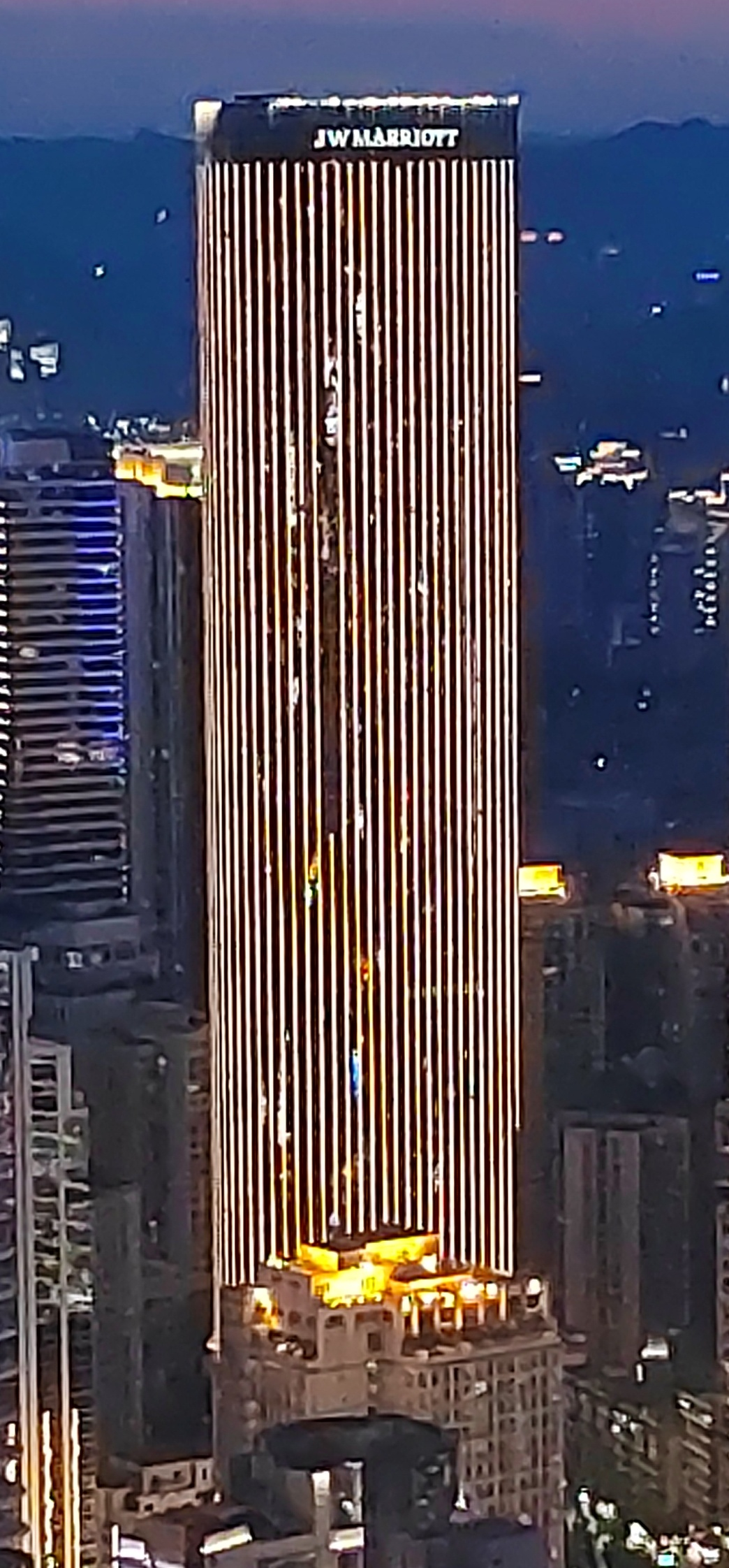
- Chongqing Poly Tower at night in 2024
- Interactive map of the Chongqing Poly Tower area

General information
- Status: Completed
- Type: Skyscraper
- Location: 235 Minsheng Road, Yuzhong District, Chongqing, China
- Construction started: 2007
- Completed: 2013
- Cost: 1.3 billion RMB

Height
- Architectural: 286.8 m (941 ft)

Technical details
- Floor count: 61(+6 underground)
- Floor area: 2,045,143 ft^{2} (190,000.0 m^{2})

Design and construction
- Architecture firm: ECADI
- Structural engineer: ECADI

Other information
- Parking: 700

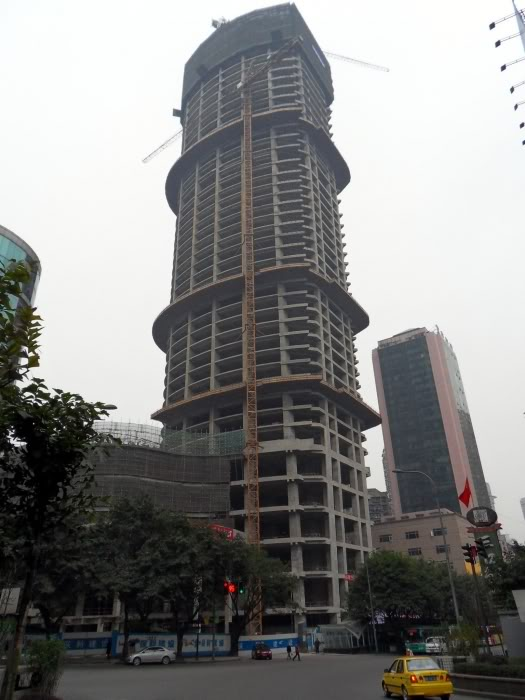
Chongqing Poly Tower under construction

Chongqing Poly Tower is a skyscraper in Chongqing, China.

Situated at the site of former Chongqing hotel, the building sits on 11831 square meters of land at the junction Linjiangmen and Minsheng Road in the central business district (Jiefangbei) of Chongqing. It consists of offices, hotel rooms, and retail.

It contains office and hotel space. The building was topped out on June 18, 2010 and completed in 2013. It is the third tallest building in Chongqing.

== See also ==
- List of tallest buildings in Chongqing
