= Lanko Grand Hyatt Hotel =

Hotel building in Chongqing, China

Coordinates: 29°31′56.6″N 106°33′44.7″E

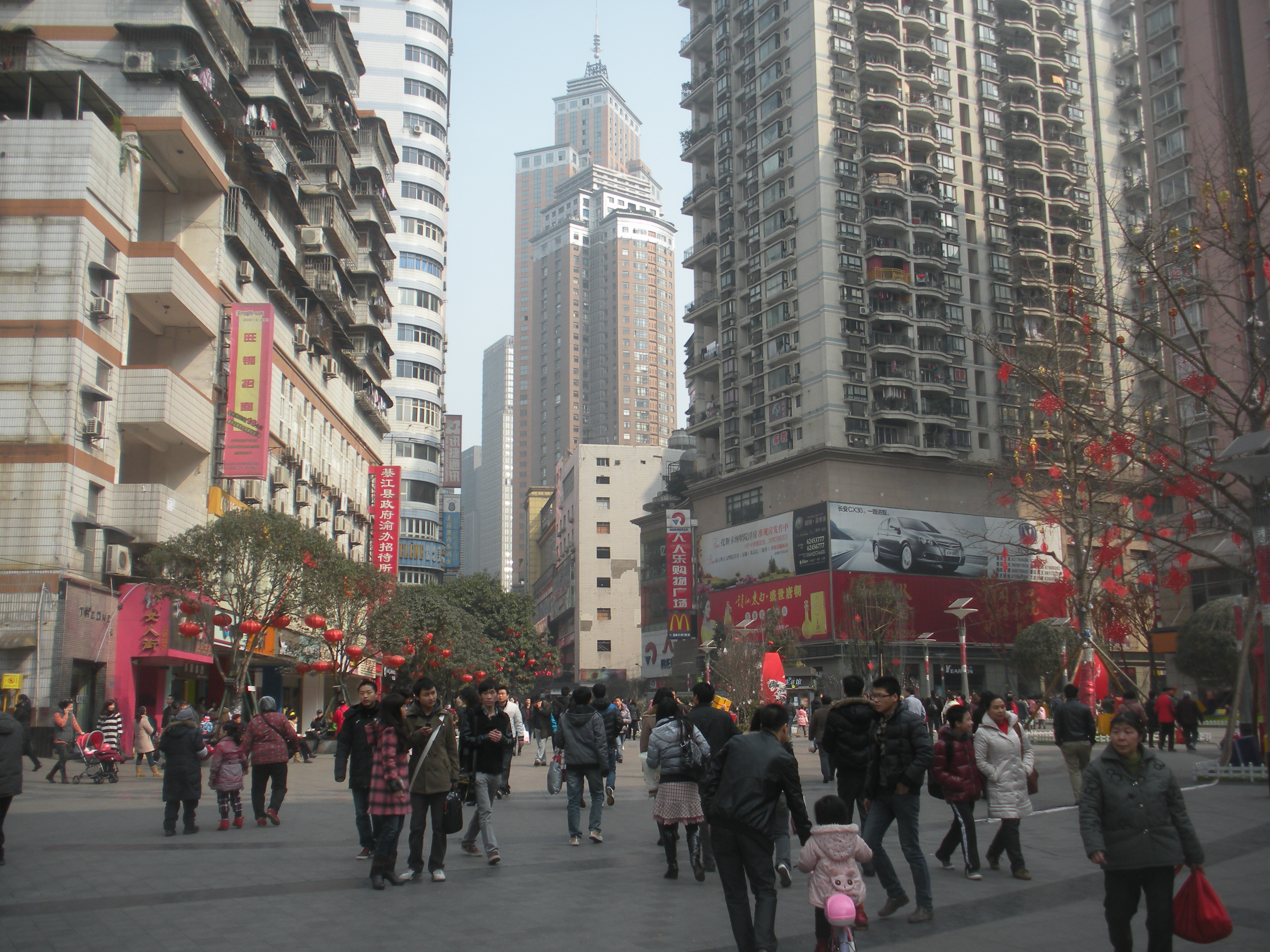

The Grand Hyatt Lanko (in Chinese: 浪高·君悦大酒店/君悦A座) was a planned 258-metre (846 foot)-tall, 60-story skyscraper located in the Nan'an District of Chongqing, China.

== See also ==
- List of skyscrapers
