= Chongqing Tall Tower =

Under-construction skyscraper in Chongqing, China

Coordinates: 29°33′27″N 106°34′15″E

- 重庆国际金融中心

General information
- Status: On-hold (resumption is scheduled for May 2027)
- Type: Office
- Location: 77 Qing Nian Road Yuzhong District, Chongqing, China
- Construction started: 2017
- Completed: TBD

Height
- Antenna spire: 431 m (1,414 ft)
- Roof: 431 m (1,414 ft)

Technical details
- Floor count: 101
- Floor area: 197,000 m^{2} (2,120,000 ft^{2})
- Lifts/elevators: 56

Design and construction
- Architects: Woods Bagot; ECADI

Chongqing Tall Tower is a supertall skyscraper with 101 floors and with a roof height of 431 m (1,414 ft) planned for Chongqing, China. The design has gone through several versions, requiring the demolition of the base for a previous version of the project, but the project was cancelled in December 2022.

== See also ==
- List of tallest buildings in China
- List of tallest buildings in Chongqing
- List of buildings with 100 floors or more
