= Dongguan TBA Tower =

Skyscraper in China

Coordinates: 23.0165°N 113.7580°E

- 东莞台商大厦
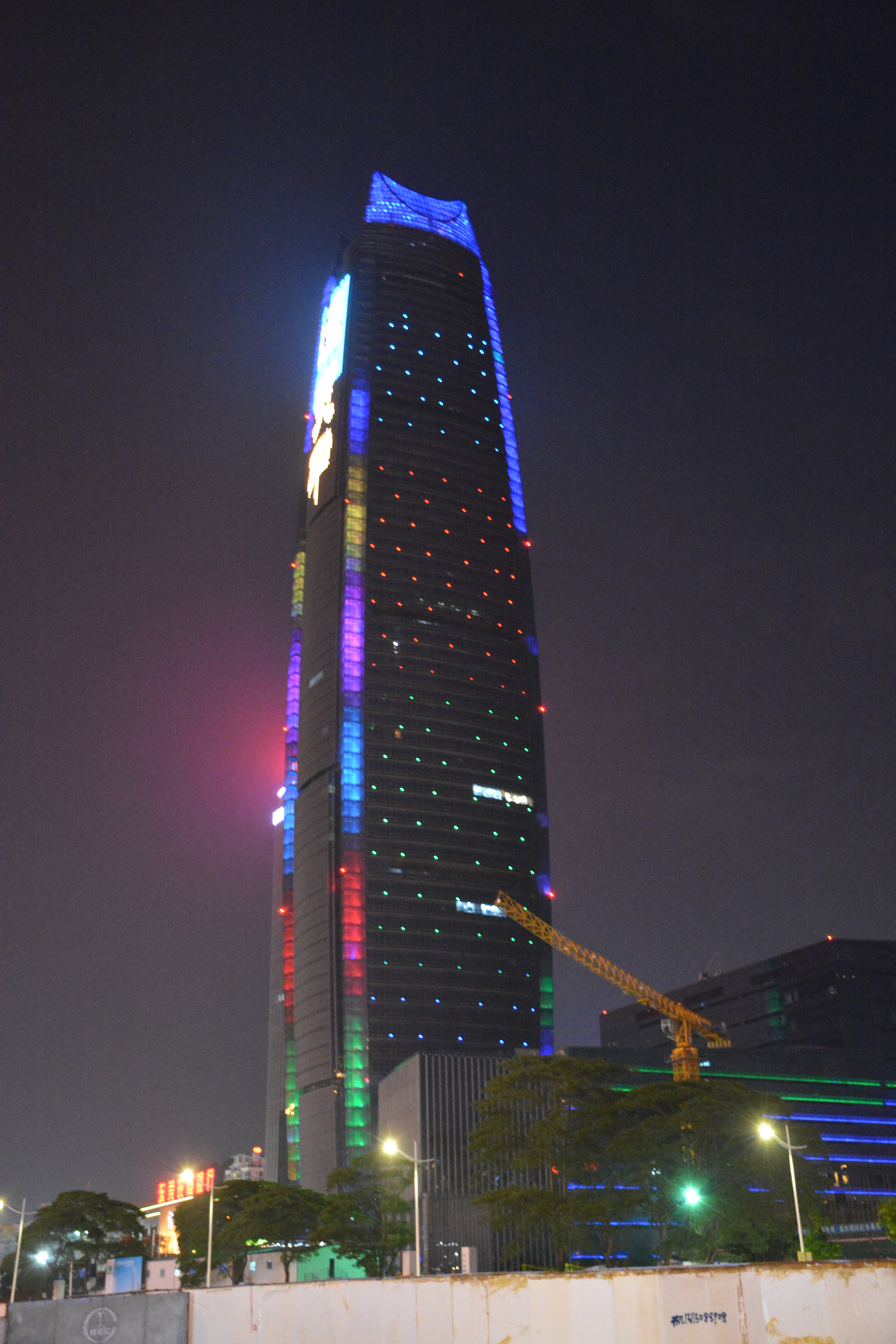
- Interactive map of the Dongguan TBA Tower area

General information
- Status: Completed
- Location: Dongguan, China
- Construction started: 2008
- Completed: 2013

Height
- Height: 350 m (1,150 ft)

Technical details
- Floor count: 73

Design and construction
- Architect: Liu Wei-Yan
- Architecture firm: HTA-Architecture & Partners
- Structural engineer: Archiman Design Group Liu Wei-Yan Architects

Dongguan TBA Tower is a skyscraper in Dongguan, China. It is named after the Taiwan Businessmen Association in Dongguan. The architectural design of the building was planned and designed by Archiman Design Group from Taichung City, Taiwan, in collaboration with Liu Wei-Yan Architects.
