= List of tallest buildings in China =

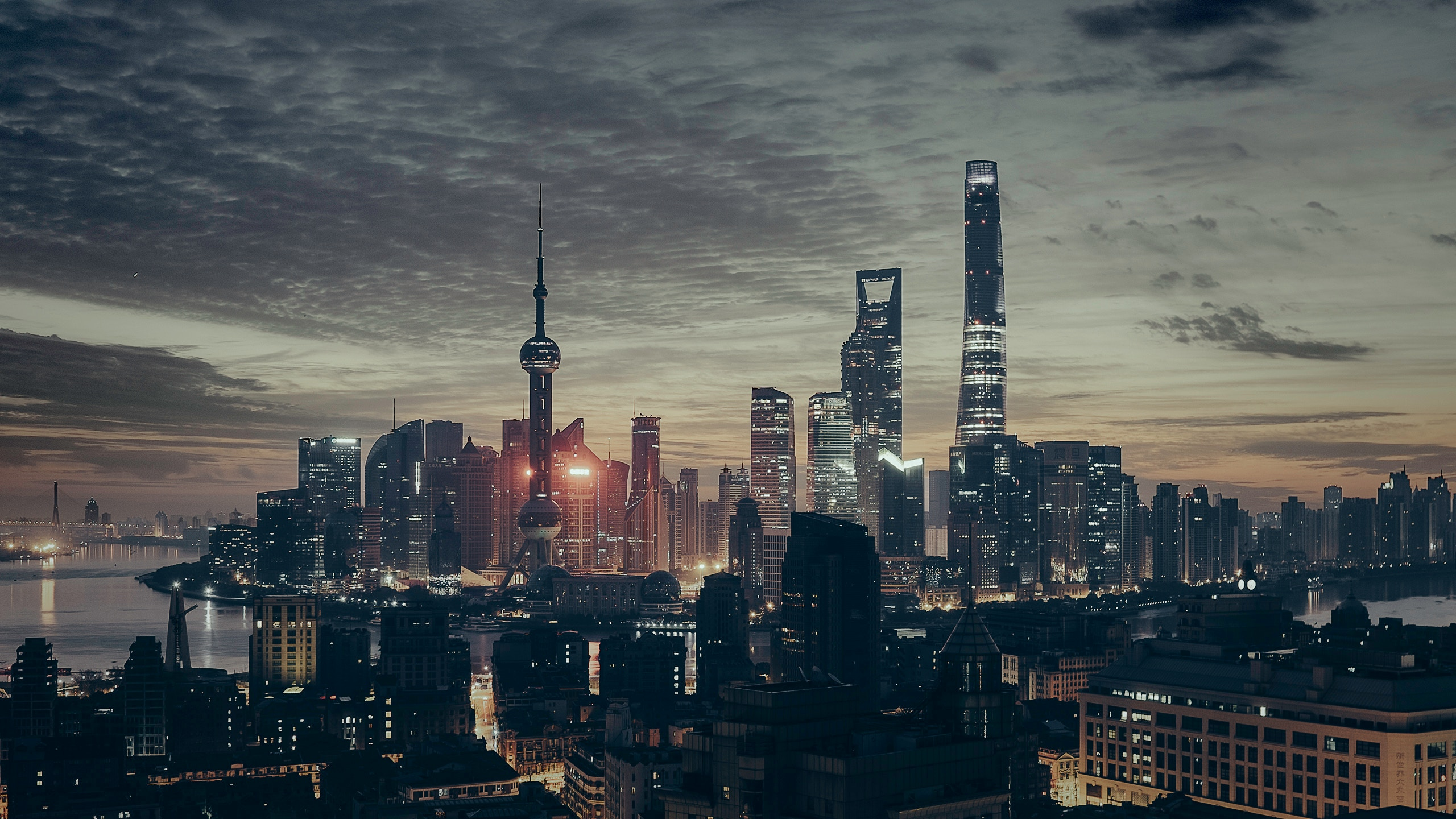
Shanghai skyline, which features a supertall cluster and the megatall Shanghai Tower

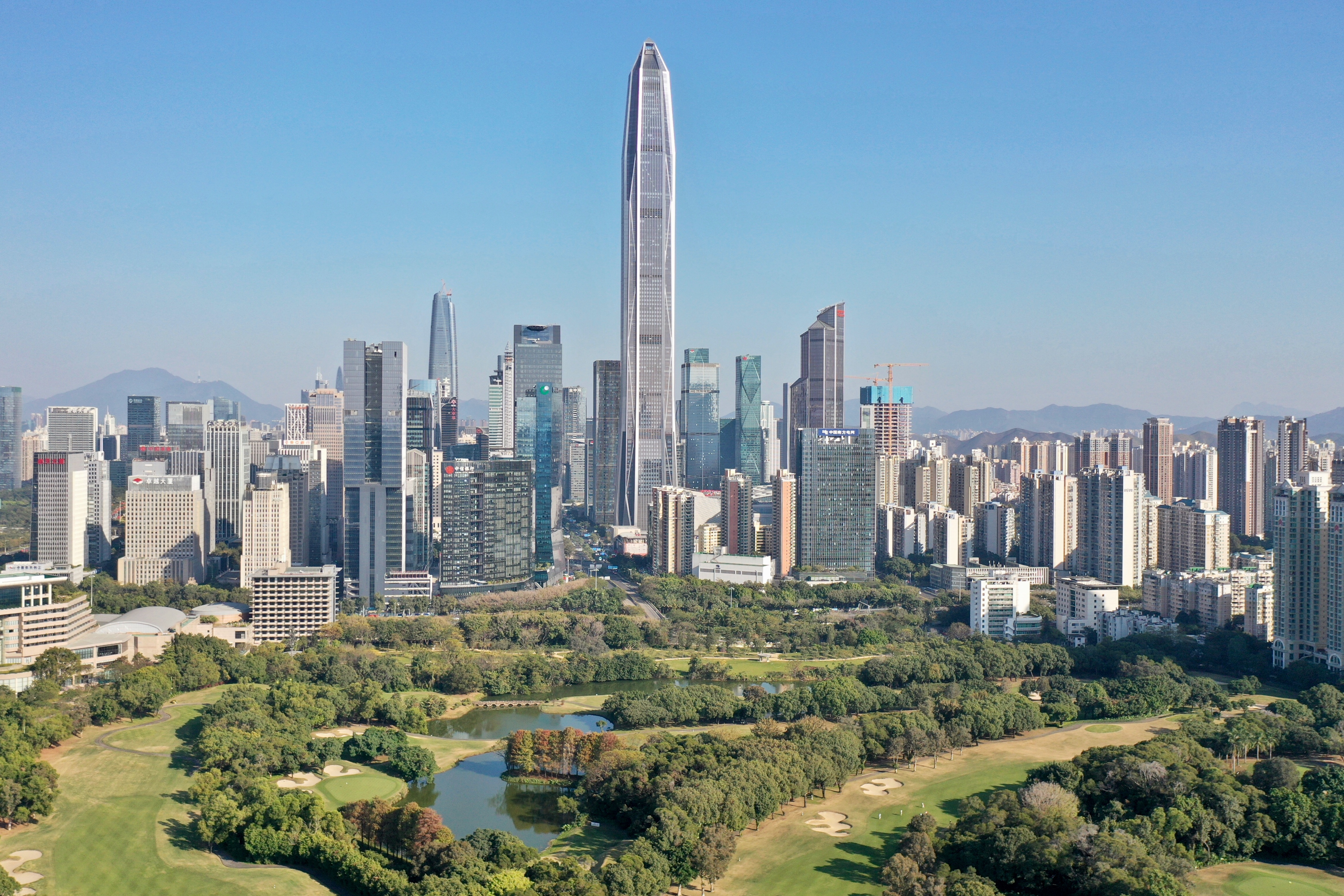
Shenzhen skyline, with the Ping An International Finance Centre

China has the largest number of skyscrapers in the world, surpassing that of the top eleven largest, the United States (870+), United Arab Emirates (310+), South Korea (270+), Japan (270+), Malaysia (260+), Australia (140+), Indonesia (130+), Canada (130+), Philippines (120+) and Thailand (120+) combined. As of 2023, China has more than 3,000 buildings above 150 m (490 ft), of which 106 are supertall (300 m (980 ft) and above).

China is the location of five of the world's ten tallest buildings. 39 of the 76 completed buildings with a minimum height of 350 m (1,150 ft) worldwide are in China, while 44 out of 51 such buildings under construction in the world are also located in the country. China has also been a leader in construction technologies for skyscrapers, with 70 percent of the buildings over 300 m (980 ft) in the world being built by Chinese companies.

The tallest building in China is currently the Shanghai Tower, located in the namesake city at a height of 632 m (2,073 ft); it is the third tallest building in the world. The previous two tallest buildings in mainland China have also been in Shanghai. Hong Kong is the Chinese city with the most skyscrapers, while Shenzhen has the most number of supertalls.

In June 2020, China's National Development and Reform Commission (NDRC) imposed a ban on the construction of super high-rise buildings taller than 500 m (1,600 ft), due to safety reasons and waste of resources. In October 2021, the Chinese government announced restrictions on the construction of supertall buildings. The country's Ministry of Housing and Urban-Rural Development (MOHURD) said the action is driven by concerns on "issues such as costs, energy consumption, safety, and environmental impact".

== Tallest buildings ==
As it is impractical to list all of its skyscrapers, the table below is an incomplete list of skyscrapers in China, ranking buildings that stand at least 280 metres (920 ft) tall, sorted by height. This list includes skyscrapers in the special administrative regions of Hong Kong and Macau.

This list does not include nonbuilding structures, such as the 604 m (1,982 ft) Canton Tower in Guangzhou, which despite being the second tallest structure in China, is actually an observation tower.

Of the 143 buildings in this list, 52 are in Shenzhen, 26 are in Guangzhou, 15 are in Shanghai, 9 are in Hong Kong, 2 are in Beijing, and 2 are in Tianjin.

Was/Is the tallest building in China upon completion
Indicates buildings that have been architecturally topped out

Rank	Name	Chinese name	Image	City	Height	Floors	Year	Pinnacle height	Occupied height									
1	Shanghai Tower	上海中心大厦		Shanghai	632 m (2,073 ft)	128	2015	632 m (2,073 ft)	583.4 m (1,914 ft)									
2	Ping An International Finance Centre	平安国际金融中心		Shenzhen	599.1 m (1,966 ft)	118	2017	599.1 m (1,966 ft)	562.2 m (1,844 ft)									
3	Goldin Finance 117	中国117大厦		Tianjin	596.6 m (1,957 ft)	128	2027	596.6 m (1,957 ft)	584.1 m (1,916 ft)									
4 =	Tianjin CTF Finance Centre	天津周大福濱海中心		Tianjin	530 m (1,739 ft)	97	2019	530.4 m (1,740 ft)	439.4 m (1,442 ft)									
4 =	Guangzhou CTF Finance Centre	广州周大福金融中心		Guangzhou	530 m (1,739 ft)	111	2016	530 m (1,739 ft)	495.5 m (1,626 ft)									
6	China Zun	中国尊		Beijing	527.7 m (1,731 ft)	109	2018	527.7 m (1,731 ft)	515.5 m (1,691 ft)									
7	Shanghai World Financial Center	上海环球金融中心	上海国际金融中心	Shanghai	492 m (1,614 ft)	101	2008	494.3 m (1,622 ft)	474 m (1,555 ft)									
8	International Commerce Centre	環球貿易廣場		Hong Kong	484 m (1,588 ft)	108	2010	484 m (1,588 ft)	468.8 m (1,538 ft)									
9	Wuhan Greenland Center	武汉绿地中心		Wuhan	476 m (1,562 ft)	101	2023	476 m (1,562 ft)	467 m (1,532 ft)									
10	International Land-Sea Center	陆海国际中心		Chongqing	458.2 m (1,503 ft)	98	2026	458.2 m (1,503 ft)	429.6 m (1,409 ft)									
11	Changsha IFS Tower T1	长沙国际金融中心1		Changsha	452.1 m (1,483 ft)	94	2018	452.1 m (1,483 ft)	431 m (1,414 ft)									
12 =	Suzhou IFS	苏州国际金融中心		Suzhou	450 m (1,476 ft)	95	2019	450 m (1,476 ft)	399.1 m (1,309 ft)									
12 =	Zifeng Tower	紫峰大厦		Nanjing	450 m (1,476 ft)	89	2010	450 m (1,476 ft)	316.6 m (1,039 ft)									
14	Wuhan Center Tower	武汉中心		Wuhan	443.1 m (1,454 ft)	88	2019	443.1 m (1,454 ft)	399.2 m (1,310 ft)									
15	KK100	京基100		Shenzhen	441.8 m (1,449 ft)	98	2011	441.8 m (1,449 ft)	427.1 m (1,401 ft)									
16	Guangzhou International Finance Center	广州国际金融中心		Guangzhou	438.6 m (1,439 ft)	101	2010	438.6 m (1,439 ft)	415.1 m (1,362 ft)									
17	Greenland Shandong International Financial Center	山东国际金融中心		Jinan	428 m (1,404 ft)	88	2026	428 m (1,404 ft)	417.6 m (1,370 ft)									
18	Dongguan International Trade Center 1	东莞国际贸易中心1		Dongguan	422.6 m (1,386 ft)	85	2021	422.6 m (1,386 ft)	384.8 m (1,262 ft)									
19	Jin Mao Tower	金茂大厦		Shanghai	420.5 m (1,380 ft)	88	1999	420.5 m (1,380 ft)	348.4 m (1,143 ft)									
20	Zijin Financial Building	南京金融城二期C座1号地块		Nanjing	416.6 m (1,367 ft)	88	2025	416.6 m (1,367 ft)	412.2 m (1,352 ft)									
21	Two International Finance Centre	國際金融中心二期		Hong Kong	412 m (1,352 ft)	88	2003	412 m (1,352 ft)	387.6 m (1,272 ft)									
22	Ningbo Central Plaza Tower 1	宁波中心广场1号楼		Ningbo	409 m (1,342 ft)	80	2025	409 m (1,342 ft)	399 m (1,309 ft)									
23	Guangxi China Resources Tower	广西华润大厦		Nanning	402.7 m (1,321 ft)	86	2020	402.7 m (1,321 ft)	374.3 m (1,228 ft)									
24	Guiyang International Financial Center Tower 1	贵阳国际金融中心1		Guiyang	401 m (1,316 ft)	79	2020	401 m (1,316 ft)	368.1 m (1,208 ft)									
25	China Merchants Bank Headquarters Tower 1	招商銀行總部大樓1號		Shenzhen	393 m (1,289 ft)	77	2025	393 m (1,289 ft)	389.2 m (1,277 ft)									
26	China Resources Headquarters	华润总部大厦		Shenzhen	392.5 m (1,288 ft)	68	2018	392.5 m (1,288 ft)	345 m (1,132 ft)									
27	CITIC Plaza	中信广场		Guangzhou	390.2 m (1,280 ft)	80	1996	390.2 m (1,280 ft)	296.9 m (974 ft)									
28	Citymark Center	城脉中心		Shenzhen	388.3 m (1,274 ft)	70	2022	388.3 m (1,274 ft)	361.7 m (1,187 ft)									
29	Shum Yip Upperhills Tower 1	深业上城大厦 1		Shenzhen	388.1 m (1,273 ft)	80	2020	388.1 m (1,273 ft)	379.1 m (1,244 ft)									
30	Shun Hing Square	信兴广场		Shenzhen	384 m (1,260 ft)	69	1996	384 m (1,260 ft)	298 m (978 ft)									
31	Dalian Eton Center	大连裕景中心		Dalian	383.2 m (1,257 ft)	80	2016	383.2 m (1,257 ft)	339.8 m (1,115 ft)									
32	Logan Century Center 1	龙光世纪中心1		Nanning	381.3 m (1,251 ft)	82	2018	390 m (1,280 ft)	364.2 m (1,195 ft)									
33	1 Corporate Avenue	企业天地1号		Wuhan	376 m (1,234 ft)	73	2021	376 m (1,234 ft)	330.3 m (1,084 ft)									
34	Dabaihui Plaza	大百汇广场		Shenzhen	375.6 m (1,232 ft)	70	2021	375.6 m (1,232 ft)	306.9 m (1,007 ft)									
35	Guangdong Business Center	广东商务中心		Guangzhou	375.5 m (1,232 ft)	60	2025	375.5 m (1,232 ft)	339.8 m (1,115 ft)									
36	Central Plaza	中環廣場		Hong Kong	373.9 m (1,227 ft)	78	1992	373.9 m (1,227 ft)	299 m (981 ft)									
37	Hengfeng Guiyang Center Tower 1	恆豐貴陽中心1號樓		Guiyang	373.5 m (1,225 ft)	77	2026	373.5 m (1,225 ft)	344.6 m (1,131 ft)									
38	Dalian International Trade Center	大连国际贸易中心		Dalian	370.2 m (1,215 ft)	86	2019	370.2 m (1,215 ft)	359.5 m (1,179 ft)									
39	Shanghai International Trade Center Tower 2	上海国际贸易中心2号楼		Shanghai	370 m (1,214 ft)	70	2025	370 m (1,214 ft)	337.4 m (1,107 ft)									
40	Haitian Center Tower 2	海天中心2		Qingdao	368.9 m (1,210 ft)	73	2021	368.9 m (1,210 ft)	342.9 m (1,125 ft)									
41	Golden Eagle Tiandi Tower A	金鹰世界A		Nanjing	368.1 m (1,208 ft)	77	2020	368.1 m (1,208 ft)	336 m (1,102 ft)									
42	Bank of China Tower	中銀大廈		Hong Kong	367.4 m (1,205 ft)	76	1990	367.4 m (1,205 ft)	288.3 m (946 ft)									
43	Ping An Finance Center Tower 1	平安金融中心1号楼		Jinan	360 m (1,181 ft)	63	2023	360 m (1,181 ft)	337.6 m (1,108 ft)									
44	Huiyun Center	汇云中心		Shenzhen	359.2 m (1,178 ft)	80	2023	359.2 m (1,178 ft)	355.6 m (1,167 ft)									
45	Hanking Center	汉京中心		Shenzhen	358.9 m (1,177 ft)	65	2018	358.9 m (1,177 ft)	320 m (1,050 ft)									
46	Greenland Group Suzhou Center	绿地集团苏州中心		Suzhou	358 m (1,175 ft)	77	2026	358 m (1,175 ft)	350 m (1,148 ft)									
47	Galaxy World Tower 1	星系世界塔		Shenzhen	356 m (1,168 ft)	71	2023	356 m (1,168 ft)	347 m (1,138 ft)									
35	Galaxy World Tower 2	星系世界塔		Shenzhen	356 m (1,168 ft)	71	2023	356 m (1,168 ft)	347 m (1,138 ft)									
48 =	Raffles City Chongqing T3N	重庆来福士广场T3N		Chongqing	354.5 m (1,163 ft)	79	2019	354.5 m (1,163 ft)	339.5 m (1,114 ft)									
48 =	Raffles City Chongqing T4N	重庆来福士广场T4N		Chongqing	354.5 m (1,163 ft)	74	2019	354.5 m (1,163 ft)	338.9 m (1,112 ft)									
50	Forum 66 Tower 1	市府恒隆广场1		Shenyang	350.6 m (1,150 ft)	68	2015	350.6 m (1,150 ft)	294 m (965 ft)									
51	The Pinnacle	广晟国际大厦		Guangzhou	350.3 m (1,149 ft)	66	2011	350.3 m (1,149 ft)	264.2 m (867 ft)									
52	Xi'an Glory International Financial Center	西安国瑞国际金融中心		Xi'an	350 m (1,148 ft)	75	2022	350 m (1,148 ft)										
53	Spring City 66	昆明恒隆广场		Kunming	349 m (1,145 ft)	61	2019	349 m (1,145 ft)	285.7 m (937 ft)									
54	The Center	中環中心		Hong Kong	346 m (1,135 ft)	79	1998	346 m (1,135 ft)	275 m (902 ft)									
55	Xiamen International Centre	厦门国际中心		Xiamen	343.9 m (1,128 ft)	68	2025	343.9 m (1,128 ft)	322.8 m (1,059 ft)									
56	Changsha Shimao World Financial Center	长沙世茂环球金融中心		Changsha	343 m (1,125 ft)	74	2019	343 m (1,125 ft)	324 m (1,063 ft)									
57	One Shenzhen Bay Tower 7	深圳湾一号		Shenzhen	341.4 m (1,120 ft)	71	2018	341.4 m (1,120 ft)	319.7 m (1,049 ft)									
58 =	Jinan Center Financial City A5-3	济南中心金融城A5-3		Jinan	339 m (1,112 ft)	69	2020	339 m (1,112 ft)	315.5 m (1,035 ft)									
58 =	Wuxi IFS	无锡国际金融中心		Wuxi	339 m (1,112 ft)	68	2014	339 m (1,112 ft)	304 m (997 ft)									
58 =	Junkang Center	君康中心		Wenzhou	339 m (1,112 ft)	71	2024	339 m (1,112 ft)	308.3 m (1,011 ft)									
61	Chongqing World Financial Center	重庆环球金融中心		Chongqing	338.9 m (1,112 ft)	72	2015	338.9 m (1,112 ft)	306.1 m (1,004 ft)									
62 =	Suning Plaza, Zhenjiang	镇江苏宁广场		Zhenjiang	338 m (1,109 ft)	75	2018	338 m (1,109 ft)	301.8 m (990 ft)									
62 =	Tianjin Modern City Office Tower	天津国际金融中心		Tianjin	338 m (1,109 ft)	65	2016	338 m (1,109 ft)										
64	Hengqin International Finance Center	横琴国际金融中心		Zhuhai	337.7 m (1,108 ft)	69	2020	337.7 m (1,108 ft)	296.5 m (973 ft)									
65	Tianjin World Financial Center	津塔		Tianjin	336.9 m (1,105 ft)	75	2011	336.9 m (1,105 ft)	313.6 m (1,029 ft)									
66 =	Twin Towers Guiyang, East Tower	花果园双子塔1塔		Guiyang	335 m (1,099 ft)	74	2020	335 m (1,099 ft)	329.4 m (1,081 ft)									
66 =	Twin Towers Guiyang, West Tower	花果园双子塔2塔		Guiyang	335 m (1,099 ft)	74	2020	335 m (1,099 ft)	329.4 m (1,081 ft)									
68	Shengjing Finance Plaza T2	盛京金融廣場T2		Shenyang	334.3 m (1,097 ft)	68	2026	334.3 m (1,097 ft)	313.2 m (1,028 ft)									
69	Shimao International Plaza	上海世茂国际广场		Shanghai	333.3 m (1,094 ft)	69	2006	333.3 m (1,094 ft)	246 m (807 ft)									
70 =	Shenzhen Urban Construction & Tower	深圳城建大厦		Shenzhen	333 m (1,093 ft)	72	2024	333 m (1,093 ft)	313 m (1,027 ft)									
70 =	Modern Media Center	现代传煤中心		Changzhou	333 m (1,093 ft)	58	2013	333 m (1,093 ft)	225.1 m (739 ft)									
72	Minsheng Bank Building	民生银行大厦/武汉国际证券大厦		Wuhan	331 m (1,086 ft)	71	2008	331 m (1,086 ft)	237.4 m (779 ft)									
73 =	China World Trade Center Tower III	国际贸易中心3期		Beijing	330 m (1,083 ft)	74	2009	330 m (1,083 ft)	311.8 m (1,023 ft)									
73 =	Yuexiu Global Financial Center	越秀環球金融中心		Wuhan	330 m (1,083 ft)	68	2025	330 m (1,083 ft)	305.2 m (1,001 ft)									
73 =	Guangxi Financial Investment Center	广西金融投资中心		Nanning	330 m (1,083 ft)	70	2021	330 m (1,083 ft)										
73 =	Golden Corridor 22-1 Project Tower 1	金廊22-1項目1號塔		Shenyang	330 m (1,083 ft)	71	2026	330 m (1,083 ft)	316.7 m (1,039 ft)									
73 =	Jiulong Lake Knowledge Tower	九龍湖知識塔		Guangzhou	330 m (1,083 ft)	53	2026	330 m (1,083 ft)	301.8 m (990 ft)									
73 =	Wuhan Yangtze River Shipping Center	武汉长江航运大厦1号		Wuhan	330 m (1,083 ft)	65	2023	330 m (1,083 ft)	296.7 m (973 ft)									
73 =	Yuexiu Fortune Center Tower 1	武汉越秀财富中心		Wuhan	330 m (1,083 ft)	68	2017	330 m (1,083 ft)	304.5 m (999 ft)									
80	Hon Kwok City Center	汉国城市商业中心		Shenzhen	329.4 m (1,081 ft)	80	2017	329.4 m (1,081 ft)	302.2 m (991 ft)									
81	Zhuhai Tower	珠海中心大厦		Zhuhai	328.8 m (1,079 ft)	67	2017	328.8 m (1,079 ft)	308.8 m (1,013 ft)									
82	Qingdao Landmark Tower 1	青島亮馬河大廈1號大樓		Qingdao	328.6 m (1,078 ft)	71	2026	328.6 m (1,078 ft)	294.8 m (967 ft)									
83 =	Hanging Village of Huaxi	空中华西村		Wuxi	328 m (1,076 ft)	72	2011	328 m (1,076 ft)	315 m (1,033 ft)									
83 =	Baoneng Shenyang Global Financial Center Tower 2	沈阳宝能环球金融中心2		Shenyang	328 m (1,076 ft)	80	2027	328 m (1,076 ft)										
83 =	Suning Plaza, Wuxi	无锡苏宁广场		Wuxi	328 m (1,076 ft)	67	2014	328 m (1,076 ft)	284.4 m (933 ft)									
83 =	Golden Eagle Tiandi Tower B	金鹰世界B		Nanjing	328 m (1,076 ft)	60	2019	328 m (1,076 ft)	289 m (948 ft)									
87	Baoneng Center	宝能中心		Shenzhen	327.3 m (1,074 ft)	65	2018	327.3 m (1,074 ft)	296.4 m (972 ft)									
88 =	Huaqiang Golden Corridor City Plaza Main Tower	华强金廊城市广场主塔		Shenyang	327 m (1,073 ft)	66	2023	327 m (1,073 ft)										
88 =	Xiangjiang Fortune Finance Center Tower 1	湘江财富金融中心1		Changsha	327 m (1,073 ft)	65	2020	327 m (1,073 ft)										
90	Nanjing World Trade Center Tower 1	南京环球贸易中心		Nanjing	326.5 m (1,071 ft)	68	2022	326.5 m (1,071 ft)										
91	CITIC Pacific Plaza	中信泰富廣場		Jinan	326 m (1,070 ft)	64	2026	326 m (1,070 ft)	310.2 m (1,018 ft)									
92	Deji Plaza Phase 2	德基广场二期		Nanjing	324 m (1,063 ft)	70	2013	324 m (1,063 ft)	294 m (965 ft)									
93	Yantai Shimao No.1 The Harbour	烟台世茂海湾一号		Yantai	323 m (1,060 ft)	59	2017	323 m (1,060 ft)	237.8 m (780 ft)									
94	Wenzhou World Trade Center	温州世贸中心大厦		Wenzhou	321.9 m (1,056 ft)	68	2011	321.9 m (1,056 ft)	244 m (801 ft)									
95	Guangxi Finance Plaza	广西金融广场		Nanning	321 m (1,053 ft)	68	2017	321 m (1,053 ft)	294.6 m (967 ft)									
95 =	Heartland 66 Office Tower	武汉恒隆广场		Wuhan	320.9 m (1,053 ft)	61	2020	320.9 m (1,053 ft)										
97	Nina Tower	如心廣場		Hong Kong	320.4 m (1,051 ft)	80	2007	320.4 m (1,051 ft)	301.1 m (988 ft)									
98 =	Huijin Center 1	汇金中心1		Guangzhou	320 m (1,050 ft)	69	2022	320 m (1,050 ft)										
98 =	Junchao Plaza	君超广场		Guangzhou	320 m (1,050 ft)	67	2025	320 m (1,050 ft)	304.8 m (1,000 ft)									
98 =	Science Gate Tower 1	科学门1号塔		Shanghai	320 m (1,050 ft)	60	2024	320 m (1,050 ft)	290.9 m (954 ft)									
98 =	Science Gate Tower 2	科学门2号楼		Shanghai	320 m (1,050 ft)	60	2024	320 m (1,050 ft)	290.9 m (954 ft)									
98 =	Guangzhou International Cultural Center	廣州國際文化中心		Guangzhou	320 m (1,050 ft)	56	2026	320 m (1,050 ft)	296.4 m (972 ft)									
98 =	Sinar Mas Center 1	金光中心 1		Shanghai	320 m (1,050 ft)	65	2017	320 m (1,050 ft)										
104	Global City Plaza	环球都会广场		Guangzhou	318.9 m (1,046 ft)	67	2016	318.9 m (1,046 ft)										
105	China Resources Metropolitan City Center Landmark Tower	華潤都市中心置地廣場大廈		Wenzhou	318.2 m (1,044 ft)	60	2025	318.2 m (1,044 ft)	302.3 m (992 ft)									
106	Meixi Lake Changsha Jinmao Building	梅溪湖 长沙金茂大厦		Changsha	318.1 m (1,044 ft)	62	2024	318.1 m (1,044 ft)	290.5 m (953 ft)									
107	Jiuzhou International Tower	九州国际大厦		Nanning	318 m (1,043 ft)	71	2017	318 m (1,043 ft)										
108 =	Kunming Xishan Wanda Plaza North	西山万达广场北塔		Kunming	317.8 m (1,043 ft)	67	2016	317.8 m (1,043 ft)										
108 =	Kunming Xishan Wanda Plaza South	西山万达广场南塔		Kunming	317.8 m (1,043 ft)	66	2016	317.8 m (1,043 ft)										
110	Hong Plaza Main Tower	宏廣場主樓		Jinan	317 m (1,040 ft)	62	2026	317 m (1,040 ft)	292.8 m (961 ft)									
111	Chongqing IFS T1	重庆国际金融中心		Chongqing	316.3 m (1,038 ft)	63	2016	316.3 m (1,038 ft)	296.3 m (972 ft)									
112	International Youth Cultural Center Tower 1	南京国际青年文化中心		Nanjing	315 m (1,033 ft)	71	2015	315 m (1,033 ft)	270 m (886 ft)									
113	Honglou Times Square	红楼时代广场		Lanzhou	313 m (1,027 ft)	56	2018	313 m (1,027 ft)	246.2 m (808 ft)									
114	TEDA IFC 1	泰達國金中心1號大樓		Tianjin	313 m (1,027 ft)	68	2026	313 m (1,027 ft)	290.9 m (954 ft)									
115	Shenzhen Bay Innovation and Technology Centre Tower 1	深湾创新科技中心1		Shenzhen	311.1 m (1,021 ft)	69	2020	311.1 m (1,021 ft)	294.9 m (968 ft)									
116 =	Moi Center	瀋陽茂業中心		Shenyang	311 m (1,020 ft)	75	2014	311 m (1,020 ft)	270 m (886 ft)									
116 =	Poly Pazhou C2	保利发展广场		Guangzhou	311 m (1,020 ft)	65	2017	311 m (1,020 ft)	296 m (971 ft)									
118	Guangxi Wealth Financial Center	富雅国际金融中心		Nanning	310.8 m (1,020 ft)	70	2019	310.8 m (1,020 ft)										
119 =	Hengyu Jinrong Center Block A	恆裕錦榮中心A座		Shenzhen	310 m (1,017 ft)	66	2026	310 m (1,017 ft)	298.6 m (980 ft)									
119 =	Greenland Hangzhou Center	杭州世纪中心		Hangzhou	310 m (1,017 ft)	67	2023	310 m (1,017 ft)										
121	CCCC Southern Financial Investment Building	中交汇通横琴广场		Zhuhai	309.5 m (1,015 ft)	65	2021	309.5 m (1,015 ft)										
122 =	Pearl River Tower	珠江城大厦		Guangzhou	309.4 m (1,015 ft)	71	2013	309.4 m (1,015 ft)	289.9 m (951 ft)									
122 =	Fortune Center	越秀金融大厦		Guangzhou	309.4 m (1,015 ft)	68	2015	309.4 m (1,015 ft)	292 m (958 ft)									
124 =	Changsha IFS Tower 2	长沙国际金融中心副楼		Changsha	308 m (1,010 ft)	63	2018	308 m (1,010 ft)										
124 =	Guangfa Securities Headquarters	广发证券大厦		Guangzhou	308 m (1,010 ft)	58	2018	308 m (1,010 ft)	273.3 m (897 ft)									
126	Nanshan Science and Technology Union Building	南山科技聯盟大廈		Shenzhen	307.2 m (1,008 ft)	67	2026	307.2 m (1,008 ft)	282.4 m (927 ft)									
127	Zhongtian Future Ark Global Valley Tower 5	中天未來方舟全球谷5號樓		Guiyang	306.4 m (1,005 ft)	62	2026	306.4 m (1,005 ft)	290.2 m (952 ft)									
128	East Pacific Center Tower A	东海商务广场A座		Shenzhen	306 m (1,004 ft)	85	2013	306 m (1,004 ft)	278 m (912 ft)									
129	Zhongshan International Trade Center	中山国际贸易中心		Zhongshan	305 m (1,001 ft)	65	2019	305 m (1,001 ft)	305 m (1,001 ft)									
130	Chang Fu Jin Mao Tower	长富金茂大厦		Shenzhen	304.3 m (998 ft)	68	2015	304.3 m (998 ft)	271 m (889 ft)									
131	Greenland Hangzhou Center South Tower	杭州世纪中心		Hangzhou	304 m (997 ft)	64	2023	304 m (997 ft)	304 m (997 ft)									
132	Maoye City – Marriott Hotel	无锡茂业中心		Wuxi	303.8 m (997 ft)	68	2014	303.8 m (997 ft)	267 m (876 ft)									
133 =	Suzhou ICC	苏州环贸中心		Suzhou	303.2 m (995 ft)	68	2025	301.8 m (990 ft)										
133 =	Guangdong Landmark Building	广东地标大厦		Shenzhen	303.2 m (995 ft)	62	2023	303.2 m (995 ft)	300.9 m (987 ft)									
135	Greenland Hangzhou Center North Tower	杭州世纪中心		Hangzhou	303 m (994 ft)	64	2023	303 m (994 ft)	303 m (994 ft)									
136 =	Diwang International Fortune Center	柳州地王国际财富中心		Liuzhou	303 m (994 ft)	72	2015	303 m (994 ft)	289.9 m (951 ft)									
136 =	Greenland Puli Center	绿地普利中心		Jinan	303 m (994 ft)	63	2015	303 m (994 ft)	244.2 m (801 ft)									
136 =	Jiangxi Greenland Central Plaza 1	南昌綠地中央广场1		Nanchang	303 m (994 ft)	59	2015	303 m (994 ft)	245 m (804 ft)									
136 =	Jiangxi Greenland Central Plaza 2	南昌綠地中央广场2		Nanchang	303 m (994 ft)	59	2015	303 m (994 ft)	245 m (804 ft)									
140	Leatop Plaza	利通广场		Guangzhou	302.7 m (993 ft)	64	2012	302.7 m (993 ft)	264.7 m (868 ft)									
141	Gate to the East	东方之门		Suzhou	301.8 m (990 ft)	74	2015	301.8 m (990 ft)	261.1 m (857 ft)									
142	Chongqing International Commerce Financial Centre T1	重庆国际贸易中心1		Chongqing	301.2 m (988 ft)	65	2022	301.2 m (988 ft)										
143	Zhongzhou Holdings Financial Center	中洲控股中心		Shenzhen	300.8 m (987 ft)	61	2015	300.8 m (987 ft)	260.7 m (855 ft)									
144 =	Huachuang International Plaza	华创国际广场		Changsha	300 m (984 ft)	66	2017	300 m (984 ft)										
144 =	Greenland Bund Centre Tower 1	绿地外滩中心1号楼		Shanghai	300 m (984 ft)	64	2025	300 m (984 ft)										
144 =	OCT Tower	华侨城大厦		Shenzhen	300 m (984 ft)	60	2020	300 m (984 ft)	269.9 m (885 ft)									
144 =	Jiefangbei Book City	解放碑書城		Chongqing	300 m (984 ft)	63	2025	300 m (984 ft)	291.8 m (957 ft)									
144 =	Golden Eagle Tiandi Tower C	金鹰世界C		Nanjing	300 m (984 ft)	58	2019	300 m (984 ft)	264.6 m (868 ft)									
144 =	Yangzhou Keyne Center	揚州金恩中心		Yangzhou	300 m (984 ft)	60	2026	300 m (984 ft)	291.5 m (956 ft)									
144 =	Shimao Cross-Strait PlazaA	世茂海峡大厦A		Xiamen	300 m (984 ft)	64	2015	300 m (984 ft)	270.25 m (887 ft)									
144 =	Shimao Cross-Strait PlazaB	世茂海峡大厦B		Xiamen	300 m (984 ft)	55	2015	300 m (984 ft)	270.25 m (887 ft)									
152	Xinchu Qingtian Plaza Tower 1	新楚擎天广场一号楼		Changsha	299.9 m (984 ft)	57	2024	299.9 m (984 ft)										
153	Jin Wan Plaza 9	津湾广场		Tianjin	299.7 m (983 ft)	57	2018	299.7 m (983 ft)										
154	Shum Yip Upperhills Tower 2	深业上城T2		Shenzhen	299.3 m (982 ft)	62	2017	299.3 m (982 ft)										
154	Taizhou Tiansheng Center	深业上城T2		Taizhou, Zhejiang	299 m (981 ft)	66	2026	299 m (981 ft)										
154	Yujiapu Yinglan International Finance Cebter	于家堡盈蓝国际金融中心		Tianjin	299 m (981 ft)	63	2026	299 m (981 ft)										
157	China Resources Qianhai Center Tower 1	华润前海中心1号楼		Shenzhen	298.5 m (979 ft)	64	2017	298.5 m (979 ft)		157 =	Huaxun Center	华讯大厦	Shenzhen	286 m (938 ft)	70	2018	286 m (938 ft)	286 m (938 ft)
157 =	Shenglong Global Center	升龙环球中心		Fuzhou	280 m (919 ft)	57	2019	280 m (919 ft)	249.565 m (819 ft)									
157 =	Hangzhou Wangchao Center	望朝中心		Hangzhou	280 m (919 ft)	54	2023	280 m (919 ft)	280 m (919 ft)									

== Under construction, on-hold and proposed ==
=== Under construction ===
This list ranks buildings under construction in China that plan to stand at least 300 metres (980 ft) tall.

Indicates buildings that have been structurally topped out

Name	City	Height	Floors	Year (est.)
Goldin Finance 117	Tianjin	597 m (1,959 ft)	117	2027
Greenland Jinmao International Finance Center	Nanjing	499.8 m (1,640 ft)	102	2028
Hexi Yuzui Tower A	Nanjing	498.9 m (1,637 ft)	85	2028
Tianfu Center	Chengdu	488.9 m (1,604 ft)	95	2027
North Bund Centre	Shanghai	480 m (1,570 ft)	99	2030
Wuhan CTF Finance Center	Wuhan	475 m (1,558 ft)	84	2029
Chengdu Greenland Tower	Chengdu	468 m (1,535 ft)	101	2026
Suzhou CSC Fortune Center	Suzhou	460 m (1,510 ft)	100	2028
China Resources Land Center	Dongguan	450 m (1,480 ft)	98	2028
Hainan Center Tower 1	Haikou	428 m (1,404 ft)	94	2027
Tsingshan Holdings Group Global Headquarters Tower 1	Wenzhou	418 m (1,371 ft)		
Shenzhen Luohu Friendship Trading Centre	Shenzhen	407 m (1,335 ft)	83	2026
Baoneng Binhu Center T2	Hefei	404 m (1,325 ft)		2028
Great River Center	Wuhan	400 m (1,300 ft)	82	2026
Shenzhen Bay Super Headquarters Base Tower C-1	Shenzhen	400 m (1,300 ft)	78	2027
Hangzhou West Railway Station Hub Tower 1	Hangzhou	399.8 m (1,312 ft)	83	
China Merchants Group West Headquarters	Chengdu	396 m (1,299 ft)	82	2028
Shenzhen Bay Super Headquarters Base Tower B	Shenzhen	394 m (1,293 ft)	81	2028
Lucheng Square	Wenzhou	388.8 m (1,276 ft)	79	2028
Baoneng Shenyang Global Financial Center	Shenyang	388 m (1,273 ft)	75	2027
Guohua Financial Center Tower 1	Wuhan	388 m (1,273 ft)	67	2029
China Merchants Prince Bay Tower	Shenzhen	374 m (1,227 ft)	59	2028
Bay Area Smart Plaza Tower A	Shenzhen	358.1 m (1,175 ft)	65	2027
Guohong Center	Wenzhou	356 m (1,168 ft)	71	2028
Zhonghai City Plaza	Tianjin	339.9 m (1,115 ft)	75	2026
Shimao-Hong Kong International Centre Tower 2	Shenzhen	338 m (1,109 ft)	68	
Shenzhen Bay Super Headquarters Base Tower C-2	Shenzhen	336 m (1,102 ft)	63	2027
Tianjin Kerry Center	Tianjin	333 m (1,093 ft)	72	2027
Guangjian Financial Center	Guangzhou	333 m (1,093 ft)		2027
Jiangbei New Financial Center Phase I	Nanjing	320 m (1,050 ft)	63	2027
Goldfinger Tower A	Hangzhou	320 m (1,050 ft)	61	2026
Qiya International Center	Chengdu	320 m (1,050 ft)		
Taihu Lake Main Landmark Tower	Huzhou	318 m (1,043 ft)	66	2026
CITIC Financial Center Tower 1	Shenzhen	312 m (1,024 ft)	62	2026
Goldfinger Tower B	Hangzhou	300 m (980 ft)	68	2026
Hangzhou West Railway Station Hub Tower 7	Hangzhou	300 m (980 ft)	62	

=== On hold ===
This list ranks buildings on hold in China that plan to stand at least 300 metres (980 ft) tall.

Name	City	Height	Floors	Year (est.)
Evergrande Hefei Center T1	Hefei	518 m (1,699 ft)	112	2028
Dalian Greenland Center	Dalian	518 m (1,699 ft)	88	2030
Xiangmi Lake New Financial Center Tower 1	Shenzhen	500 m (1,600 ft)	109	2026
Suzhou Zhonghan Center	Suzhou	499.2 m (1,638 ft)	103	2028
China International Silk Road Center	Xi'an	498 m (1,634 ft)	101	2027
Rizhao Center	Rizhao	485 m (1,591 ft)	94	2028
Chushang Building	Wuhan	475 m (1,558 ft)	111	2025
Fosun Bund Center T1	Wuhan	470 m (1,540 ft)		
R&F Guangdong Building	Tianjin	468 m (1,535 ft)	91	2026
Evergrande City Light	Ningbo	453.5 m (1,488 ft)	88	
Tianshan Gate of the World	Shijiazhuang	450 m (1,480 ft)	106	2030
Greenland Center Tower 1	Kunming	428 m (1,404 ft)		
Nanjing Olympic Suning Tower	Nanjing	419.8 m (1,377 ft)	99	
Dongfeng Plaza Landmark Tower	Kunming	407 m (1,335 ft)	100	2027
Haiyun Plaza	Rizhao	390 m (1,280 ft)	86	2026
Forum 66 Tower 2	Shenyang	384 m (1,260 ft)	76	2027
Guiyang World Trade Center Landmark Tower	Guiyang	380 m (1,250 ft)	92	
Greenland Star City Light Tower	Changsha	379.9 m (1,246 ft)	83	2027
Nanchang Ping An Financial Center	Nanchang	373 m (1,224 ft)	72	2026
Xiangmi Lake New Financial Center Tower 2	Shenzhen	370 m (1,210 ft)	81	2026
Xiangmi Lake New Financial Center Tower 3	Shenzhen	370 m (1,210 ft)	80	2026
Kweichow Moutai Tower	Guiyang	369 m (1,211 ft)		
Hengli Global Operations Headquarters Tower 1	Suzhou	369 m (1,211 ft)		2027
Wanda One	Xi'an	360 m (1,180 ft)	86	2028
Sino Steel Tower	Tianjin	358 m (1,175 ft)	83	
Fosun Bund Center T2	Wuhan	356 m (1,168 ft)		
Guowei ZY Plaza	Zhuhai	355 m (1,165 ft)	75	2026
Baolixian Village Old Reform Project Main Building	Guangzhou	350 m (1,150 ft)	70	2028
Agricultural Development Center Tower 1	Harbin	350 m (1,150 ft)		2027
Global Port Tower 1	Lanzhou	350 m (1,150 ft)		
Global Port Tower 2	Lanzhou	350 m (1,150 ft)		
SUNAC A-ONE Tower 4	Chongqing	348.9 m (1,145 ft)	89	2026
Skyfame Center Landmark Tower	Nanning	346 m (1,135 ft)	72	2026
Wanling Global Center	Zhuhai	337 m (1,106 ft)	70	2027
Yuetai Zhuxi Financial Center	Jiangmen	336 m (1,102 ft)	71	
Poly 335 Financial Center Tower 1	Guangzhou	335.2 m (1,100 ft)	64	
Mandarin Oriental Hotel Tower A	Chengdu	333.1 m (1,093 ft)	73	2026
Jiujiang IFC	Jiujiang	333 m (1,093 ft)	66	2026
Huaguoyuan Zone D	Guiyang	330 m (1,080 ft)	74	
Huaguoyuan Zone N	Guiyang	330 m (1,080 ft)	74	
Jinqiao Sub-Center Block C1 Tower 1	Shanghai	330 m (1,080 ft)		
Global Financial Centre Tower 2	Shenyang	328 m (1,076 ft)	80	
Dongfeng Plaza Tower 2	Kunming	326 m (1,070 ft)	72	2026
Suhewan Huaxing New City Tower 1	Shanghai	320 m (1,050 ft)		2028
Evergrande International Center A	Nanning	320 m (1,050 ft)	68	
Foshan Shuntie Holdings Tower	Foshan	318 m (1,043 ft)	60	2028
Jiuzhou Bay Tower	Zhuhai	318.5 m (1,045 ft)	64	
China South City Tower 1	Nanning	318 m (1,043 ft)	68	
Shaoxing Longemont Tower	Shaoxing	318 m (1,043 ft)	71	
Yurun International Tower	Huaiyin	317 m (1,040 ft)	75	
Zhongtian Future Ark City Window Office Tower	Guiyang	314 m (1,030 ft)	58	
Chengdu Poly International Plaza	Chengdu	309 m (1,014 ft)	56	
Xiangmi Lake Financial Tower	Shenzhen	308 m (1,010 ft)	80	2026
Nanjing International Center 3	Nanjing	306 m (1,004 ft)	66	2026
Wuhan Yangtze River Center Tower 2	Wuhan	305 m (1,001 ft)	65	2025
Global Trade Center	Xi'an	303 m (994 ft)	63	
Greenland Center Tower 1	Xining	303 m (994 ft)		2025
SUNAC A-ONE Tower 2	Chongqing	302.1 m (991 ft)	72	2026
Shimao Pingshan Center	Shenzhen	302 m (991 ft)	62	
Greenland Center North Tower	Yinchuan	301 m (988 ft)	58	
Greenland Center South Tower	Yinchuan	301 m (988 ft)	58	
Shimao SIC Tower 1	Nanjing	300 m (980 ft)	64	2027
Hangzhou West Railway Station Hub Tower 2	Hangzhou	300 m (980 ft)	68	
Xiangmi Lake New Financial Center Tower 4	Shenzhen	300 m (980 ft)	64	2026
Shimao Riverside Block D2b	Wuhan	300 m (980 ft)	53	
Runhua Global Center 1	Changzhou	300 m (980 ft)	63	

=== Proposed ===
This list ranks proposed buildings in China that plan to stand at least 300 metres (980 ft) tall.

Name	City	Height	Floors	Year (est.)
Shenzhen 800 Landmark Tower	Shenzhen	830 m (2,720 ft)	175	2030
Caiwuwei Center	Shenzhen	760 m (2,490 ft)	169	2030
Shimao Shenzhen–Hong Kong International Centre	Shenzhen	700 m (2,300 ft)	148	2029
Shenzhen Tower	Shenzhen	608 m (1,995 ft)	130	2030
Baoneng Binhu Center Tower T1	Hefei	588 m (1,929 ft)	119	
Jinan IFC Landmark Tower	Jinan	518 m (1,699 ft)	135	2028
Fuyuan Zhongshan 108 IFC	Zhongshan	498 m (1,634 ft)	108	2029
International Innovation Center	Guangzhou	488 m (1,601 ft)	103	2030
Kunshan Centre	Suzhou	480 m (1,570 ft)		
Wuhan Pan Hai Times Center Landmark Tower	Wuhan	477 m (1,565 ft)	97	
SUNAC A-ONE Tower 1	Chongqing	470 m (1,540 ft)	101	2030
Guohua Financial Center Tower 1	Wuhan	465 m (1,526 ft)	79	
Agile Shenzhong One	Zhongshan	460 m (1,510 ft)		
Guizhou Culture Plaza Tower	Guiyang	450 m (1,480 ft)	97	2027
Wuhan World Trade Center	Wuhan	438 m (1,437 ft)	86	
Xiaobailou Union Plaza Tower 1	Tianjin	400 m (1,300 ft)	82	
Azure Coast Tower	Qingdao	400 m (1,300 ft)		
Greenland Optics Valley Center Landmark Tower	Wuhan	400 m (1,300 ft)		
Tianfu Center Headquarters Tower	Chengdu	396 m (1,299 ft)	82	
Fuhua Future World Main Tower	Changchun	395 m (1,296 ft)		
COFCO Landmark Tower	Tianjin	390 m (1,280 ft)	76	
Chongqing Centre T1	Chongqing	388 m (1,273 ft)		
Eton Shenyang Center A2	Shenyang	384.9 m (1,263 ft)	97	
Heart of the City	Zhuhai	384 m (1,260 ft)	81	
North Bund Tower 2	Shanghai	380 m (1,250 ft)		
Baoneng Binhu Center Tower T3	Hefei	380 m (1,250 ft)	78	2027
Shenglong Center	Luoyang	369 m (1,211 ft)	88	
Zhanjiang Center	Zhanjiang	368 m (1,207 ft)	68	
Z10 Plot	Beijing	368 m (1,207 ft)		
Zhanjiang Business Center	Zhanjiang	360 m (1,180 ft)	79	
Shimao Fuzhou Tower	Fuzhou	360 m (1,180 ft)		
Shimao Railway Station Tower 1	Wuxi	358 m (1,175 ft)		
Nanning Center East Tower	Nanning	357 m (1,171 ft)	77	
Nanning Center West Tower	Nanning	357 m (1,171 ft)	77	
Yuhe Shennan Tower	Shenzhen	354 m (1,161 ft)	67	
ASEAN Guangxi Mayors Tower	Nanning	353.4 m (1,159 ft)	80	
Dianchi Pearl Square Tower 1	Kunming	350 m (1,150 ft)		
HeXi Yuzui Tower C	Nanjing	350 m (1,150 ft)		
Nanjing Nexus Tower 1	Nanjing	350 m (1,150 ft)		
SUNAC Center Tower 1	Wuhan	343.5 m (1,127 ft)	60	
Golden Century Plaza	Linyi	348 m (1,142 ft)		
Eton Shenyang Center A1	Shenyang	342.9 m (1,125 ft)	86	
Huafa Economic Headquarters	Zhuhai	340 m (1,120 ft)	69	
Mindian Tower	Xiamen	339 m (1,112 ft)	76	
Culture Tower	Guangzhou	338 m (1,109 ft)		
Shimao Olympic Center	Qingdao	335 m (1,099 ft)	75	
Tongzhou Resort City-Landmark Tower 1	Beijing	333.3 m (1,094 ft)	80	
Taiyuan International Finance Center	Taiyuan	333 m (1,093 ft)	75	
Shijiazhuang International Convention & Exhibition Center	Shijiazhuang	330 m (1,080 ft)	82	
Hengqin International Business Centre	Zhuhai	330 m (1,080 ft)	60	
COFCO Tower	Shenzhen	328 m (1,076 ft)		
Chengdu E-Song Tower	Chengdu	320 m (1,050 ft)		
Xinda Kingtown International Center Tower 1	Suzhou	320 m (1,050 ft)	65	
Ankangyuan Tower 1	Shanghai	320 m (1,050 ft)		
Xiaoyaowan Greenland Center	Dalian	318 m (1,043 ft)		
The Rainbow Gate Tower 1	Beijing	316 m (1,037 ft)	68	
Walsin Centro 2	Nanjing	315 m (1,033 ft)	70	
Haiyue World	Wuhan	308 m (1,010 ft)	55	
Nanshan Business & Cultural Centre	Shenzhen	308 m (1,010 ft)		
Shimao Railway Station Tower 2	Wuxi	308 m (1,010 ft)		
Fanyue City Tower 1	Wuhan	308 m (1,010 ft)	63	
Taiyuan Guohai Plaza Tower 1	Taiyuan	307 m (1,007 ft)	67	
Baoneng International Trade Center	Zhengzhou	306 m (1,004 ft)	70	
Qiaokou Hang Lung Plaza Tower 1	Wuhan	306 m (1,004 ft)	62	
Urban Lighthouse	Nanjing	300 m (980 ft)	57	
Changsha Fuxing World Financial Center T2	Changsha	300 m (980 ft)		
Z8 Plot Tower	Beijing	300 m (980 ft)	68	
Binjiang B7 Project	Changsha	300 m (980 ft)		
Guangxi Nanning ASEAN Tower	Nanning	300 m (980 ft)	79	
Qianhai Prisma Residential Tower	Shenzhen	300 m (980 ft)		
Suning Ruicheng Phase 3	Nanjing	300 m (980 ft)	62	
Xintian Times Square	Zhengzhou	300 m (980 ft)		
Suzhou Keyne Center Office and Hotel	Suzhou	300 m (980 ft)	26	
North Bund Tower 3	Shanghai	300 m (980 ft)		
Powerlong Plaza	Zhongshan	300 m (980 ft)		2031
Greater Bay Area Technology Finance Innovation Center	Guangzhou	300 m (980 ft)		
New Hope Global Holding Headquarters	Chengdu	300 m (980 ft)		
Shimao Splendid Yangtze River International Financial Plaza	Wuhan	300 m (980 ft)	52	

== Timeline of tallest buildings ==
The following is a list of buildings that in the past held, or currently holds, the title of the tallest building in mainland China. This list includes high-rises and skyscrapers only, excluding pre-modern buildings such as the Liaodi Pagoda and TV or observation towers such as the Oriental Pearl Tower and the Canton Tower.

Name	Image	City	Height	Floors	Year(s) as tallest
Union Building		Shanghai	45.75 m (150.1 ft)	6	1916–1922
Nanfang Building		Guangzhou	50 m (160 ft)	12	1922–1927
Customs House		Shanghai	79.2 m (260 ft)	8	1927–1929
Peace Hotel		Shanghai	77 m (253 ft)	13	1929–1934
Broadway Mansions		Shanghai	78 m (256 ft)	19	1934–1934
Park Hotel		Shanghai	84 m (276 ft)	24	1934–1968
Guangzhou Hotel		Guangzhou	86.51 m (283.8 ft)	27	1968–1976
Baiyun Hotel		Guangzhou	93.5 m (307 ft)	34	1976–1981
Jinling Hotel		Nanjing	110 m (360 ft)	37	1981–1985
Guomao Building		Shenzhen	160 m (520 ft)	50	1985–1990
Jing Guang Center		Beijing	208 m (682 ft)	52	1990–1996
King Tower		Shanghai	212 m (696 ft)	38	1996–1996
Shun Hing Square		Shenzhen	384 m (1,260 ft)	69	1996–1996
CITIC Plaza		Guangzhou	390 m (1,280 ft)	80	1996–1999
Jin Mao Tower		Shanghai	421 m (1,381 ft)	88	1999–2008
Shanghai World Financial Center		Shanghai	492 m (1,614 ft)	101	2008–2015
Shanghai Tower		Shanghai	632 m (2,073 ft)	128	2015–present

== Cities with the most skyscrapers ==
This list ranks Chinese cities that have at least 10 completed buildings taller than 150 metres (490 ft).

	City	Province	≥500 m	≥400 m	≥300 m	≥200 m	≥150 m	Total
1	Hong Kong	HK SAR	–	2	6	102	569	679
2	Shenzhen	Guangdong	1	3	22	200	469	695
3	Guangzhou	Guangdong	1	2	14	69	211	297
4	Shanghai	Shanghai	1	3	9	75	205	293
5	Wuhan	Hubei	–	2	8	76	209	295
6	Chongqing	Chongqing	–	1	6	64	155	226
7	Chengdu	Sichuan	–	–	–	50	136	136
8	Shenyang	Liaoning	–	–	4	30	101	101
9	Hangzhou	Zhejiang	–	–	2	38	100	100
10	Nanning	Guangxi	–	1	6	37	94	94
11	Tianjin	Tianjin	1	1	3	34	79	79
12	Nanjing	Jiangsu	–	1	8	39	82	82
13	Beijing	Beijing	1	1	2	27	70	70
14	Changsha	Hunan	–	1	6	51	93	93
15	Dalian	Liaoning	–	–	2	30	59	59
16	Zhuhai	Guangdong	–	–	3	19	56	56
17	Hefei	Anhui	–	–	–	25	46	46
18	Suzhou	Jiangsu	–	1	2	19	44	44
19	Qingdao	Shandong	–	–	1	16	39	39
20	Jinan	Shandong	–	–	3	13	38	38
21	Foshan	Guangdong	–	–	–	13	36	36
22	Xiamen	Fujian	–	–	–	15	36	36
23	Nanchang	Jiangxi	–	–	2	20	35	35
24	Macau	Macau SAR	–	–	–	2	33	33
25	Guiyang	Guizhou	–	1	3	22	30	30
26	Kunming	Yunnan	–	–	3	16	30	30
27	Wuxi	Jiangsu	–	–	4	15	30	30
28	Ningbo	Zhejiang	–	–	–	6	30	30
29	Xi'an	Shaanxi	–	–	1	13	25	25
30	Liuzhou	Guangxi	–	–	1	8	24	24
31	Taiyuan	Shanxi	–	–	–	5	21	21
32	Zhengzhou	Henan	–	–	–	6	20	20
33	Dongguan	Guangdong	–	1	1	13	19	19
34	Lanzhou	Gansu	–	–	1	10	19	19
35	Fuzhou	Fujian	–	–	1	9	19	19
36	Haikou	Hainan	–	–	–	7	16	16
37	Shijiazhuang	Hebei	–	–	–	3	16	16
38	Changchun	Jilin	–	–	–	4	11	11
39	Zhanjiang	Guangdong	–	–	–	3	10	10

== Number of skyscrapers completed each year ==
The following table lists the number of buildings 150 metres (490 ft) and taller built in China between 2003 and 2015.

New buildings ≥150 m
Period	per period	per year
2003–2004	133	67
2005–2006	125	63
2007–2008	126	63
2009–2010	127	64
2011–2012	105	53
2013	83	83
2014	149	149
2015	138	138
Total	1112	

In recent years, China has been finishing more than 100 skyscrapers per year. More than 1000 skyscrapers were constructed just within the period 2000–2015.

The following table lists the number of buildings that are 200 metres (660 ft) (Note: The published data since 2016 considers 200 m or taller buildings, rather than the 150 m or taller from the previous table. Due to this, the number of completed buildings per year in this table is slightly smaller than in that previous one.) and taller built since 2016.

New buildings ≥200 m
Year	per year	Reference
2016	84	
2017	77	
2018	88	
2019	57	
2020	56	
2021	64	
2022	N/D	

== See also ==
- List of tallest buildings in China by city
- List of tallest buildings
- List of cities with the most skyscrapers

== Notes ==
A. Topped out, but still under construction
