= Hengqin Headquarters Tower 2 =

Building in Zhuhai, China

General information
- Status: Vision
- Location: Zhuhai, Guangdong, China
- Groundbreaking: 2012-2013
- Construction started: 2013
- Completed: ?

Height
- Architectural: 490 metres (1,607.6 ft)

Technical details
- Floor count: 106

Hengqin Headquarters Tower 2 is a skyscraper in Zhuhai, Guangdong, China. It is 490 metres (1,607.6 ft) tall and was built in 2013.

== See also ==
- List of tallest buildings in China
