= Greenland Center =

Greenland Center or Greenland Centre may refer to:

- Greenland Centre, Sydney, a residential skyscraper that is currently topped out in its construction phases
- Greenland Center, Xi'an, a supertall skyscraper under construction
- Katuaq, Greenland's Centre for the Performing Arts
- Wuhan Greenland Center, a supertall skyscraper under construction
- Zifeng Tower, a skyscraper previously known as the Nanjing Greenland Financial Center
