= Fortune Center =

Supertall skyscraper in Guangzhou, Guangdong, China

Coordinates: 23.1240°N 113.3262°E

- 越秀金融大厦
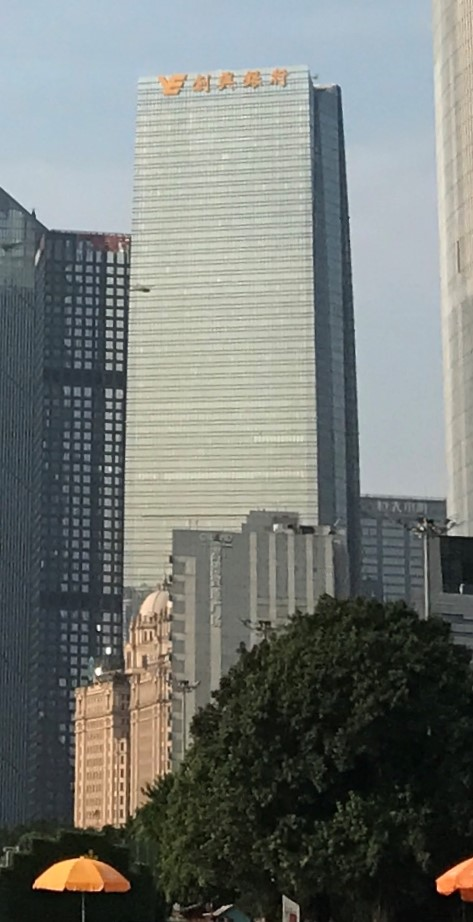
- The Fortune Center in September 2017
- Interactive map of the Fortune Center area
- Alternative names: Yuexiu Financial Tower, Pearl River New City B2-10 project

General information
- Status: Completed
- Location: Guangzhou, Guangdong, Zhujiang East Road, China
- Construction started: 2011
- Completed: 2015
- Owner: Yuexiu Property

Height
- Architectural: 309.4 m (1,015 ft)
- Tip: 309.4 m (1,015 ft)
- Roof: 309.0 m (1,013.8 ft)
- Top floor: 292 m (958 ft)

Technical details
- Floor count: 68 (+4 underground)
- Floor area: 210,477 m^{2} (2,265,560 sq ft)

Design and construction
- Architecture firm: Architectural Design and Research Institute, South China University of Technology
- Services engineer: Meinhardt Group

Fortune Center, also known as Yuexiu Financial Tower (Chinese: 越秀金融大厦; pinyin: Yuèxìu jīnróng dàshà), is a 68-storey, 309.4 m (1,015 ft) supertall skyscraper in Guangzhou, Guangdong, China. Construction started in 2011 and was completed in 2015.

== See also ==
- List of tallest buildings in China
