= Skyfame Center Landmark Tower =

General information
- Status: Completed
- Type: Mixed use: Hotel; Office; Residential
- Location: Nanning, Guangxi, China
- Construction started: 2016
- Estimated completion: 2026
- Opened: 2026

Height
- Height: 346 m (1,135 ft)

Technical details
- Floor count: 72

Skyfame Center Landmark Tower (Chinese: Skyfame中心地标塔) is a supertall skyscraper on-hold in Skyfame Center, Nanning, Guangxi, China. The design for the building is 346 metres (1,135.2 ft) tall.

== See also ==
- List of tallest buildings in China
