= Diwang International Fortune Center =

Supertall skyscraper in Liuzhou, Guangxi, China

Coordinates: 24.3206534°N 109.4117163°E

- 柳州地王国际财富中心
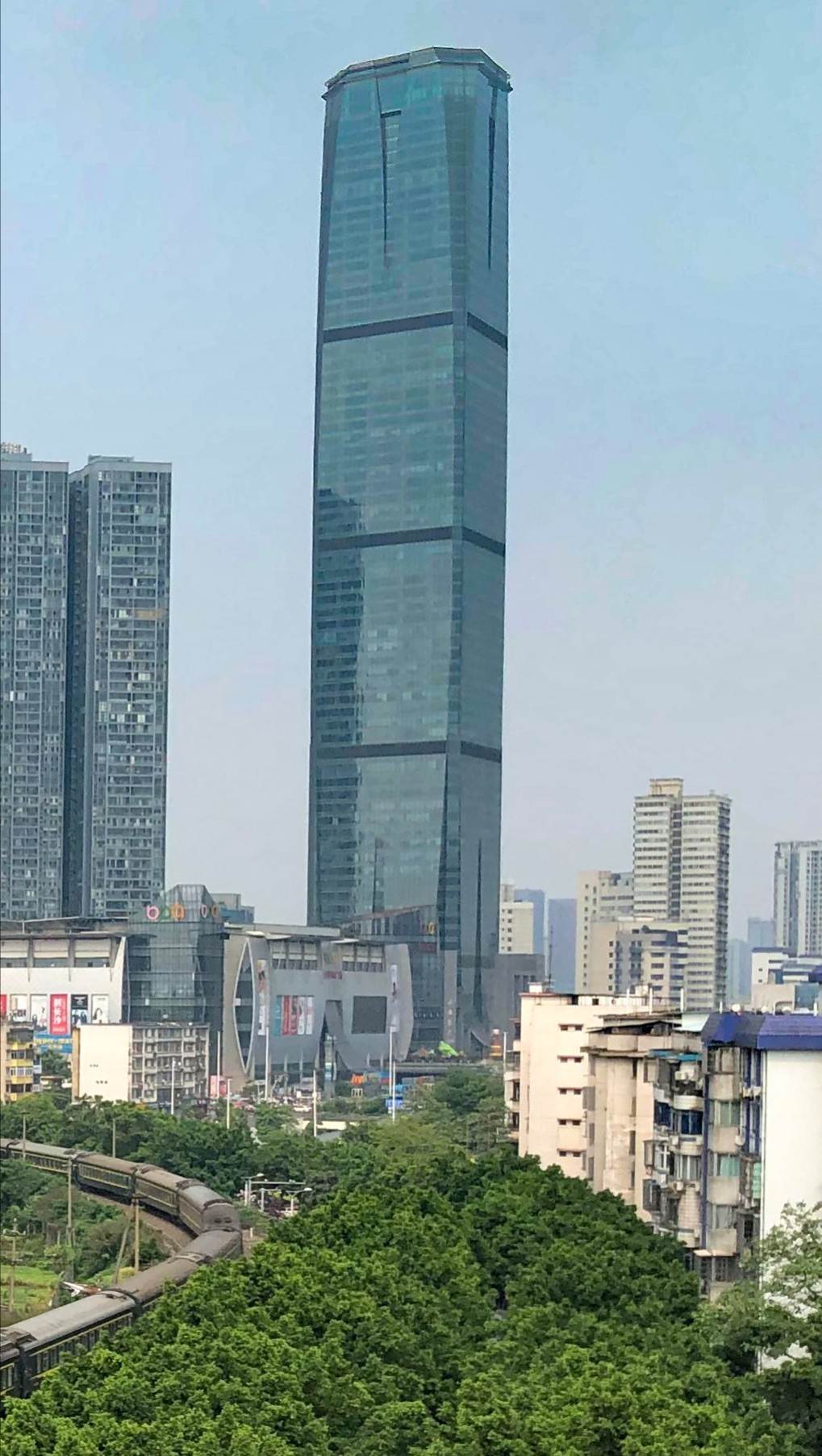
- Diwang International Fortune Center in April 2019
- Interactive map of the Diwang International Fortune Center area

General information
- Status: Completed
- Location: Liuzhou, Guangxi, 2 Guangchang Rd, Chengzhong, China
- Construction started: 2010
- Completed: 2015

Height
- Architectural: 303 m (994 ft)

Technical details
- Floor count: 72 above ground, 3 below ground

Design and construction
- Architecture firm: AECOM
- Main contractor: China State Construction Engineering Corporation

Diwang International Fortune Center is a supertall skyscraper in Liuzhou, Guangxi, China. It is 303 metres (994 feet) tall. Construction started in 2010 and was completed in 2015.

== See also ==
- List of tallest buildings in China
