= List of tallest buildings in Qingdao =

Tall buildings in Qingdao
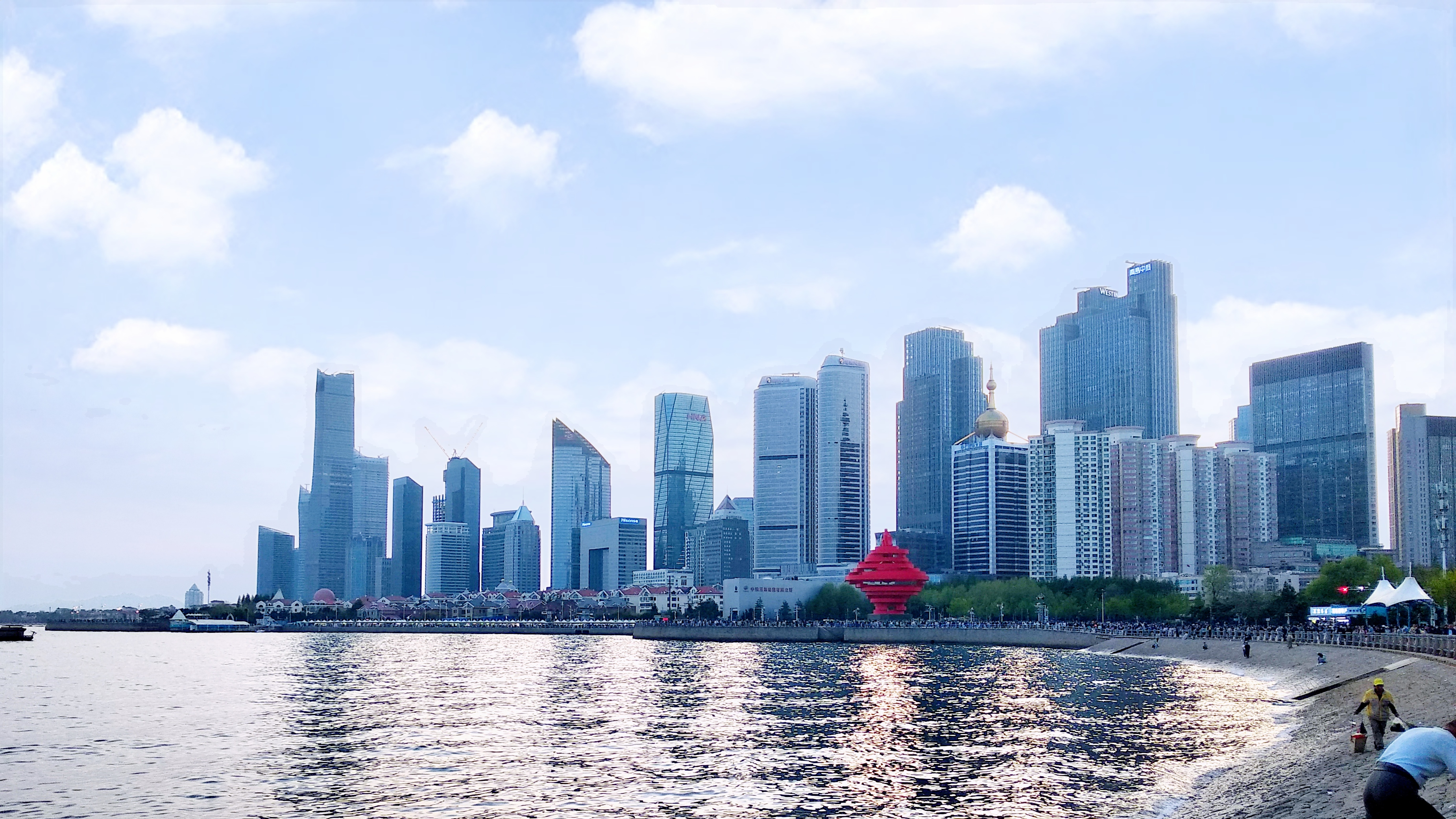
- Skyline of Qingdao on the Yellow Sea
- Tallest building: Qingdao Hai Tian Center (2021)
- Tallest building height: 368.9 m (1,210 ft)
- First 150 m+ building: Qingdao Parkson Plaza (1998)

Number of tall buildings
- Taller than 150 m (492 ft): 40 (2026)
- Taller than 200 m (656 ft): 17 (2026)
- Taller than 300 m (984 ft): 1

This list of tallest buildings in Qingdao ranks skyscrapers in Qingdao, China by height. Qingdao is the largest city in the Chinese province of Shandong, with a population of 10 million and an urban population of 7.1 million. Located on the coast of China's Yellow Sea coast, it is a major port and financial center. Qingdao's tallest buildings are mainly located in Shinan District, directly on the coast on Fushan Bay.

A significant skyscraper that was built before the development of most of the modern skyline was the Bank of China Mansion, a 241 m (791 ft), 54-storey office building built in 1999. It remained the tallest building in the city for almost 20 years until the completion of Lianyungang Lu 66 in 2018. Skyscrapers began to be constructed at an increased rate during the 2000s, and this trend accelerated in the 2010s.

As of 2026, Qingdao has 40 buildings greater than 150 m (492 ft) in height, 17 of which are taller than 200 meters. The tallest building in the city is the Hai Tian Center, a supertall skyscraper measuring 368.9 m (1,210 ft) in height. It is currently the city's only supertall skyscraper. However, another, Qingdao Landmark Tower 1, will join it when construction finishes in 2026.

== Tallest buildings ==
This lists ranks completed skyscrapers in Qingdao that stand at least 150 m (492 ft) tall based on standard height measurement. This includes spires and architectural details but does not include antenna masts. Existing structures are included for ranking purposes based on present height. This list does not include topped-out buildings that have not been completed.

Rank	Name	Image	Height	Floors	Use	Year	Notes
1	Qingdao Hai Tian Center		368.9 m	73	Mixed-use	2021	
2	China Resources Center Qingdao		250 m	-	Mixed-use	2021	
3	Lianyungang Lu 66		250 m	56	Office	2018	
4	Haitian Center Tower 3		245 m	55	Residential	2021	
5	Vanyue Lingyun		241.9 m	64	Mixed-use	2024	
6	Bank of China Mansion		241 m	54	Office	1999	
7	Tsingdao Center Tower B		238.3 m	51	Mixed-use	2014	
8	Tsingdao Center Tower A		238.3 m	51	Office	2014	
9	Qingdao Agora		238.3 m	52	Office	2011	
10	Excellence Century Center Tower 1		237.3 m	57	Office	2016	
11	Farglory International Plaza		223 m	42	Mixed-use	2011	
12	Qingdao Parkson Plaza		219.7 m	49	Mixed-use	1998	
13	Jinshi International Plaza 1		215 m	54	Hotel	2016	
14	Qingdao China Resources Residential Tower 7		212.7 m	63	Residential	2019	
15	Qingdao China Resources Residential Tower 6		212.7 m	63	Residential	2019	
16	Haitian Center Tower 1		210 m	40	Mixed-use	2021	
17	Shandong Port Tower		203.4 m	41	Office	2021	
18	Qingdao China Resources Residential Tower 8		199.5 m	-	Residential	-	
19	9 Donghai Lu Tower 1		198 m	50	Residential	2008	
20	9 Donghai Lu Tower 2		198 m	50	Residential	2008	
21	Qingdao Landmark Tower 3		195 m	48	Residential	2016	
22	Binhai Garden 2 Tower A		189 m (Note: Height is an estimate.)	43	Office	2006	
23	Qingdao Xinlian Tiandi Tower 3		186.4 m	39	Office	2022	
24	Qingdao Information Mansion		184 m (Note: Height is an estimate.)	42	Office	2009	
25	Tsingdao Center Tower C		183 m	43	Residential	2014	
26	Qingdao World Financial Centre Tower 3		180 m	44	Office	2018	
27	Qingdao World Financial Centre Tower 2		180 m	40	Office	2018	
28	Qingdao World Financial Centre Tower 1		180 m	40	Office	2018	
29	Zhidi Building 1		180 m	50	Residential	-	
30	Zhidi Building 2		180 m	50	Residential	-	
31	Crowne Plaza		175 m	38	Hotel	1998	
32	Qingdao Landmark Tower 2		173.4 m	42	Residential	2016	
33	Hyatt Center Tower 1		170 m	-	Office	-	
34	Excellence Century Center Tower 3		164 m	38	Office	2016	
35	Excellence Century Center Tower 2		164 m	38	Office	2016	
36	Huaren International Mansion		160 m	35	Office	2002	
37	International Customer Transportation Center Tower 2		158 m	42	Mixed-use	2002	
38	International Customer Transportation Center Tower 1		158 m	42	Mixed-use	2000	
39	Qingdao World Trade Center Tower B		150 m	-	Office	2012	
40	Hyatt Center Tower 2		150 m	-	Office	-	

== Tallest under construction or proposed ==
=== Under construction ===
This table lists buildings that are under construction in Qingdao that are planned to rise at least 150 m (492 feet) in height.

Name	Height* m / feet	Floors*	Use	Year	Notes
Qingdao Landmark Tower 1	328.6 m	71	Mixed-use	2025	
1 Nanjing Road	240 m	-	Mixed-use	2027	
Shanghai Industrial Investment Center Tower 2	193.8 m	-	Office	2023	
Shanghai Industrial Investment Center Tower 1	193.8 m	-	Office	2023	
