= Tianshan Gate of the World Plots 27 and 28 =

Skyscraper in Shijiazhuang, China

- 天山天门
- Interactive map of the Tianshan Gate of the World Plots 27 and 28 area

General information
- Status: On-hold
- Type: Office, hotel
- Location: Shijiazhuang, China
- Groundbreaking: 2019; 7 years ago
- Construction started: 2022; 4 years ago
- Completed: 2030; 4 years' time
- Owner: Tianshan Group

Height
- Height: 1,476 feet (450 m)

Technical details
- Floor count: 106

Design and construction
- Architect: Aedas

Tianshan Gate of the World Plots 27 and 28 is a mixed-use supertall skyscraper in Shijiazhuang, China, by the Tianshan Gate of the World Block A, International Finance Center. It will be 450 metres (1,476.4 ft) tall. Construction started in 2019 and is scheduled to be completed in 2025, however, progress is currently paused.

== See also ==
- List of tallest buildings in China
- List of tallest buildings in Shijiazhuang
