= List of tallest buildings in Guiyang =

Tall buildings in Guiyang
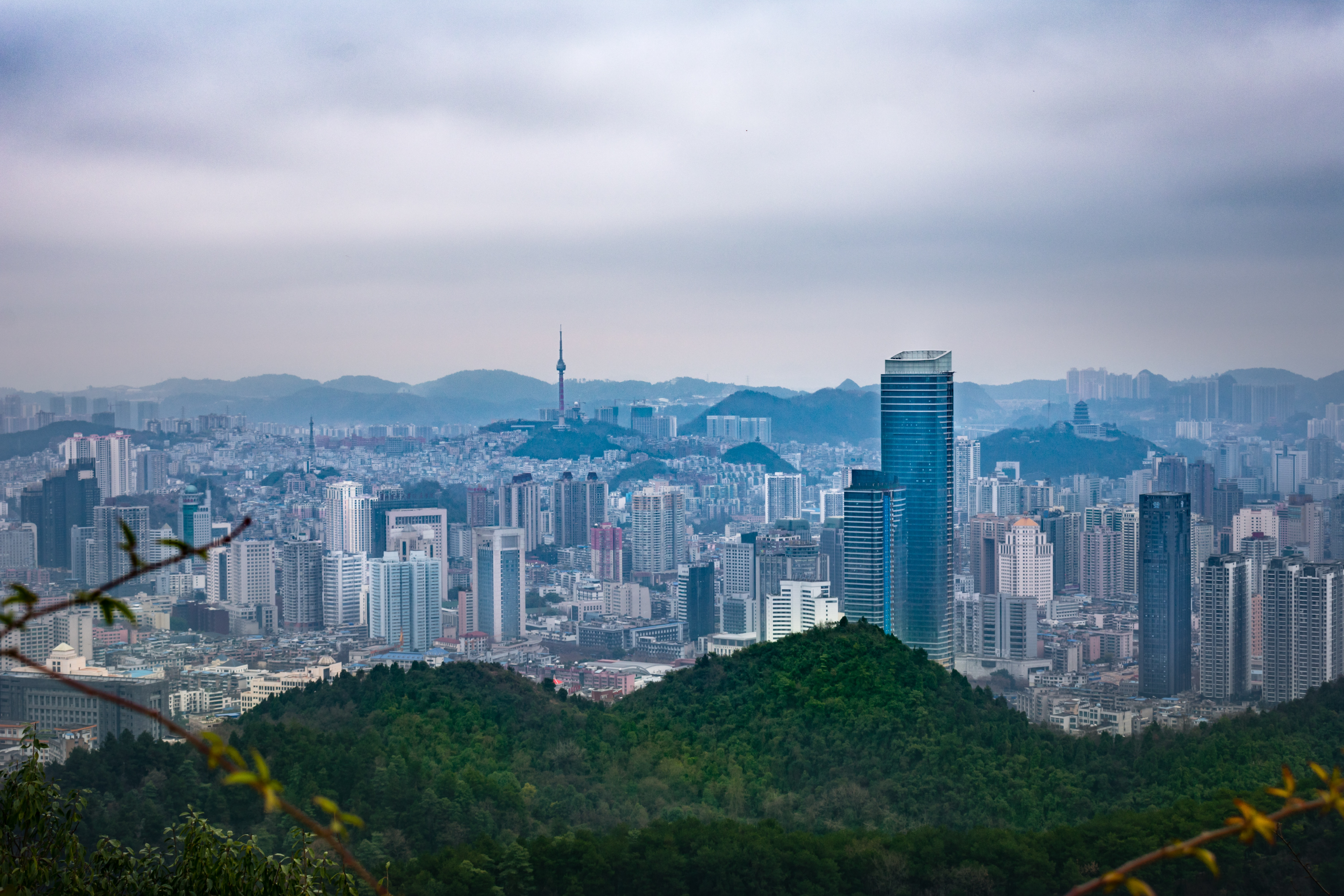
- Skyline of Guiyang in 2018
- Tallest building: Guiyang International Financial Center T1 (2020)
- Tallest building height: 401 m (1,316 ft)
- First 150 m+ building: Quanlin International Plaza Main Tower (2002)

Number of tall buildings
- Taller than 150 m (492 ft): 36 (2025)
- Taller than 200 m (656 ft): 26 (2025)
- Taller than 300 m (984 ft): 3

This list of tallest buildings in Guiyang ranks skyscrapers in the Chinese city of Guiyang by height. Guiyang is the capital and largest city of the Chinese province of Guizhou, with a population of over 5.9 million and an urban area population of 4.5 million. It is a major industrial and research centre in southwestern China. Guiyang is a hilly city and its forested peaks can be seen among the high-rises in the cityscape.

Before 2010, Guiyang had only two completed skyscrapers taller than 150 m. Kempinski Hotel, built in 2011 to a height of 228 m (748 ft) set a new benchmark for height in the city. Guiyang's construction boom began in earnest in the mid-2010s; a new tallest building, Hunter Douglas International Plaza, was completed in 2015 at a height of 250.3 m (821 ft). The rate of construction has remained steady since. The current tallest building in the city is Guiyang International Financial Center T1, a supertall skyscraper built in 2020 that reaches 401 m (1,316 ft) in height. It is the tallest building in southwestern China. The proposed Guizhou Culture Plaza Tower, if built, would become the tallest building in the city at 450 m (1,476 ft)

As of 2026, Guiyang has 39 completed buildings that reach a height of 150 metres (492 feet), 26 of which are taller than 200 m (656 ft). It is the largest skyline in Guizhou and southwestern China. Besides Guiyang International Financial Center, Guiyang has two other supertall skyscrapers, both belonging to the Twin Towers Guiyang complex. The complex is located in the area of Huaguoyuan, one of the world's largest residential projects. Guiyang's skyline is also notable for the 121 m Liebian International Building, which incorporates a 108 m high waterfall, the largest artificial waterfall in an urban area.

== Tallest buildings ==
This lists ranks completed skyscrapers in Guiyang that stand at least 200 m (556 ft) tall as of October 2026, based on standard height measurement. This includes spires and architectural details but does not include antenna masts.

Was the tallest building in Guiyang upon completion

Rank	Building	Image	Height	Floors	Use	Year	Notes
1	Guiyang International Financial Center T1		401 m	79	Mixed-use	2020	
2	Twin Towers Guiyang, East Tower		335 m	74	Office	2020	
3	Twin Towers Guiyang, West Tower		335 m	74	Mixed-use	2020	
4	Guizhou Park Office Tower		276 m	55	Mixed-use	2019	
5	Guiyang International Financial Center T2		275 m	54	Office	2020	
6	Hunter Douglas International Plaza		250.3 m	59	Mixed-use	2015	
7	Guiyang Old Department Store Renovation Project		248 m	55	Office	2021	
8	Bank of Guiyang Headquarters Building		235.3 m	48	Office	2016	
9	Maotai International Business Center 1		233.6 m	49	Office	2019	
10	Hengfeng Guiyang Center Tower 3		233.4 m	67	Residential	2022	
11	Kempinski Hotel		228 m	53	Hotel	2011	
12	Fangzhou Dong Mao Center 2		227.5 m	50	Office	2019	
13	Fangzhou Dong Mao Center 1		227.5 m	50	Office	2019	
14	Huaguoyuan Hotel		224.4 m	50	Hotel	2022	
15	Hengfeng Guiyang Center Tower 4		220.8 m	69	Residential	2022	
16	Hengfeng Guiyang Center Tower 5		220.8 m	69	Residential	2022	
17	Guiyang Financial Center 14		213.8 m	43	Office	2016	
18	Future Ark G7 Building 3		213 m	60	Mixed-use	2024	
19	Asia-Pacific Center		210 m	55	Office	2016	
20	Jianghua Global Center Tower 1		208 m	42	Office	2024	
21	Zhongtian Exhibition City 2		204.8 m	43	Office	2015	
22	Zhongtian Exhibition City 1		204.8 m	43	Office	2015	
23	Future Ark G7 Building 4		203.9 m	57	Mixed-use	2024	
24	Huijin International Plaza		202 m	40	Mixed-use	2016	
25	201 Tower		201 m	39	Office	2011	
26	Guiyang Financial Center 9		200 m	38	Office	2017	

== Tallest under construction or proposed ==
=== Under construction ===
This lists ranks completed skyscrapers in Guiyang that are expected to be at least 200 m (656 ft) tall as of 2026, based on standard height measurement.

Building	Height	Floors	Use	Year	Notes
Zhongtian Future Ark Global Valley Tower 4	255.2 m	62	Mixed-use	2025	
Zhongtian Future Ark Global Valley Tower 2	249.2 m	60	Mixed-use	2025	
Zhongtian Future Ark Global Valley Tower 3	243.2 m	58	Mixed-use	2025	

=== Proposed ===
This lists ranks proposed skyscrapers in Guiyang that are planned to be at least 200 m (656 ft) tall as of 2026, based on standard height measurement.

Building	Height	Floors	Use	Year	Notes
Guizhou Culture Plaza Tower	450 m	97	Mixed-use	2027	
