= Xiangmi Lake New Financial Center =

Skyscraper complex in Shenzhen, China

- 香蜜湖新金融中心; Xiāng mì hú xīn jīnróng zhōngxīn

General information
- Status: On-hold
- Type: Office
- Architectural style: Modern
- Location: Futian District, Shenzhen, China, Xiangmihu Road
- Construction started: November 2022
- Estimated completion: TBA

Height
- Height: 500 m (1,600 ft); 370 m (1,210 ft); 370 m (1,210 ft); 300 m (980 ft)

Technical details
- Structural system: Steel; Reinforced concrete
- Floor count: 109, 81, 80, 64
- Floor area: 2,320,000 m^{2} (25,000,000 sq ft)

Xiangmi Lake New Financial Center (Chinese: 香蜜湖新金融中心; pinyin: Xiāng mì hú xīn jīnróng zhōngxīn) is a complex of four supertall skyscrapers on-hold in Shenzhen, China.

== Overview ==
The complex is being built in Futian District, facing the Xiangmi Lake. It is expected to become the fourth largest financial centre in China, after Hong Kong's Central District, Shanghai's Lujiazui and Beijing's Financial Street.

Xiangmi Lake New Financial Center will feature four skyscrapers:

- Tower I: 500 metres (1,600 ft), 109 floors
- Tower II: 370 metres (1,210 ft), 81 floors
- Tower III: 370 metres (1,210 ft), 80 floors
- Tower IV: 300 metres (980 ft), 64 floors

Upon completion, the Tower I will be the sixth tallest building in China and the 12th tallest in the world. The four high-rises account for a total floor area of 2,320,000 m^{2} (25,000,000 sq ft).

The complex will also feature public cultural facilities such as the Shenzhen International Exchange Center, the Shenzhen Reform and Opening-up Exhibition Hall and the International Performing Arts Center.

Development is taking place on a lot with about 64,000 square metres (690,000 sq ft). The Shenzhen Municipal Party Committee approved the project on 24 December 2021. Construction began in November 2022 and is expected to be completed in 2026.

== See also ==
- List of tallest buildings in Shenzhen
- List of tallest buildings in China
