= Jinan Center Financial City =

Supertall skyscraper in Jinan, Shandong, China

- Interactive map of the Jinan Center Financial City area
- Alternative names: Han Yu Finance Business Center A5-3; Jinan Center Financial City A5-3

General information
- Status: Completed
- Location: Jinan, Shandong, China
- Coordinates: 36.6596477°N 117.1422293°E
- Construction started: 2016
- Completed: 2020

Height
- Architectural: 339 metres (1,112.2 ft)
- Tip: 339 metres (1,112.2 ft)
- Top floor: 315.5 metres (1,035.1 ft)

Technical details
- Floor count: 69

Design and construction
- Architect: CCDI Group

Jinan Center Financial City is a supertall skyscraper located in Jinan, Shandong, China. It is 339 metres (1,112.2 ft) tall. Construction started in 2014 and was completed in 2020. It is the tallest building in Jinan.

== See also ==
- List of tallest buildings in China
