= Suning Plaza, Wuxi =

Supertall skyscraper in Wuxi, Jiangsu, China

Wuxi Suning Plaza 1
- 无锡国际金融中心
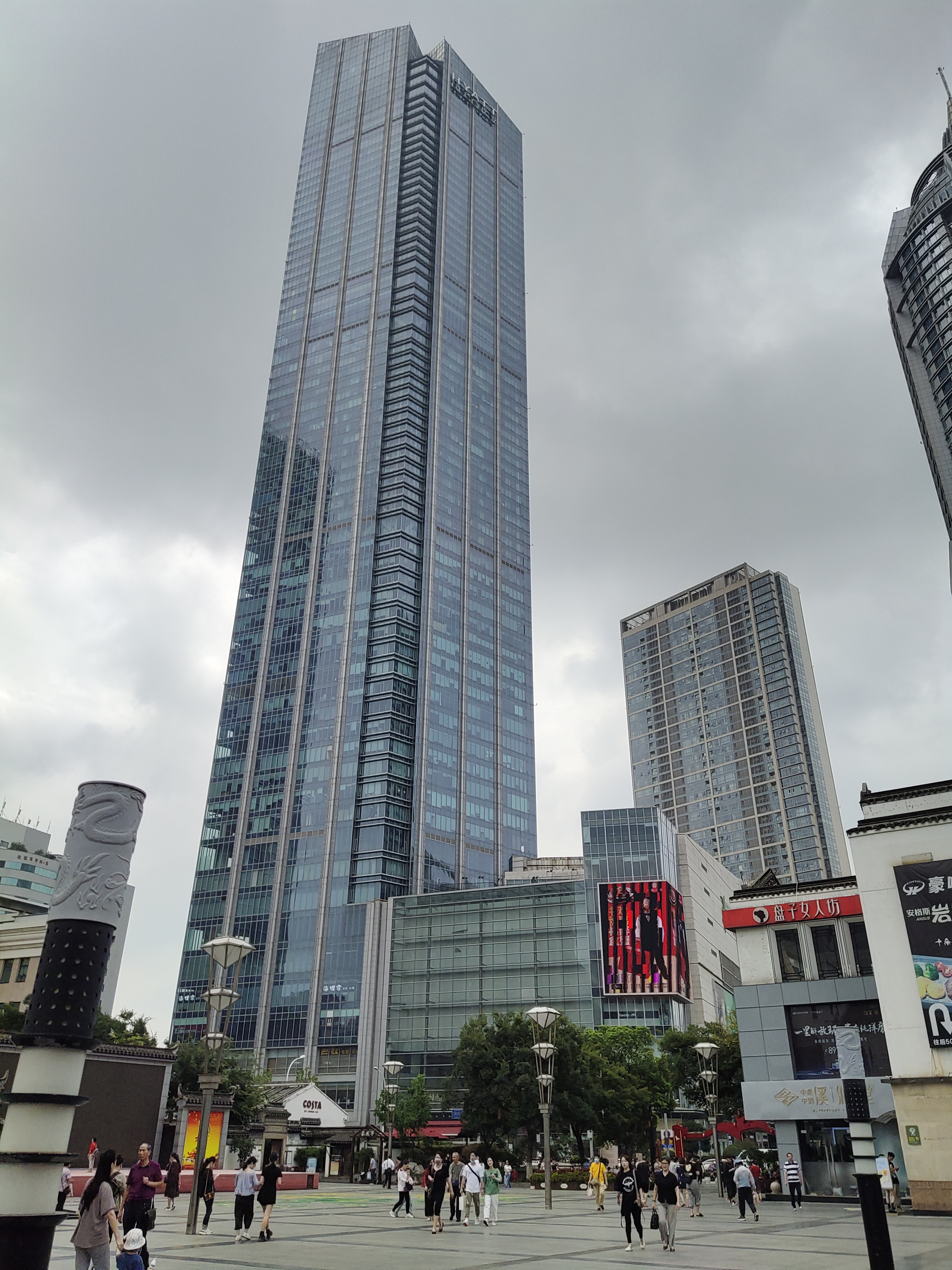
- Interactive map of the Wuxi Suning Plaza 1 area
- Alternative names: Wuxi Suning North Tower

General information
- Status: Completed
- Type: Mixed-use
- Location: Wuxi, Jiangsu, China
- Construction started: April 10, 2010
- Topped-out: September 21, 2013
- Completed: 2014
- Opened: November 21, 2014
- Owner: Suning Real Estate Group

Height
- Tip: 328 m (1,076 ft)
- Top floor: 328 m (1,076 ft)

Technical details
- Floor count: 72
- Floor area: 116,580 m^{2} (1,254,900 ft^{2})

Design and construction
- Architect: RTKL
- Structural engineer: Jiangsu Provincial Architectural D&R Institute Ltd
- Main contractor: China Construction First Group Construction & Development Co., Ltd

Wuxi Suning Plaza 1 is a supertall skyscraper in Wuxi, Jiangsu, China. It has a height of 328 metres (1,076 ft). Construction began in 2010 and ended in 2014. It functions as a hotel, apartment, and office building.

== See also ==
- List of tallest buildings in China
