= Ping An Finance Center Tower 1 =

Skyscraper in Jinan, Shandong, China

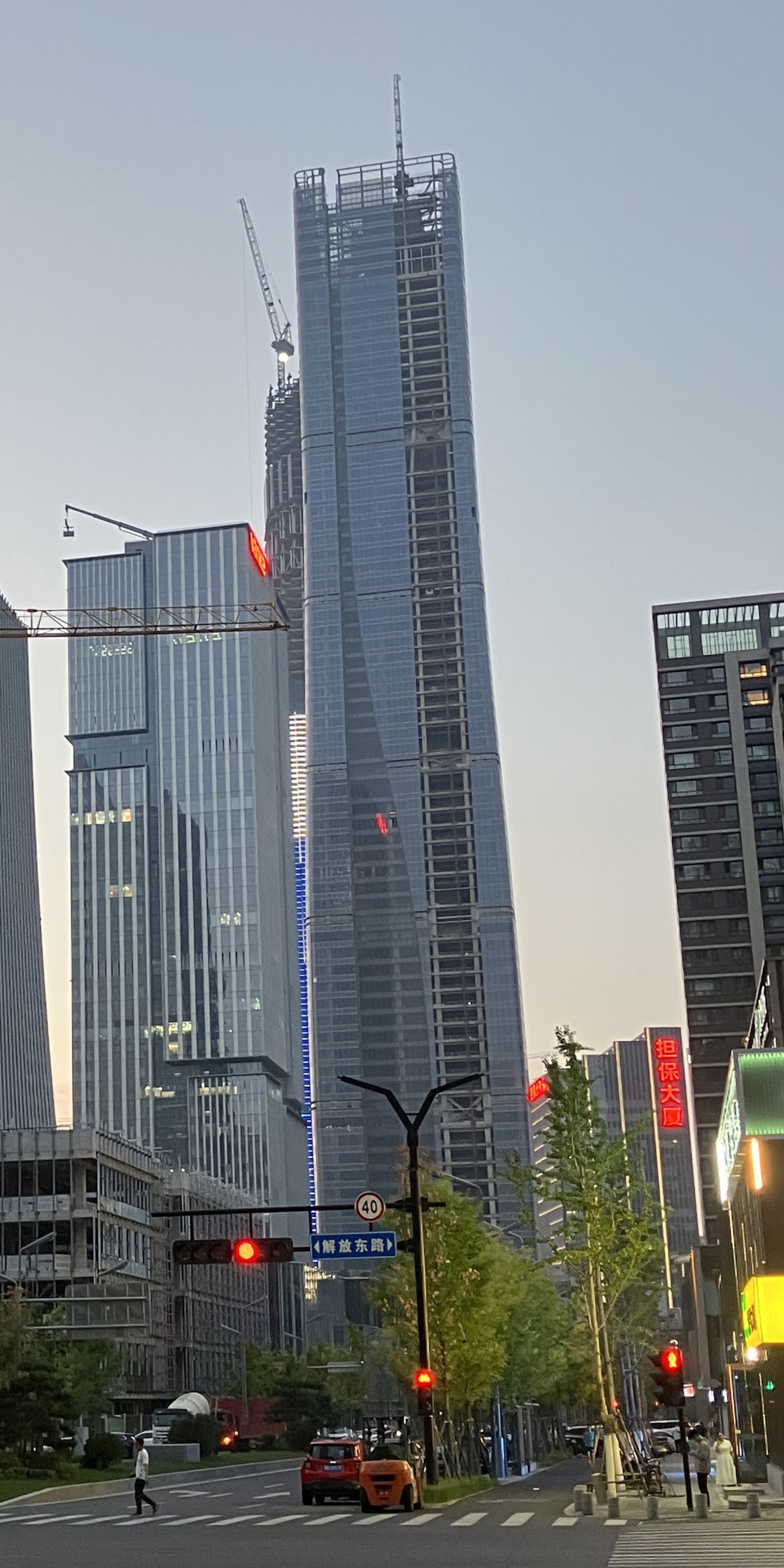
- Seen under construction in 2023
- Interactive map of the Ping An Finance Center Tower 1 area

General information
- Status: Completed
- Type: Office, Hotel, Retail
- Location: Jinan, Shandong, China
- Coordinates: 36°40′3.41″N 117°05′53.59″E
- Construction started: 2018
- Completed: 2023
- Owner: Jinan Anqi Real Estate Development

Height
- Architectural: 360 m (1,180 ft)

Technical details
- Floor count: 63

Design and construction
- Architecture firm: Kohn Pedersen Fox
- Main contractor: China Construction Eighth Building Group

Ping An Finance Center Tower 1 is a super-tall skyscraper in Jinan, Shandong, in the People's Republic of China. The structure is 360 meters high and has 63 floors. Construction began in 2018 and was completed in 2023.

The mixed-use building includes office floors, hotel rooms and retail space. There is a lush sky garden on the top of the building. The building is located in the heart of downtown Jinan, near the Metropolis Vanke Center, with both buildings architecturally coordinated.

== See also ==
- List of tallest buildings
- List of tallest buildings in China
