= Wuxi Maoye City – Marriott Hotel =

Supertall skyscraper in Wuxi, Jiangsu, China

Coordinates: 31.5524°N 120.3045°E

- 无锡茂业中心
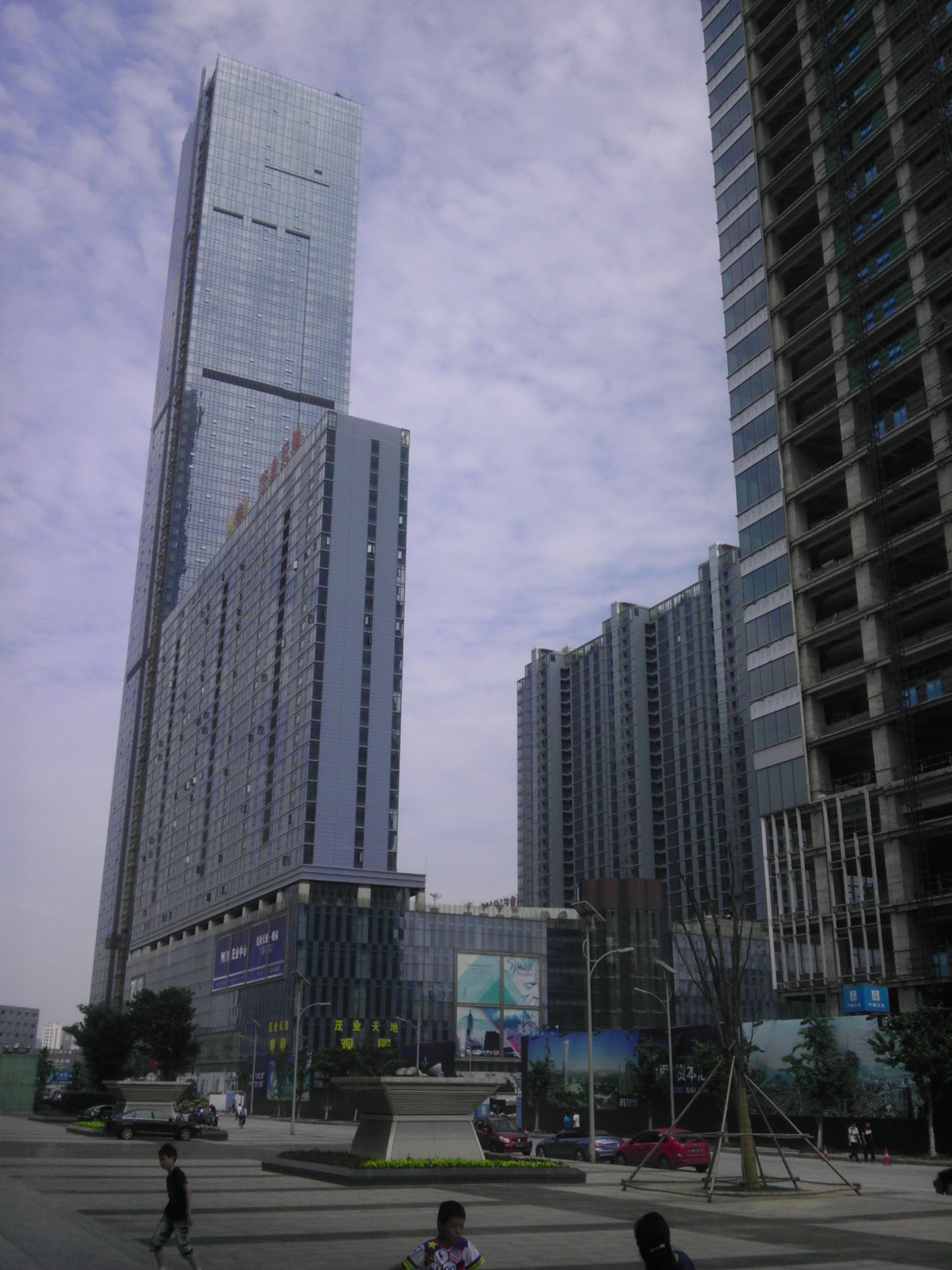
- Interactive map of the Wuxi Maoye City – Marriott Hotel area

General information
- Location: Wuxi, China
- Construction started: October 21, 2008
- Completed: May 9, 2014

Height
- Architectural: 304 m (997 ft)
- Tip: 304 m (997 ft)
- Top floor: 267 m (876 ft)

Technical details
- Floor count: 68

Design and construction
- Main contractor: China State Construction Engineering Corporation

Wuxi Maoye City – Marriott Hotel is a 304 m (997 ft) supertall skyscraper located in Wuxi, Jiangsu, China. Construction began in 2008 and ended in 2014. The building was one of the first supertalls in the city. Its core is made of reinforced concrete and is clad in a glass curtain wall. Belt trusses hide the mechanical floor on floors 26 and 46.

== See also ==
- List of tallest buildings in China
- List of tallest buildings in the world
