= Jiangxi Nanchang Greenland Central Plaza =

Supertall skyscraper in Nanchang, Jiangxi, China

Nanchang Greenland Central Plaza
- 南昌绿地中央广场
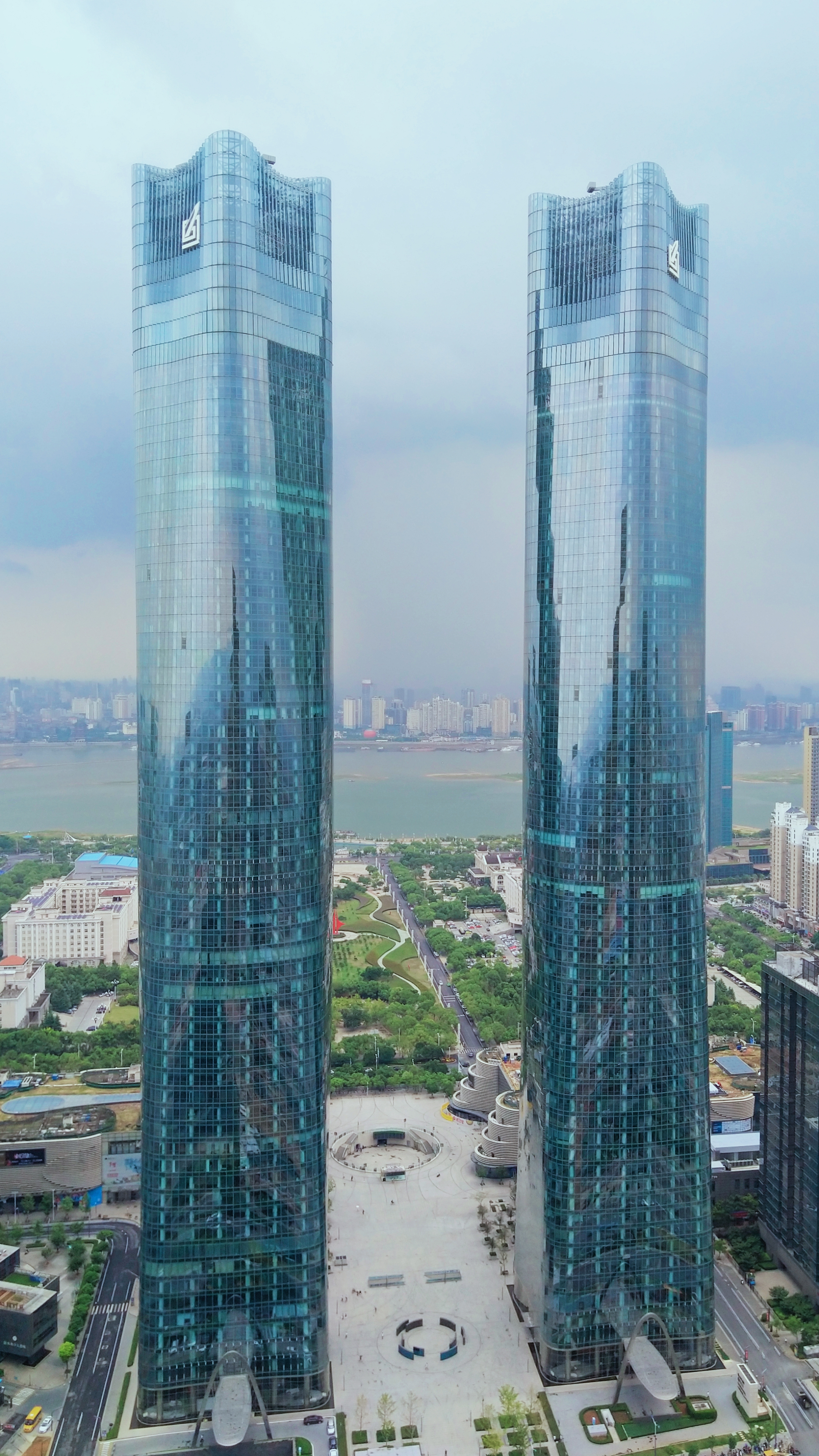
- The Nanchang Greenland Central Plaza in September 2018
- Interactive map of the Nanchang Greenland Central Plaza area

General information
- Status: Completed
- Location: Nanchang, China
- Construction started: 2011
- Completed: 2015

Height
- Architectural: 303 m (994 ft)
- Tip: 303 m (994 ft)

Technical details
- Floor count: 59

Nanchang Greenland Central Plaza (Chinese: 南昌绿地中央广场) are two supertall skyscrapers in Nanchang, Jiangxi, China. They have a height of 303 metres (994 ft). Construction began in 2011 and ended in 2015.

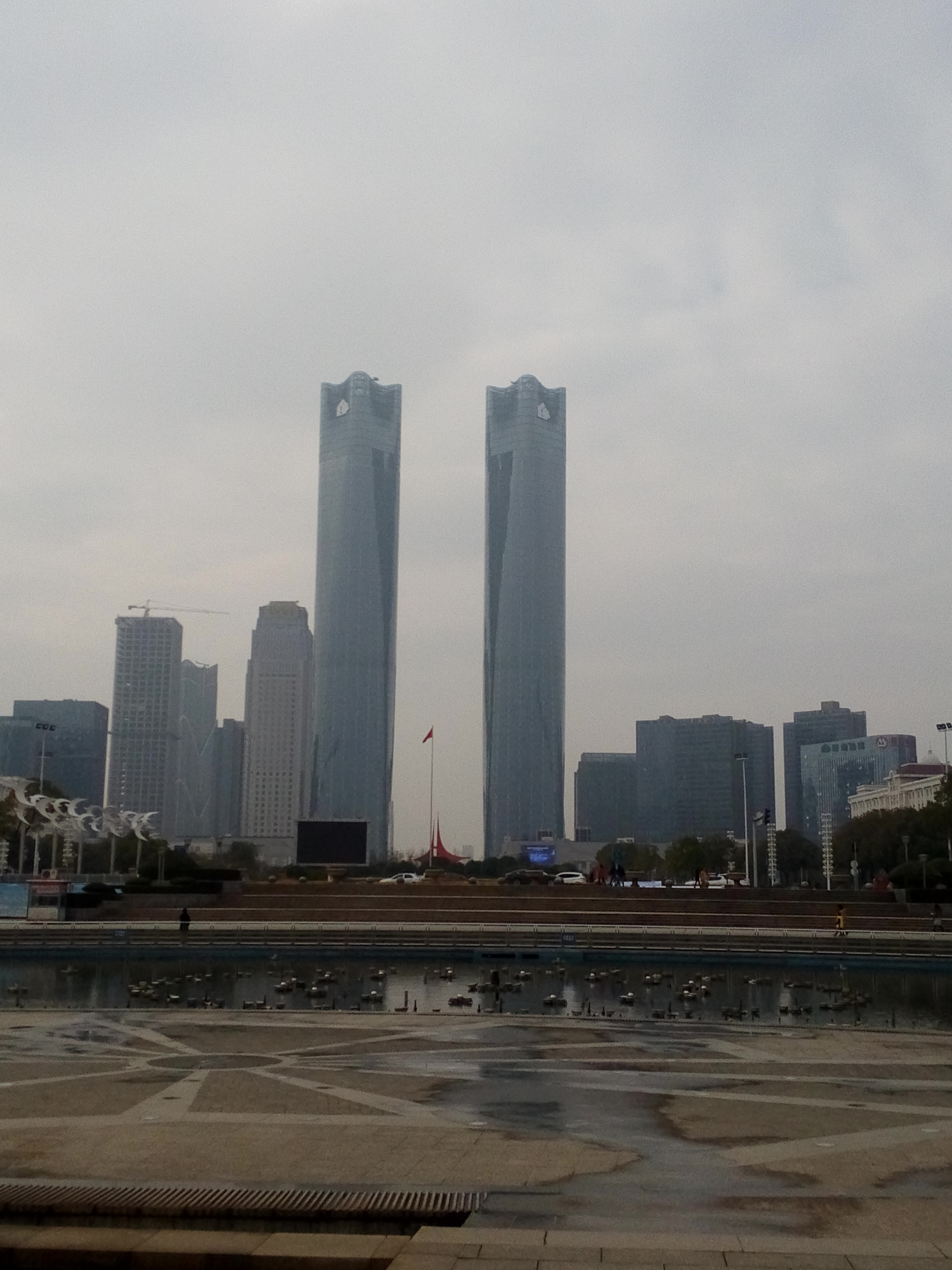
秋水广场中央喷泉和远处的绿地双子塔 (Autumn Center Square fountain and the Distant Green Twin Towers)

== See also ==
- List of tallest buildings in China
