= Runhua Global Center 1 =

Stalled supertall skyscraper in Changzhou, China

- Interactive map of the Runhua Global Center 1 area

General information
- Status: On hold
- Location: Changzhou, China
- Coordinates: 31°41′52.3″N 119°57′32.3″E
- Construction started: 2011
- Completed: TBA

Height
- Architectural: 300 m (984 ft)
- Tip: 300 m (984 ft)
- Top floor: 288 m (945 ft)

Technical details
- Floor count: 63

Design and construction
- Architecture firm: East China Architectural Design & Research Institute

The Runhua Global Center 1 is a stalled supertall skyscraper in Changzhou, China. If completed, it would have become the second-tallest building in Changzhou after the Modern Media Center and the tallest building in the city by roof height. The building was planned to reach a height of 300 m (984 ft) and contain 63 floors. Construction began in 2011, but work has been on hold since approximately 2014.

== See also ==
- List of tallest buildings in China
