= Mandarin Oriental Chengdu =

Hotel in Chengdu, Sichuan, China

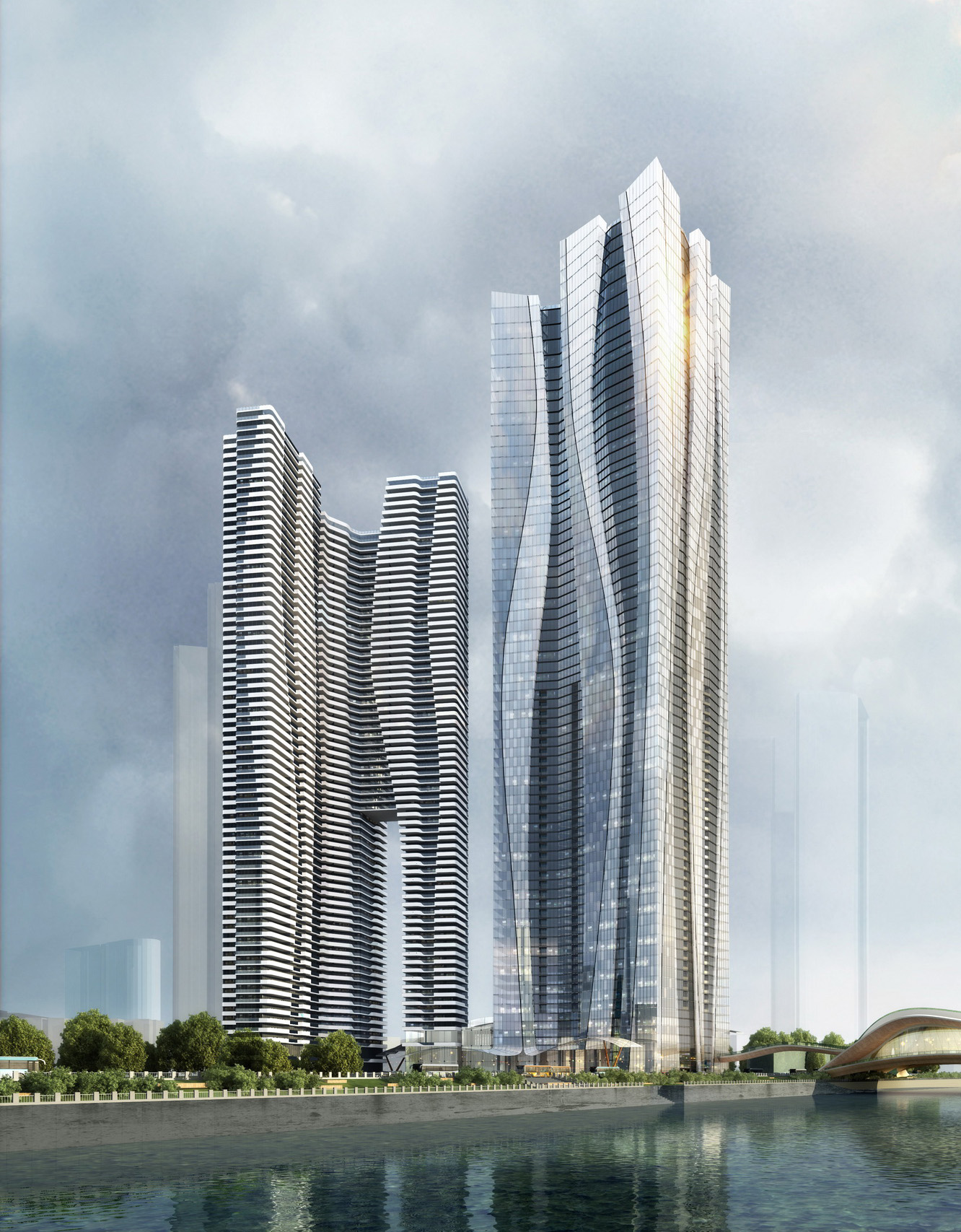
- A concept drawing of the Mandarin Oriental Chengdu
- Interactive map of the Mandarin Oriental Chengdu area

General information
- Status: Under construction
- Type: Mixed-use
- Location: Shunjiang Road, Jin-jiang District, Chengdu, Sichuan, China
- Coordinates: 30.6367535°N 104.0918189°E
- Construction started: 2013
- Completed: 2029
- Owner: Mind Group
- Management: Mandarin Oriental Hotel Group

Height
- Architectural: 333 metres (1,092.5 ft)
- Tip: 333 metres (1,092.5 ft)
- Roof: 302.7 metres (993.1 ft) rooftop pool, rooftop clubhouse

Technical details
- Floor count: 73
- Floor area: 17,175 square metres

Design and construction
- Architect: Aedas
- Developer: Mind Group

The Mandarin Oriental Chengdu is a supertall skyscraper on hold in Chengdu, the capital of Sichuan province in southwest China. It will be 333 metres (1,092.5 ft) tall. Construction started in 2013.

The tower is a mixed-use development located on a riverfront site in the Jin-jiang district. The tower was designed by Aedas.

The Mandarin Oriental Chengdu will have a rooftop bar and tea lounge, a Chinese restaurant serving Sichuan cuisine, three speciality dining venues and a cake shop. The hotel will also have a 1,200-seat ballroom and a 500-seat junior ballroom, as well as a variety of multi-purpose function spaces, which will be used to host conferences of all sizes.

== See also ==
- List of tallest buildings in China
