= Eye of Spring Trade Center =

Coordinates: 25°2′16″N 102°43′1″E

- 春之眼商业中心
- Interactive map of the Eye of Spring Trade Center area

General information
- Status: On-hold
- Type: hotel / office / retail
- Location: Kunming, Yunnan, China
- Construction started: December 13, 2017
- Opening: 2027

Height
- Architectural: 407 metres (1,335.3 ft); 326 metres (1,069.6 ft)

Technical details
- Floor count: 100; 72

Design and construction
- Architects: Skidmore, Owings & Merrill

The Eye of Spring Trade Center, also known as Dongfeng Plaza, is a complex of two skyscrapers on-hold in Kunming, China. The towers will be 100 storeys at 407 metres (1,335.3 ft) and 72 storeys at 326 metres (1,069.6 ft) tall. Once completed, they will be the tallest in Kunming and Yunnan province.

The Eye of Spring complex is a part of the re-development of Dongfeng Square. Prior to the start of construction, The Historic Workers' Cultural Hall was demolished, the Dongfeng Square dug up, and work began on two underground metro stations on opposite sides of the square. Construction started in 2017 but was put on hold in Mid-2020, before construction resumed in 2021.

== See also ==
- List of tallest buildings in Kunming
- List of tallest buildings in China
