= Shimao Hunan Center =

Supertall skyscraper in Changsha, Hunan, China

Shimao Global Financial Center
- 世茂环球金融中心
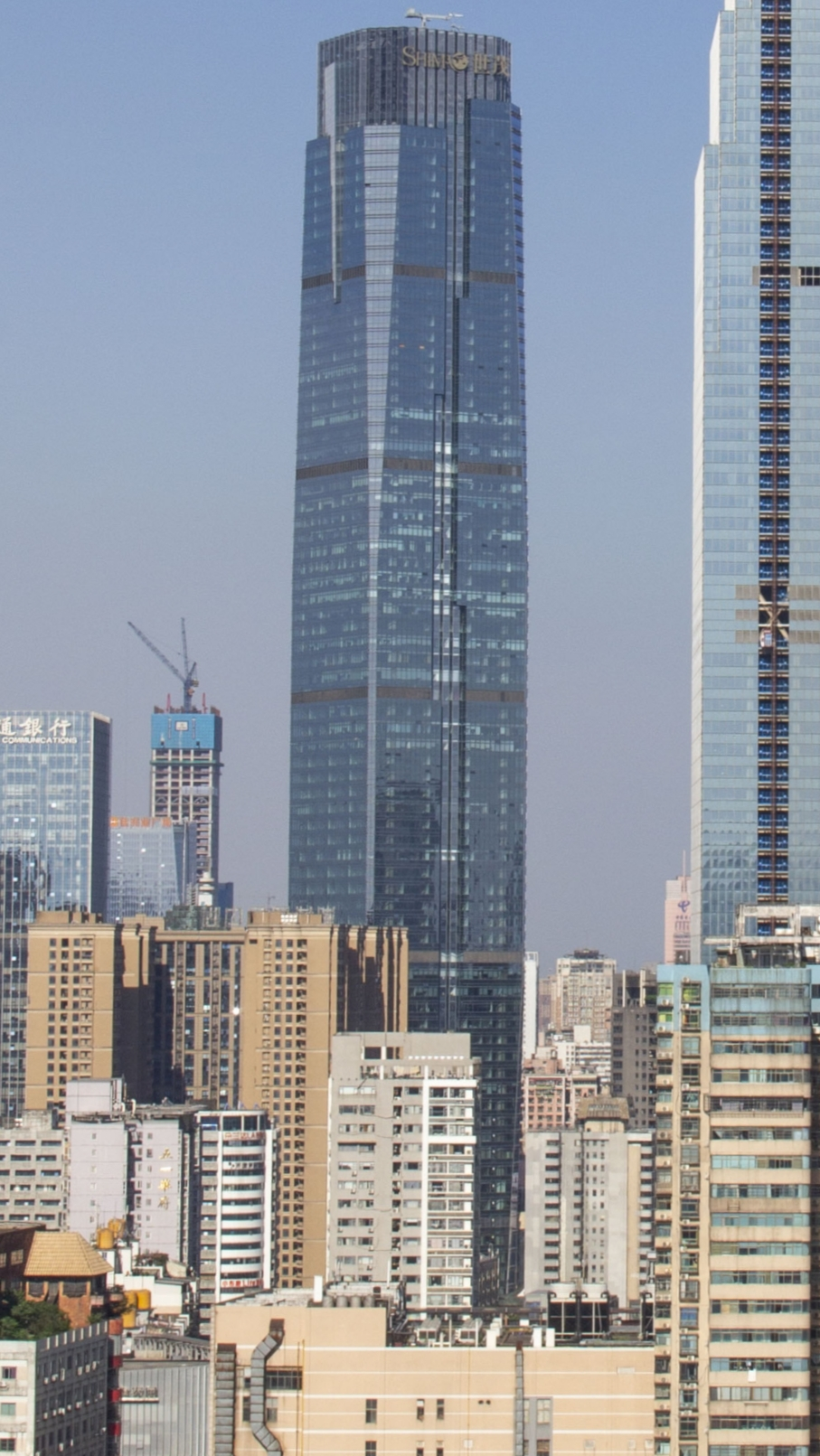
- Shimao World Financial Center in June 2021
- Interactive map of the Shimao Global Financial Center area
- Alternative names: Shimao Hunan Center

General information
- Status: Completed
- Location: Changsha, Hunan, China
- Coordinates: 28.19682°N 112.97862°E
- Construction started: December 13, 2014
- Completed: November 10, 2019

Height
- Architectural: 343 metres (1,125.3 ft)
- Tip: 343 metres (1,125.3 ft)
- Top floor: 324 metres (1,063.0 ft)

Technical details
- Floor count: 74

Shimao Global Financial Center (Chinese: 世茂环球金融中心) is a skyscraper in Changsha, Hunan, China. It is 343 metres (1,125.3 ft) tall. Construction started in 2014 and was completed in 2019.

== Gallery ==
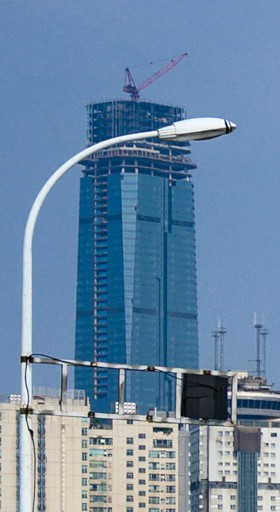
Under Construction in July 2019

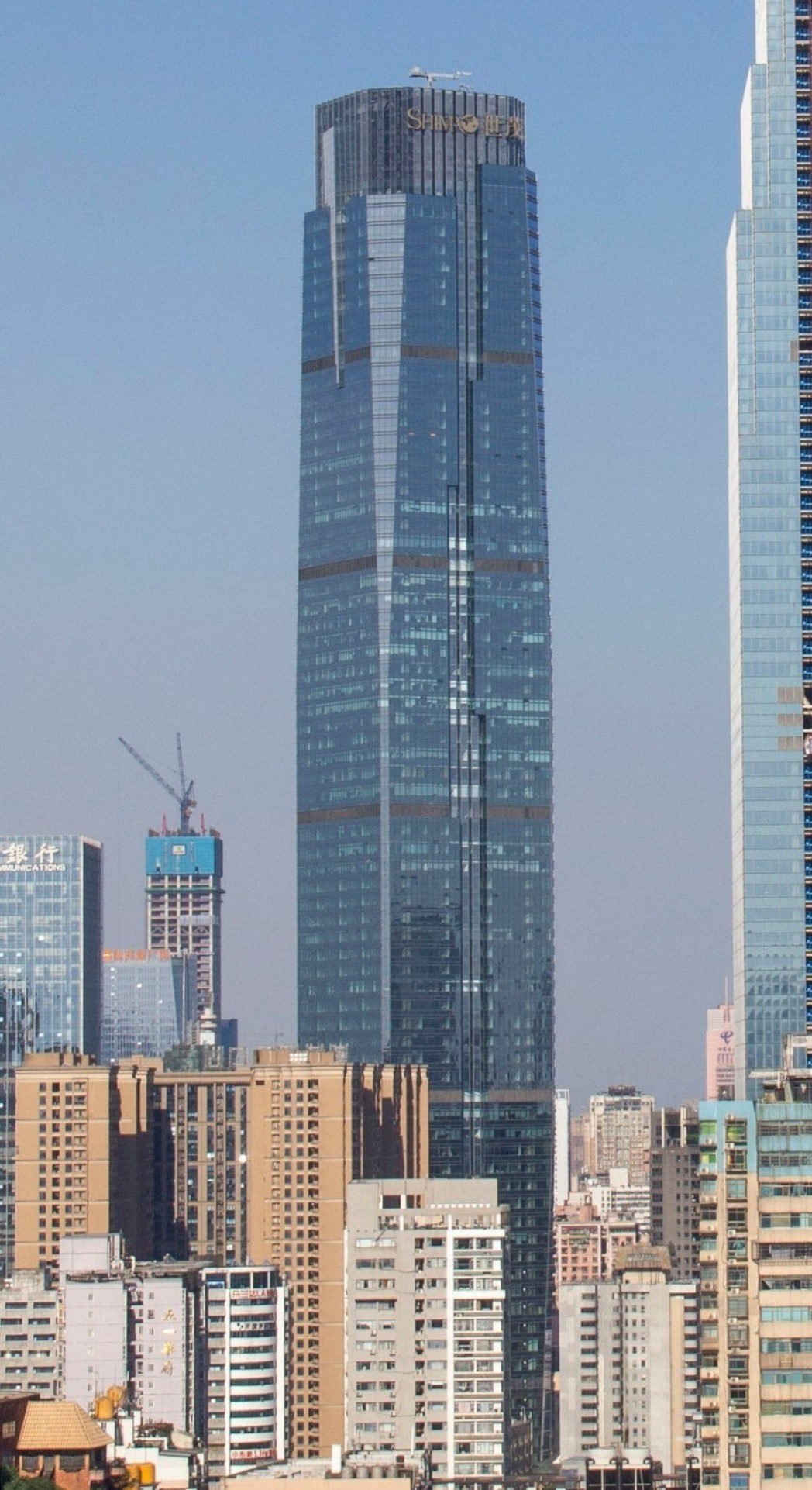
Shimao World Financial Center in June 2021

== See also ==
- List of tallest buildings in China
