= Suning Plaza, Zhenjiang =

Supertall skyscraper in Zhenjiang, Jiangsu, China

Suning Plaza Tower 1
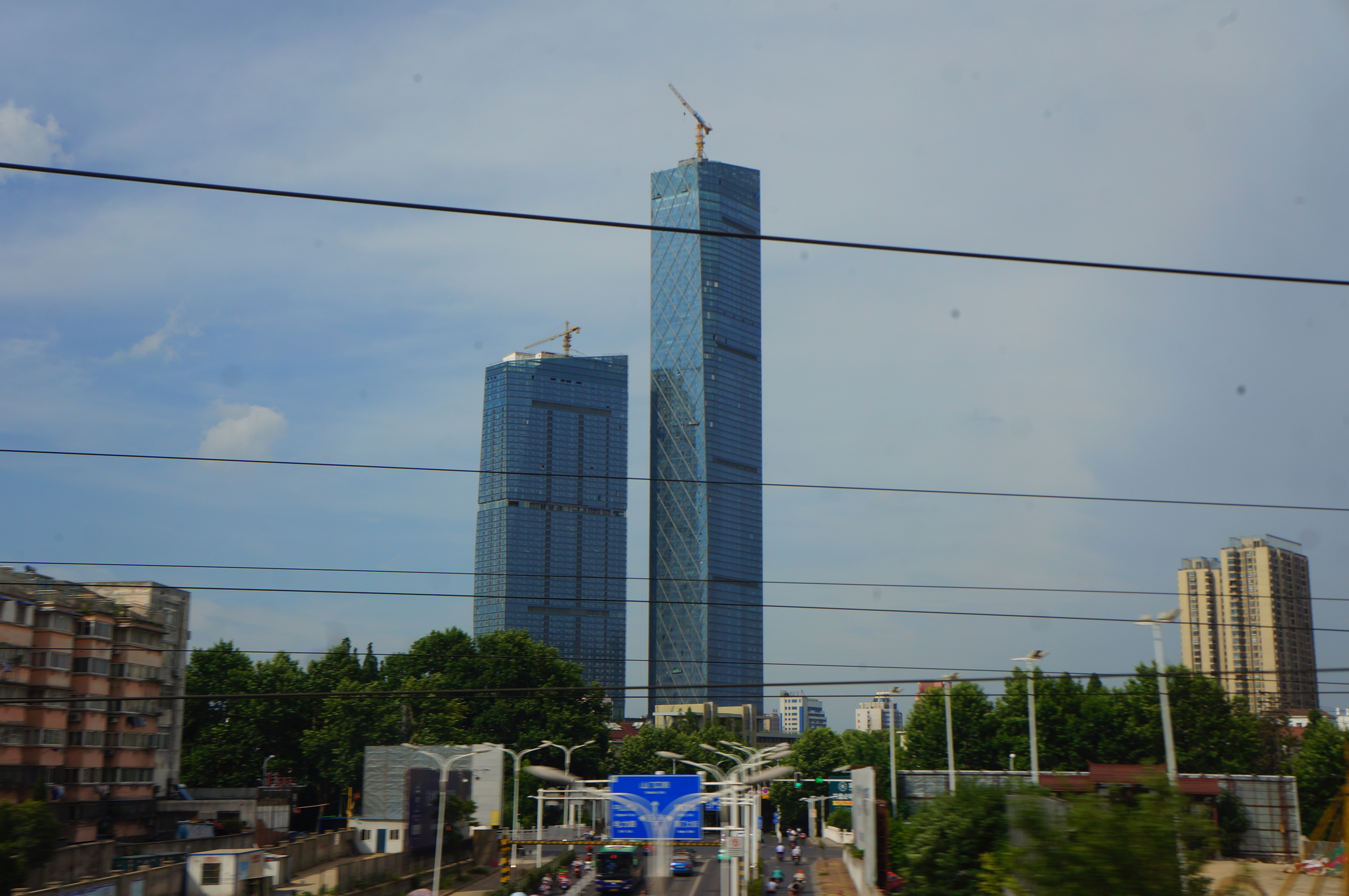
- Interactive map of the Suning Plaza Tower 1 area

General information
- Status: Completed
- Location: Zhongshan East Road, Zhenjiang, Jiangsu province, China
- Coordinates: 32.20613°N 119.44768°E
- Groundbreaking: March 20, 2010
- Construction started: July 1, 2012
- Completed: November 7, 2018

Height
- Architectural: 338 metres (1,108.9 ft)
- Roof: 308.4 metres (1,011.8 ft)
- Top floor: 308.4 metres (1,011.8 ft)

Technical details
- Floor count: 75 (+4 below ground)

Zhenjiang Suning Plaza (Chinese: 镇江苏宁广场) is a building complex in Zhenjiang, China. Tower 1 of the complex is a supertall skyscraper.

== See also ==
- List of tallest buildings in China
