= Tianjin Modern City Office Tower =

Supertall skyscraper in Tianjin, China

- 天津现代城B
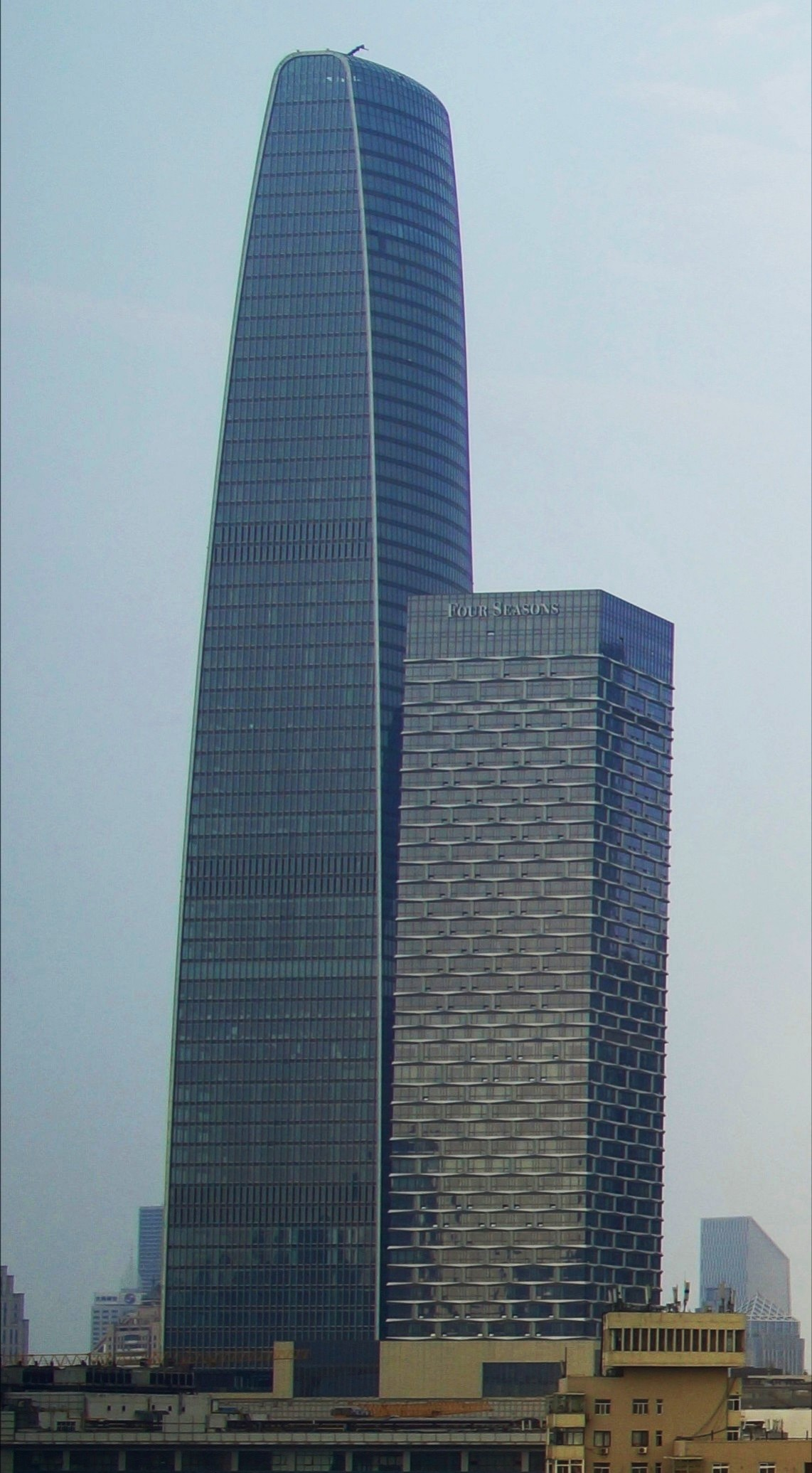
- Tianjin Modern City Office Tower
- Interactive map of the Tianjin Modern City Office Tower area

General information
- Status: Completed
- Location: Tianjin, China
- Coordinates: 39.11916°N 117.19237°E
- Groundbreaking: February 27, 2011
- Construction started: August 14, 2011
- Completed: October 11, 2016

Height
- Architectural: 338 m (1,109 ft)
- Tip: 338 m (1,109 ft)

Technical details
- Floor count: 65

Design and construction
- Main contractor: China State Construction

Tianjin Modern City Office Tower is a supertall skyscraper in Tianjin, China. It is 338 metres (1,109 feet) tall. It was first proposed in 2010. Construction began in 2011 and ended in 2016. The tower is a part of a set of two towers with the other tower, called "Four Seasons Tower", being 214.6 m (704 ft) tall.

The secondary tower is primarily used for a hotel with 259 guest rooms that is managed by Four Seasons Hotels and Resorts. It also has 90 residential units.

== See also ==
- List of tallest buildings in China
