= Huaguoyuan Towers =

Supertall skyscrapers in Guiyang, Guizhou, China

- 花果园双子塔
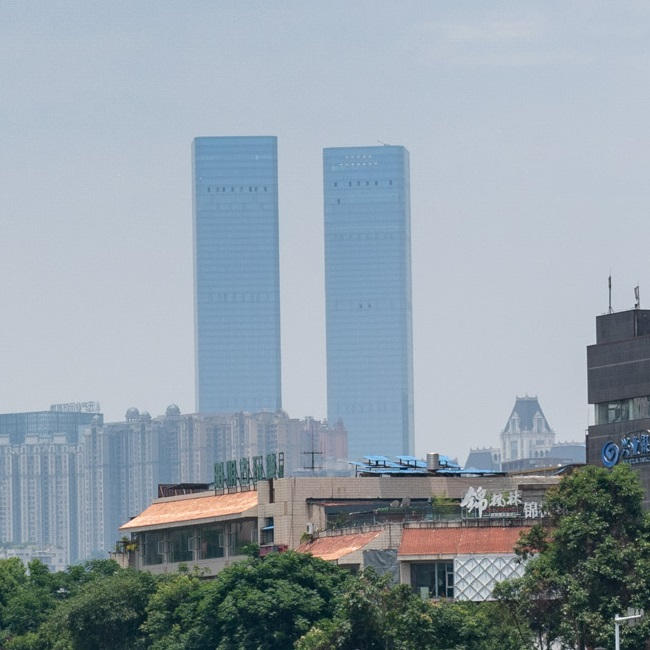
- Interactive map of the Huaguoyuan Towers area

General information
- Location: Guiyang, Guizhou, Wulichong Road, China
- Groundbreaking: 2012
- Construction started: 2012
- Completed: 2020
- Opened: 2020

Height
- Architectural: 335 metres (1,099.1 ft)
- Top floor: 329.4 metres (1,080.7 ft)

Technical details
- Floor count: 74

Design and construction
- Architecture firm: LWK & Partners
- Services engineer: Arup Group
- Main contractor: CSCEC

The Huaguoyuan Towers, also known as Twin Towers Guiyang, are a pair of supertall skyscrapers in Guiyang, Guizhou, China. They are 335 metres (1,099.1 ft) tall. Construction started in 2012 and was completed in 2020.

== See also ==
- List of tallest buildings in China
