= List of tallest buildings in Kunming =

Tall buildings in Kunming
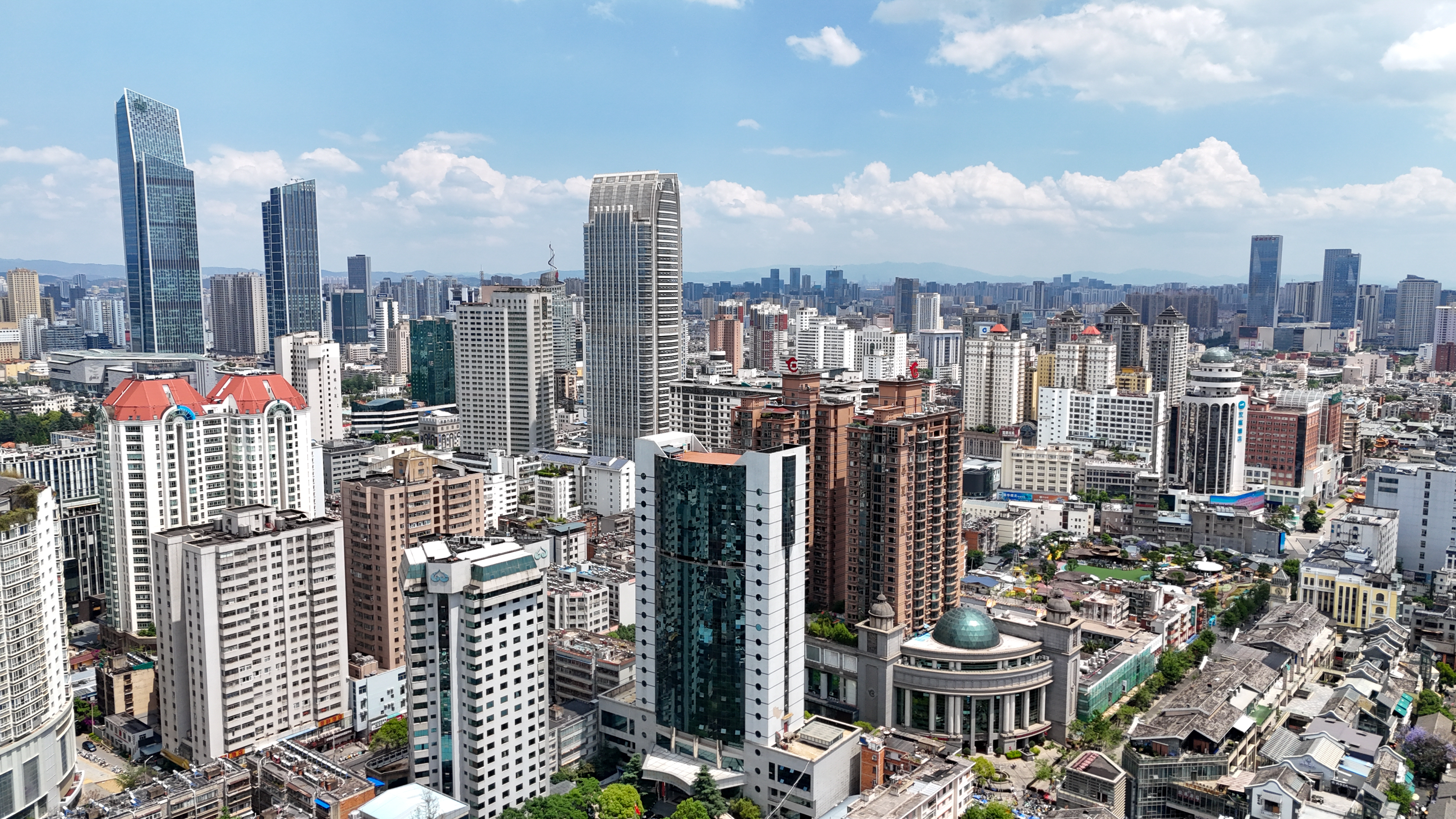
- A portion of Kunming's skyline in 2025
- Tallest building: Spring City 66 (2019)
- Tallest building height: 349 m (1,145 ft)
- First 150 m+ building: Kai Wah Plaza A (1999)

Number of tall buildings
- Taller than 150 m (492 ft): 31 (2025)
- Taller than 200 m (656 ft): 18 (2025)
- Taller than 300 m (984 ft): 3

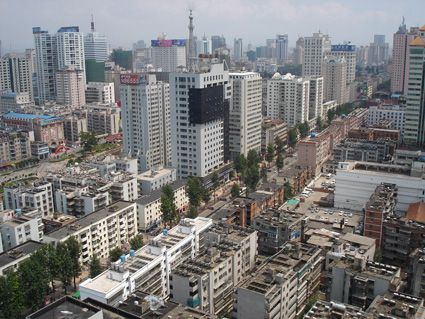
Kunming in 2009

This list of tallest buildings in Kunming ranks skyscrapers in the Chinese city of Kunming by height. Kunming is the capital and largest city of the province of Yunnan, with a population of over 8.4 million and an urban population of 5.2 million. It is a major economic and cultural hub in southwestern China.

Having built only two skyscrapers above 150 m before 2010, Kunming's skyline underwent a major boom starting from the early 2010s, continuing into the 2020s. As of 2026. Kunming is home to 32 skyscrapers that reach a height of 150 metres (492 feet); 18 of those are over the height of 200 metres (656 ft). It is the second largest skyline in southwestern China, after Nanning.

The tallest building in Kunming has been Spring City 66, an office building constructed in 2019 that reaches 349 m (1,145 ft) in height. It is one of Kunming's three supertall skyscrapers. The other two are twin skyscrapers that form the Fanya International Finance Building complex, also known as Kunming Xishan Wanda Plaza. Before that, the 150 m (492 ft) Kai Wah Plaza A dominated the skyline since its completion in 1999. Several projects for additional supertall skyscrapers have been put on hold, including the Kunming China Resources Center Office Building and the Dongfeng Plaza complex.

== Tallest buildings ==
This lists ranks completed skyscrapers in Kunming that stand at least 150 m (492 ft) tall as of October 2026, based on standard height measurement. This includes spires and architectural details but does not include antenna masts.

Was the tallest building in Kunming upon completion

Rank	Building	Image	Height	Floors	Use	Year	Notes
1	Spring City 66		349 m	61	Office	2019	
2	Fanya International Finance Building North		317.8 m	67	Office	2016	
3	Fanya International Finance Building South		317.8 m	66	Office	2016	
4	Kunming Rainbow Yunnan First City Tower 1		286 m	56	Office	2022	
5	Tongde Kunming Plaza		269 m	54	Mixed-use	2015	
6	Grand Hyatt Kunming		251 m	57	Mixed-use	2023	
7	Yowe Center		239 m	47	Office	2018	
8	CRECG Tower		226 m	40	Office	2022	
9	China Overseas International Center		220 m	43	Office	2022	
10	Kunming Iron and Steel Building		219.3 m	50	Mixed-use	2014	
11	Yonghe Plaza Tower A		218.9 m	48	Office	2023	
12	Yonghe Plaza Tower B		218.9 m	48	Office	2023	
13	Yuexiu Centre 1-1		212 m	47	Office	2024	
14	Harmonious Century Tower A		210 m	55	Office	2016	
15	Harmonious Century Tower B		210 m	55	Office	2016	
16	China Merchants Zhaoping Business Centre		204 m	46	Office	2024	
17	Haiyuan Fortune Center		203 m	41	Office	2020	
18	Dacheng Financial Business Center Tower A		200 m	46	Mixed-use	2019	
19	Dragon Building		186 m	47	Office	2013	
20	Kunming Century Square		180 m	43	Mixed-use	2008	
21	Yilong · Vientiane City		171 m	41	Office	2013	
22	Kunming Rainbow Yunnan First City Tower 2		171 m	35	Office	2022	
23	Wuhua Science & Innovation Building (Note: The CTBUH lists this building twice by mistake, as "Wuhua Science and Technology Buildings" and "Wuhua Science and Technology Tower 1")		170 m	Unknown	Office	2018	
24	South Asian First City A		168 m	36	Office	2012	
25	Office Building at Erji Road		168 m	32	Office	2015	
26	Yuntou Tower A		168 m	33	Office	2017	
27	Yuntou Tower B		168 m	33	Office	2017	
28	Star Fortune Center A		166 m	36	Office	2016	
29	Xanadu Building		150 m	40	Office	2016	
30	Kunlun Center		150 m	25	Office	2016	
31	Kai Wah Plaza A		150 m	37	Hotel	1999	

== Tallest under construction or proposed ==
=== Under construction ===
This lists ranks skyscrapers under construction in Kunming that are expected to be at least 150 m (492 ft) tall as of June 2025, based on standard height measurement. This includes spires and architectural details but does not include antenna masts.

Building	Image	Height	Floors	Use	Year	Notes
Longfor Times Financial Centre Tower 1	Kunming (CN)	270 m	TBD	Office	2025	
International Healthcare and Business City Hotel Tower	Kunming (CN)	218 m	54	Hotel	2026	
Zhongtong Business Centre	Kunming (CN)	201.8 m	TBD	Office	2025	
Longfor Times Financial Centre Tower 2	Kunming (CN)	200 m	TBD	Office	2025	
International Transport Hub Tower B	Kunming (CN)	195.2 m	45	Office	TBD	
