= Greenland Center, Xi'an =

Under-construction skyscraper in Xi'an, Shaanxi, China

China International Silk Road Center
- Interactive map of the China International Silk Road Center area

General information
- Status: On hold
- Type: Mixed use: Office; Science Lab; Education; Hospital; Scientific Retail; University; Hostel
- Location: Xi'an, Shaanxi, China
- Coordinates: 34°15′36″N 108°46′00″E
- Construction started: February 12, 2019
- Estimated completion: TBA

Height
- Architectural: 498 m (1,634 ft)
- Top floor: 465 m (1,526 ft)

Technical details
- Floor count: 101

Design and construction
- Architect: Skidmore, Owings & Merrill

The China International Silk Road Center (simplified Chinese: 西安绿地中心; traditional Chinese: 西安綠地中心, formerly Greenland Center) is a supertall skyscraper on-hold in Xi'an, Shaanxi, China. The original design called for a 501-meter (1,644 ft)-tall building, but the height was changed to 498 meters (1,634 ft) because of new skyscraper regulations in China. The skyscraper will be the tallest in Xi'an. It is being developed by Chinese developer Greenland Group.

== History ==
Construction began in 2019. The original planned height was 501 meters, but due to new regulations limiting the height of skyscrapers, it was changed to 270 meters.

== See also ==
- List of tallest buildings in China
