= Haitian Center Tower 2 =

Supertall skyscraper in Qingdao, Shandong, China

- 海天中心2号楼
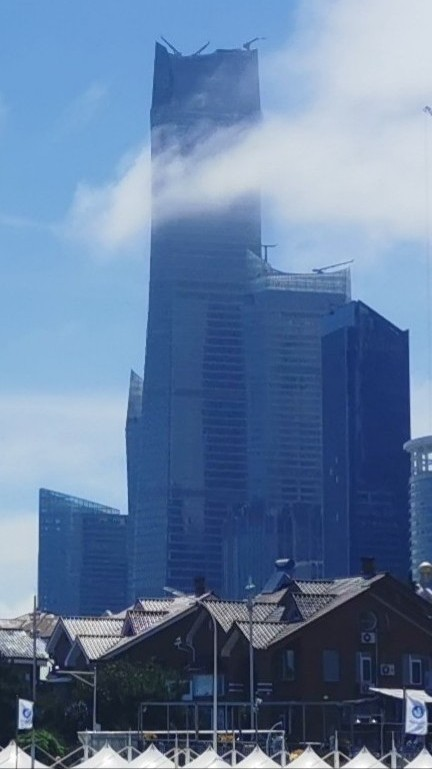
- Haitian Center Tower 2 in June 2021
- Interactive map of the Haitian Center Tower 2 area
- Alternative names: New Horizon Tower 2 Hai Tian Hotel Redevelopment

General information
- Status: Completed
- Type: Hotel / Office
- Location: No. 48 Xianggang West Road, Qingdao, China
- Coordinates: 36°3′23″N 120°21′53″E
- Construction started: August 2016
- Topped-out: 2020
- Completed: 2021
- Owner: Qingdao Conson Hai Tian Center Co., Ltd.

Height
- Architectural: 369 m (1,211 ft)
- Tip: 369 m (1,211 ft)
- Top floor: 342.9 m (1,125 ft)
- Observatory: 333.3 m (1,094 ft)

Technical details
- Floor count: 73 above ground 5 below ground
- Floor area: 111,400 m^{2} (1,199,100 sq ft)
- Lifts/elevators: 31

Design and construction
- Architect: Archilier Architecture
- Architecture firm: Archilier Architecture / CCDI Group
- Structural engineer: CCDI Group<
- Main contractor: China Construction Eighth Engineering Division

Other information
- Number of rooms: 233
- Parking: 2,123

Haitian Center Tower 2 (Chinese: 海天中心2号楼) is a skyscraper that architecturally topped out in 2020. Located in the Shinan District of Qingdao, China, it is the tallest building in Shandong Province, among the 50 tallest buildings in China, and among the 100 tallest buildings in the world.

== See also ==
- List of tallest buildings
