= List of tallest freestanding structures =

The Burj Khalifa is the tallest structure ever built, with a pinnacle height of 830 m (2722 ft) tall. The 20th and 21st centuries marked a notable uptick in terms of construction of tall structures. The majority of supertall structures are in Asia. Most of the tallest structures during that time period have been guyed masts, which are not considered freestanding as they require guy wires for support.

== List of heights ==
This list includes all freestanding structures of at least 350 meters or 1148 ft. Guyed structures or offshore structures do not count for the list. For all buildings, they are listed by pinnacle height and not architectural height, so the ranking will differ from the List of tallest buildings, such as the Willis Tower being above the Taipei 101. This list includes now demolished or destroyed structures, such as the original World Trade Center. The dates listed are when the structures topped out, not necessarily when they were finished.

Clear	Denotes structure that is or was once the tallest in the world

Clear	Denotes structure that has been destroyed

**Bold**	Denotes structure that is not a building

	Name	Height		Image	Town/City	Country	Year	Comments	Ref
	Name	m	ft	Image	Town/City	Country	Year	Comments	Ref
1	Burj Khalifa	828	2,717		Dubai	United Arab Emirates	2009	Tallest structure in the world since 2009	
2	Merdeka 118	680.5	2,233		Kuala Lumpur	Malaysia	2021	Tallest structure built in the 2020s	
3	**Tokyo Skytree**	634	2,080		Tokyo	Japan	2011	Tallest structure on an island; Tallest tower in the world since 2011; tallest structure built in the 2010s	
4	Shanghai Tower	632	2,073		Shanghai	China	2013	Tallest structure in China	
5	**Canton Tower**	602	1,975		Guangzhou	China	2009	Tallest tower in the world from 2009 to 2011	
6	Mecca Royal Clock Tower (Abraj al-Bait)	601	1,972		Mecca	Saudi Arabia	2011	Tallest clock tower and contains the highest museum in the world	
7	Ping An International Finance Centre	599.1	1,966		Shenzhen	China	2017	Tallest all-office building in the world	
8	Goldin Finance 117	597	1,959		Tianjin	China	2015	Topped out but unfinished; Tallest abandoned building in the world	
9	Lotte World Tower	554.64	1,820		Seoul	South Korea	2017	Tallest building in South Korea and the OECD	
10	**CN Tower**	553.33	1,815		Toronto	Canada	1975	Tallest freestanding structure in the world from 1975 to 2009; tallest freestanding structure in the Western Hemisphere; tallest freestanding structure built in the 20th century	
11	One World Trade Center (Freedom Tower)	546.2	1,792		New York City	United States	2013	Tallest freestanding structure in the United States	
12	**Ostankino Tower**	540.1	1,772		Moscow	Russia	1967	Tallest freestanding structure in the world from 1967 to 1975; Tallest freestanding structure in Russia and Europe; tallest freestanding structure built in the 1960s	
13	Guangzhou CTF Finance Centre	530	1,739		Guangzhou	China	2016		
13	Tianjin CTF Finance Centre	530	1,739		Tianjin	China	2019		
15	China Zun (CITIC Tower)	527.7	1,731		Beijing	China	2018		
16	Willis Tower (Sears Tower)	527	1,729		Chicago	United States	1973	Originally 520 meters (1,707 ft) prior to antenna extension in 2000	
17	1 World Trade Center (North Tower)	526.7	1,728		New York City	United States	1970	Destroyed in 2001; tallest freestanding structure to ever be destroyed	
18	Taipei 101	509.2	1,671		Taipei	Taiwan	2003		
19	Shanghai World Financial Center	494.3	1,622		Shanghai	China	2008		
20	International Commerce Centre	484	1,588		Hong Kong	Hong Kong	2010		
21	Wuhan Greenland Center	475.6	1,560		Wuhan	China	2022		
22	Central Park Tower	472.4	1,550		New York City	United States	2019	Tallest residential building	
23	Landmark 81	470.3	1,543		Ho Chi Minh City	Vietnam	2018	Tallest building in Vietnam	
24	**Oriental Pearl Tower**	468	1,535		Shanghai	China	1994	Tallest structure built in the 1990s	
25	Lakhta Center	462	1,516		St Petersburg	Russia	2018	Northernmost skyscraper in the world	
26	Chongqing International Trade and Commerce Center	458	1,503		Chongqing	China	2024		
27	875 North Michigan Avenue (John Hancock Center)	457	1,499		Chicago	United States	1968		
28	Zifeng Tower	453	1,486		Nanjing	China	2010		
29	Changsha IFS Tower T1	452	1,483		Changsha	China	2018		
30	Petronas Tower 1	451.9	1,483		Kuala Lumpur	Malaysia	1996	Tallest twin buildings	
30	Petronas Tower 2	451.9	1,483		Kuala Lumpur	Malaysia	1996	Tallest twin buildings	
32	Suzhou IFS	450	1,476		Suzhou	China	2019		
33	The Exchange 106	445.5	1,462		Kuala Lumpur	Malaysia	2019		
34	Empire State Building	443.2	1,454		New York City	United States	1930	Tallest structure in the world from 1930 to 1967	
35	Wuhan Center	443.1	1,454		Wuhan	China	2015		
36	KK100	442	1,450		Shenzhen	China	2011		
37	Guangzhou International Finance Center	438.6	1,439		Guangzhou	China	2010		
38	111 West 57th Street	435.3	1,428		New York City	United States	2019	Thinnest skyscraper in the world with a width-to-height ratio of about 1:24	
39	**Milad Tower**	435	1,427		Tehran	Iran	2007		
40	Shandong International Financial Center	428	1,404		Jinan	China	2025		
41	One Vanderbilt	427	1,401		New York City	United States	2019		
42	432 Park Avenue	425.5	1,396		New York City	United States	2014		
43	Marina 101	425	1,394		Dubai	United Arab Emirates	2017		
44	Trump Tower (Chicago)	423.1	1,388		Chicago	United States	2009	Commissioned by and named after Donald Trump	
45	270 Park Ave (JP Morgan Chase Building)	423	1,388		New York City	United States	2024		
46	Dongguan International Trade Center 1	422.6	1,386		Dongguan	China	2020		
47	**Kuala Lumpur Tower**	421	1,381		Kuala Lumpur	Malaysia	1994		
48	Jin Mao Tower	420.5	1,380		Shanghai	China	1999		
49	**GRES-2 Power Station**	419.7	1,377		Ekıbastūz	Kazakhstan	1987	Tallest freestanding structure built in the 1980s; Tallest chimney in the world	
50	Nanjing Financial City II	416.6	1,367		Nanjing	China	2024		
51	**Tianjin Tower**	415.2	1,362		Tianjin	China	1991		
52	2 World Trade Center (South Tower)	415	1,362		New York City	United States	1971	Destroyed in 2001	
53	Princess Tower	414	1,358		Dubai	United Arab Emirates	2012		
54	Al Hamra Tower	412.6	1,354		Kuwait City	Kuwait	2010		
55	Two International Finance Centre	412	1,352		Hong Kong	Hong Kong	1998		
56	Haeundae LCT The Sharp Landmark Tower	411.6	1,350		Busan	South Korea	2019		
57	Ningbo Central Plaza	409	1,342		Ningbo	China	2024		
58	**Central Radio & TV Tower**	405	1,329		Beijing	China	1992		
59	Guangxi China Resources Tower	403	1,322		Nanning	China	2020		
60	Guiyang International Financial Center Tower 1	401	1,316		Guiyang	China	2020		
61	23 Marina	395	1,296		Dubai	United Arab Emirates	2012		
62	Iconic Tower	393.8	1,292		New Administrative Capital	Egypt	2021	Tallest structure in Africa	
63	China Merchants Bank Tower	393	1,289		Shenzhen	China	2025		
64	China Resources Tower	392.5	1,288		Shenzhen	China	2016		
65	CITIC Plaza	391	1,283		Guangzhou	China	1996		
66	30 Hudson Yards	390	1,280		New York City	United States	2019		
67	Citymark Centre	388.3	1,274		Shenzhen	China	2022		
68	Shum Yip Upperhills Tower 1	388.1	1,273		Shenzhen	China	2020		
69	**Zhongyuan Tower**	388	1,273		Zhengzhou	China	2011		
69	Eton Place Dalian Tower 1	388	1,273		Dalian	China	2015		
71	**Kyiv TV Tower**	385	1,263		Kyiv	Ukraine	1973		
71	Public Investment Fund Tower	385	1,263		Riyadh	Saudi Arabia	2014		
73	Shun Hing Square	384	1,260		Shenzhen	China	1996		
74	Autograph Tower	382.9	1,256		Jakarta	Indonesia	2020	Tallest freestanding structure in the Southern Hemisphere.	
75	Burj Mohammed bin Rashid	382	1,253		Abu Dhabi	United Arab Emirates	2014		
76	**Inco Superstack**	381	1,250		Greater Sudbury	Canada	1972	Scheduled to be demolished by 2029	
77	Elite Residence	380.5	1,248		Dubai	United Arab Emirates	2012		
78	**Jintang-Cezi Overhead Powerline Link**	380	1,247		Jintang Island	China	2019		
79	85 Sky Tower	378	1,240		Kaohsiung	Taiwan	1997		
80	Riverview Plaza	376	1,234		Wuhan	China	2021		
81	Dabaihui Plaza	375.6	1,232		Shenzhen	China	2021		
82	Guangdong Business Center	375.5	1,232		Guangzhou	China	2025		
83	**Tashkent Tower**	375	1,230		Tashkent	Uzbekistan	1984		
84	Central Plaza	373.9	1,227		Hong Kong	Hong Kong	1992	Contains the highest church in the world	
85	Federation Tower (East Tower)	373.7	1,226		Moscow	Russia	2017		
86	Hengfeng Guiyang Center Tower 1	373.5	1,225		Guiyang	China	2025		
87	**Liberation Tower**	372	1,220		Kuwait City	Kuwait	1993		
88	**Almaty Tower**	371.5	1,219		Almaty	Kazakhstan	1983		
89	**Homer City Generating Station**	371	1,217		Center Township	United States	1977	Demolished in 2025; Tallest freestanding structure to be voluntarily demolished; Tallest freestanding structure not in a city	
90	Dalian International Trade Center	370.2	1,215		Dalian	China	2017		
91	**Kennecott Smokestack**	370	1,214		Magna	United States	1974		
91	**Beryozovskaya GRES Power Station**	370	1,214		Sharypovo	Russia	1985	Tallest currently standing structure not in a city	
91	**Zhoushan Island Overhead Pylon**	370	1,214		Zhoushan Island	China	2009		
91	Bank of America Tower	370	1,214		New York City	United States	2009		
91	The Boulevard	370	1,214		Dubai	United Arab Emirates	2017		
91	Xujiahui Tower	370	1,214		Shanghai	China	2025		
97	Haitian Center Tower 2	369	1,211		Qingdao	China	2020		
97	**Çamlıca Tower**	369	1,211		Istanbul	Turkey	2020		
99	**Riga Radio and TV Tower**	368.5	1,209		Riga	Latvia	1989		
100	Golden Eagle Tiandi Tower A	368.1	1,208		Nanjing	China	2019		
101	**Fernsehturm Berlin**	368	1,207		Berlin	Germany	1969		
102	**Mitchell Power Plant**	367.6	1,206		Moundsville	United States	1971		
103	Bank of China Tower	367.4	1,205		Hong Kong	Hong Kong	1990		
104	Ciel Tower	365.5	1,199		Dubai	United Arab Emirates	2025	Tallest hotel in the world	
105	St. Regis Chicago	365	1,198		Chicago	United States	2020	Tallest structure in the world designed by a woman	
106	Aon Center	362.5	1,189		Chicago	United States	1973		
107	**Trbovlje Power Station**	360	1,181		Trbovlje	Slovenia	1976		
107	Almas Tower	360	1,181		Dubai	United Arab Emirates	2008		
107	The Pinnacle	360	1,181		Guangzhou	China	2012		
107	Ping An Finance Center Tower 1	360	1,181		Jinan	China	2023		
111	Huiyun Center	359.2	1,178		Shenzhen	China	2025		
112	Hanking Center	358.9	1,177		Shenzhen	China	2018		
113	City Tower 1	358	1,175		Dubai	United Arab Emirates	2025		
113	Greenland Group Suzhou Center	358	1,175		Suzhou	China	2024		
115	Gevora Hotel	356.3	1,169		Dubai	United Arab Emirates	2017		
116	**Endesa Termic**	356	1,168		As Pontes de García Rodríguez	Spain	1974		
116	Il Primo Dubai	356	1,168		Dubai	United Arab Emirates	2021		
116	Galaxy World Tower 1	356	1,168		Shenzhen	China	2023		
116	Galaxy World Tower 2	356	1,168		Shenzhen	China	2023		
120	JW Marriott Marquis Dubai Tower 1	355.4	1,166		Dubai	United Arab Emirates	2012		
120	JW Marriott Marquis Dubai Tower 2	355.4	1,166		Dubai	United Arab Emirates	2013		
122	First Canadian Place	355	1,165		Toronto	Canada	1975		
123	Raffles City Chongqing T3N	354.5	1,163		Chongqing	China	2019		
123	Raffles City Chongqing T4N	354.5	1,163		Chongqing	China	2019		
125	OKO South Tower	354.1	1,162		Moscow	Russia	2015		
126	The Marina Torch	352	1,155		Dubai	United Arab Emirates	2011		
126	CBRT Tower	352	1,155		Istanbul	Turkey	2024	Tallest building in Europe outside of Russia	
126	**Changtai Yangtze River Bridge**	352	1,155		Jiangsu Province	China	2025	Tallest bridge columns in the world	
129	**Phoenix Copper Smelter**	351.5	1,153		Baia Mare	Romania	1995		
129	**Lotus Tower**	351.5	1,153		Colombo	Sri Lanka	2019		
131	Forum 66	351	1,152		Shenyang	China	2015		
132	**The Strat**	350.2	1,149		Las Vegas	United States	1995		
133	**Syrdarya Power Plant**	350	1,148		Shirin	Uzbekistan	1975		
133	Xi'an Glory International Financial Center	350	1,148		Xi'an	China	2021		

== Under construction ==
This section chronicles all structures under construction that will be at least 350 meters (1148 ft) tall upon completion

Name	Height		Town/City	Country	Estimated Year of Completion	Comments	Ref
Name	m	ft	Town/City	Country	Estimated Year of Completion	Comments	Ref
Jeddah Tower	1,008	3,307	Jeddah	Saudi Arabia	2028	Will become the tallest structure in the world upon completion	
Burj Azizi	725	2,379	Dubai	United Arab Emirates	2029		
Legends Tower	581	1,906	Oklahoma City	United States	2030	Surrounding complex has begun construction; will be the tallest in the Western Hemisphere upon completion	
Burj Binghatti Jacob & Co Residences	557	1,827	Dubai	United Arab Emirates	2027		
Senna Tower	544	1,785	Balneário Camboriú	Brazil	2030	Will be the tallest in the Southern Hemisphere upon completion	
Tiger Sky Tower	532	1,745	Dubai	United Arab Emirates	2029		
Pentominium	517	1,696	Dubai	United Arab Emirates	2028		
The Line	500	1,640	Neom	Saudi Arabia	2100	Will be the widest building in the world if completed	
Greenland Jinmao International Financial Center	499.8	1,640	Nanjing	China	2028		
HeXi Yuzui Tower A	498.8	1,636	Nanjing	China	2028		
Tianfu Center	489	1,604	Chengdu	China	2027		
Rizhao Center	485	1,591	Rizhao	China	2028		
Torre Rise	484	1,588	Monterrey	Mexico	2026		
Shanghai North Bund Center	480	1,575	Shanghai	China	2030		
Wuhan CTF Finance Centre	475	1,558	Wuhan	China	2029		
Suzhou CSC Fortune Center	470	1,542	Suzhou	China	2028		
Chengdu Greenland Tower	468	1,535	Chengdu	China	2029		
Marina 106	450	1,476	Dubai	United Arab Emirates	2027		
Tower Infinity	448	1,470	Incheon	South Korea	2029		
China Resources Land Center	436.1	1,431	Dongguan	China	2026		
Hainan Center	428	1,404	Haikou	China	2027		
Tour F	421	1,381	Abidjan	Ivory Coast	2026	Will become the tallest structure in Africa upon completion	

== Timeline of tallest structures ==
This section chronicles structures that at one point held the crown of the world's tallest freestanding structure, going as far back as the beginning of the common era.

Years as tallest	Name	Height		Image	City	Country	Year	Comments
Years as tallest	Name	m	ft	Image	City	Country	Year	Comments
2570 BCE - 1240 CE	Great Pyramid of Giza	146.6	481		Giza	Egypt	2570 BCE	Longest time spent as world's tallest man made structure, holding the record for 3,800 years; Height was reduced to 138.5 meters over time
1240-1311	Old St Paul's Cathedral	149	489		London	United Kingdom	1240	Central Spire burned down in 1561 and the rest of the church was demolished in 1666
1311-1549	Lincoln Cathedral	160	525		Lincoln	United Kingdom	1311	Central spire was destroyed in 1549
1549-1569	St. Mary's Church, Stralsund	151	495		Stralsund	Germany	1478	
1569-1573	Beauvais Cathedral	153	502		Beauvais	France	1569	Spire collapsed in 1573
1573-1647	St. Mary's Church, Stralsund	151	495		Stralsund	Germany	1478	Bell tower burned down in 1647
1647-1874	Strasbourg Cathedral	142	466		Strasbourg	France	1439	
1874-1876	Church of St Nicholas	147	482		Hamburg	Germany	1874	Main church building was destroyed in 1943
1876-1880	Rouen Cathedral	151	495		Rouen	France	1876	
1880-1884	Cologne Cathedral	157	515		Cologne	Germany	1880	
1884-1889	Washington Monument	169	554	fameless	Washington, D.C.	United States	1884	
1889-1929	Eiffel Tower	312	1,024		Paris	France	1889	First structure to surpass 300 meters tall; height was increased to 330 meters in 2022
1929-1930	Chrysler Building	319	1,047		New York City	United States	1929	First supertall skyscraper ever constructed
1930-1967	Empire State Building	443.2	1,454		New York City	United States	1930	First structure to surpass 400 meters tall; Was 381 meters tall prior to its antenna being installed in 1953
1967-1975	Ostankino Tower	540.1	1,772		Moscow	Russia	1967	First freestanding structure to surpass 500 meters tall
1975-2009	CN Tower	553.3	1,815		Toronto	Canada	1975	Tallest freestanding structure in North America and the Western Hemisphere; tallest freestanding structure built in the 20th century
2009-Present	Burj Khalifa	829.8	2,722		Dubai	United Arab Emirates	2009	First structure to surpass 800 meters tall; China's Canton Tower, which is taller than the CN Tower, completed earlier, but the Burj Khalifa was taller even before topping out

== Tallest structures by continent ==
Continent	Structure	Height		Topped Out	Country	City
Continent	Structure	m	ft	Topped Out	Country	City
Asia	Burj Khalifa	829.8	2,722	2009	United Arab Emirates	Dubai
North America	CN Tower	553.33	1,815	1975	Canada	Toronto
Europe	Ostankino Tower	540.1	1,772	1967	Russia	Moscow
Africa	Iconic Tower	393.8	1,292	2021	Egypt	New Administrative Capital
Oceania	Sky Tower	328	1,076	1997	New Zealand	Auckland
South America	Gran Torre Costanera	300	984	2012	Chile	Santiago
Antarctica	Long Duration Balloon Payload Preparation Buildings	15	49	2005	United States	

== Countries with most structures on list ==
Rank	Country	Number of structures on list	City(s) with most structures on list	Tallest structure	Height	
Rank	Country	Number of structures on list	City(s) with most structures on list	Tallest structure	m	ft
1	China	52	Shenzhen	Shanghai Tower	632	2,073
2	United States	20 (3 demolished)	New York	One World Trade Center	546.2	1,792
3	United Arab Emirates	15	Dubai	Burj Khalifa	829.8	2,722
4	Malaysia	5	Kuala Lumpur	Merdeka 118	680.5	2,233
4	Russia	5	Moscow	Ostankino Tower	540.1	1,772
6	Hong Kong	4	Hong Kong	International Commerce Centre	484	1,588
7	Canada	3	Toronto	CN Tower	553.33	1,815
8	Saudi Arabia	2	Mecca, Riyadh	The Clock Towers	601	1,972
8	South Korea	2	Seoul, Busan	Lotte World Tower	554.6	1,820
8	Taiwan	2	Taipei, Kaohsiung	Taipei 101	509.2	1,671
8	Kazakhstan	2	Ekıbastūz, Almaty	GRES-2 Power Station	419.7	1,377
8	Kuwait	2	Kuwait City	Al Hamra Tower	412.6	1,354
8	Uzbekistan	2	Tashkent, Shirin	Tashkent Tower	375	1,230
8	Turkey	2	Istanbul	Çamlıca Tower	369	1,211
15	Japan	1	Tokyo	Tokyo Skytree	634	2,080
15	Vietnam	1	Ho Chi Minh City	Landmark 81	470.3	1,543
15	Iran	1	Tehran	Milad Tower	435	1,427
15	Egypt	1	New Administrative Capital	Iconic Tower	393.8	1,292
15	Ukraine	1	Kyiv	Kyiv TV Tower	385	1,263
15	Indonesia	1	Jakarta	Autograph Tower	382.9	1,256
15	Latvia	1	Riga	Riga Radio and TV Tower	368.5	1,209
15	Germany	1	Berlin	Fernsehturm Berlin	368	1,207
15	Slovenia	1	Trbovlje	Trbovlje Power Station	360	1,181
15	Spain	1	As Pontes de García Rodríguez	Endesa Termic	356	1,168
15	Romania	1	Baia Mare	Phoenix Copper Smelter	351.5	1,153
15	Sri Lanka	1	Colombo	Lotus Tower	351.5	1,153

== See also ==
- List of tallest buildings
- List of tallest structures
- List of tallest statues
- History of the world's tallest buildings
- History of the world's tallest structures
- Tallest structures by category
- List of visionary tall buildings and structures
