= List of supertall skyscrapers =

List of buildings taller than 300 metres (980 feet)

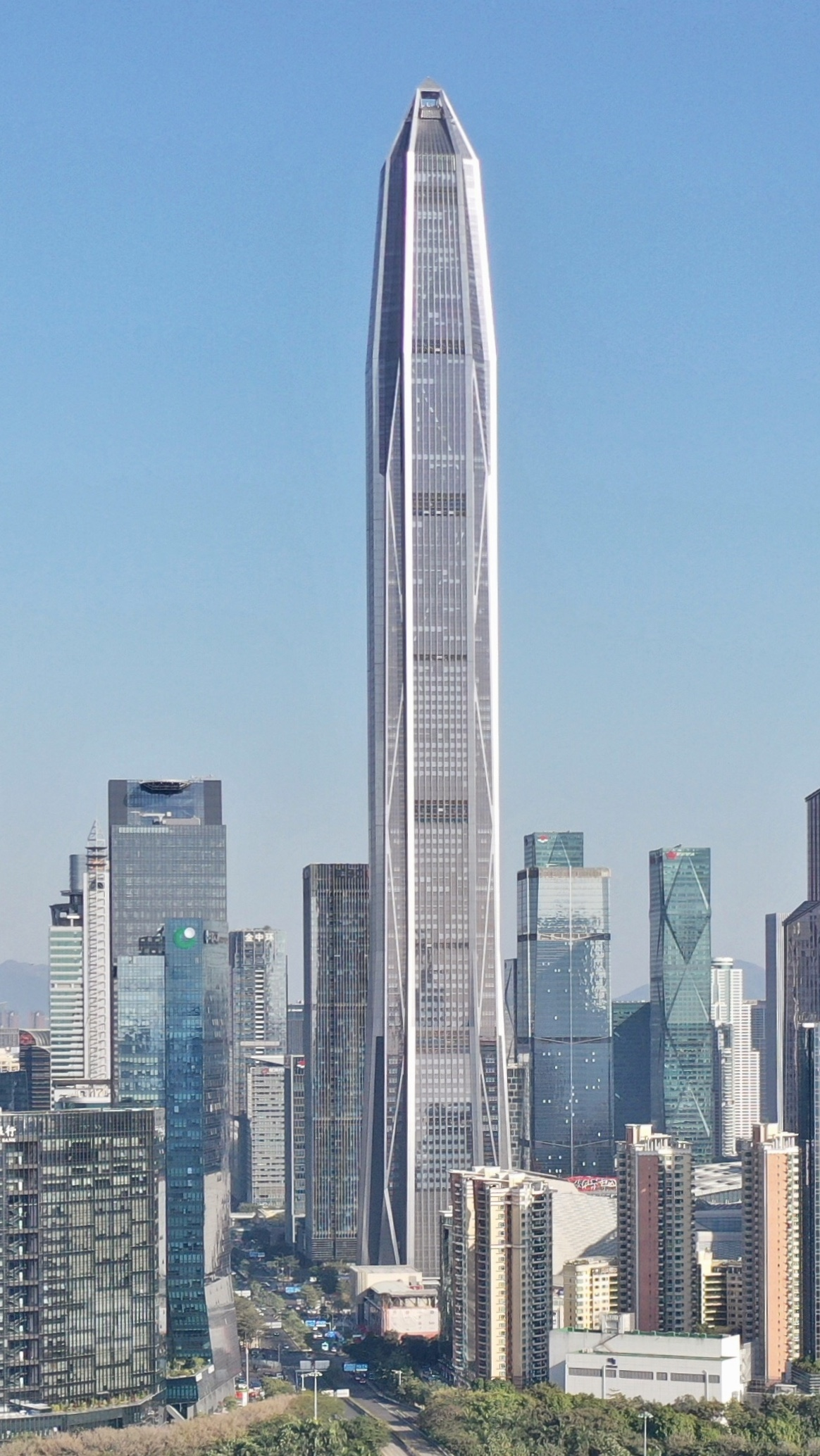
The 118-storey, 599 m (1,965 ft) Ping An Finance Centre in Shenzhen, China, is the tallest building in the 300–599 meter "supertall" class.

According to the Council on Vertical Urbanism (CVU), a supertall building is defined as a building between 300 and 599 m (984 and 1,965 ft) in height. Buildings taller than 600 m (2,000 ft) are called "megatall".

As of October 2026, there are 70 cities with at least one supertall or taller building, and 260 completed supertall or taller buildings. Most supertall skyscrapers are located in Asia. The city with the most supertall or taller buildings is Dubai at 33 entries, followed by Shenzhen and New York City with 22 and 18 respectively. China is the country with the most supertall or taller buildings at 138 entries, followed by the United Arab Emirates and the United States with 38 and 34 respectively.

== History ==
=== North America ===
The first supertall skyscraper to be completed was the Chrysler Building in New York City in 1930, which was 319 meters (1,047 feet) tall. This was followed a year later by the Empire State Building, which rose to a height of 381 meters (1,250 feet). No supertall buildings would be constructed for 38 years until the completion of the John Hancock Center in Chicago in 1969. The John Hancock Center was the first supertall to be built outside New York City. Supertalls remained the purview of New York City and Chicago until the completion of the JPMorgan Chase Tower in Houston. Two more American cities gained a supertall skyscraper in the 20th century: Atlanta with the Bank of America Plaza, and Los Angeles with the U.S. Bank Tower, both office buildings.

After the September 11 attacks, New York City was left with only two supertall buildings. This preceded a significant boom in the construction of supertall buildings, which began with The New York Times Building in 2007 and accelerated in the 2010s with the development of the Hudson Yards complex and residential supertall skyscrapers on Billionaires' Row. Currently, New York City has 17 supertall buildings, and 2 more under construction. In 2018, two more US cities gained their first supertall buildings: the Salesforce Tower in San Francisco, and the Comcast Technology Center in Philadelphia, and in 2025, Austin gained its first ever supertall building, Waterline. Construction is ongoing on Waldorf Astoria Miami, which would become the first supertall building in Miami.

Mexico is the only country besides the United States to have a supertall building in North America – T.Op Torre 1 in Monterrey, which was built in 2020. Torre Rise is currently under construction in the same city, which would become the tallest building in all of Latin America if completed. While Canada has no completed supertall buildings, it has three under construction – One Bloor West, Skytower at Pinnacle One Yonge, and Concord Sky, all of which are in Toronto.

=== Asia ===
The Bank of China Tower in Hong Kong was the first supertall skyscraper to be built outside of the United States in 1990. This preceded a rise in the construction of supertall skyscrapers internationally, which accelerated in the 2010s, especially in China.

East Asia has become a hotspot for building such tall skyscrapers. The first supertall buildings to be built in mainland China were CITIC Plaza in Guangzhou and Shun Hing Square in Shenzhen, both built in 1996. In the 2010s, China overtook the United States to become the country with the most supertall buildings. Other cities in China that have built multiple supertall buildings since 2000 include Guiyang, Nanjing, Nanning, Tianjin, and Wuhan. Taiwan completed its first supertall building, 85 Sky Tower, in the city of Kaohsiung in 1997. This was followed by Taipei 101 in Taiwan's capital of Taipei 7 years later, which became the tallest building in the world at the time. Japan and South Korea both constructed their first supertall buildings in the 2010s; Japan with Abeno Harukas in Osaka in 2014, and South Korea with the Northeast Asia Trade Tower in Incheon in 2012. In North Korea, construction of the Ryugyong Hotel in Pyongyang has been completed, but the hotel remains unopened as of 2026.

Baiyoke Tower II in Bangkok, Thailand became the first supertall building in Southeast Asia when it was completed in 1997. They were followed by the Petronas Towers in Kuala Lumpur, Malaysia in 1998, which overtook the Sears Tower as the tallest buildings in the world at the time, and the World Trade Center as the tallest twin towers in the world. Vietnam received its first supertall building in 2012 upon the completion of Landmark 72 in Hanoi. Likewise, Indonesia completed its first supertall building, Autograph Tower in 2022.

South Asia currently has only one supertall building, Lokhandwala Minerva in Mumbai, India, which was built in 2023.

=== Middle East ===
Dubai completed the Burj Al Arab hotel in 1999, the first supertall building in the United Arab Emirates and the Middle East. Saudi Arabia became the next country in the Middle East with a supertall building with the construction of the Kingdom Centre in 2002. Qatar completed its first supertall building, Aspire Tower, in 2007, while Kuwait completed its first supertall skyscraper, Arraya Tower, two years later. The Central Bank of the Republic of Turkey in Istanbul, currently under construction, will become the first supertall building in Turkey. Azrieli Spiral Tower in Tel Aviv and Beyond Tower in Givatayim, both in construction, will become the first supertall buildings in Israel.

=== Europe ===
Europe currently has nine supertall buildings, all completed since 2010. With the exception of The Shard in London, United Kingdom and Varso Tower in Poland, the remainder are in Russia–six in Moscow and one, the Lakhta Centre, in Saint Petersburg. All supertall buildings in Moscow are located in Moscow International Business Centre. The first of these was Moscow Tower in the City of Capitals complex, which was built in 2010. After Brexit, Varso Tower remains the only supertall building in the European Union.

=== Other locations ===
In Australia, supertall buildings have been built in Gold Coast and Melbourne, making Australia the only Oceanian country with supertall skyscrapers.

South America's sole supertall building is Gran Torre Costanera in Santiago, Chile. Similarly, Africa has only one supertall building, the Iconic Tower, located in Egypt's New Administrative Capital. Tour F, a supertall building in construction in Abidjan, Ivory Coast, will be the first such building in West Africa.

== Supertall skyscrapers ==
This list includes completed skyscrapers that stand between 300 and 599 m (984 and 1,965 ft) in height, based on standard height measurements. This includes spires and architectural details but does not include antenna masts. This list does not include topped out buildings that have not been fully completed.

This list does not include the four tallest buildings in the world: the Burj Khalifa, Merdeka 118, Shanghai Tower, and The Clock Towers, which are over 600 meters and classified as "megatall".

Architecturally topped out but not yet completed

Rank	Building	City	Country	Height (m)	Height (ft)	Floors	Year
1	Ping An Finance Center	Shenzhen	China	599	1,965	118	2017
2	Lotte World Tower	Seoul	South Korea	555	1,819	123	2017
3	One World Trade Center	New York City	United States	541.3	1,776	94	2014
4 =	Guangzhou CTF Finance Centre	Guangzhou	China	530	1,740	111	2016
4 =	Tianjin CTF Finance Centre	Tianjin	China	530	1,740	97	2019
6	China Zun	Beijing	China	527.7	1,731	109	2018
7	Taipei 101	Taipei	Taiwan	508	1,667	101	2004
8	Shanghai World Financial Center	Shanghai	China	492	1,614	101	2008
9	International Commerce Centre	Hong Kong	Hong Kong	484	1,588	108	2010
10	Wuhan Greenland Center	Wuhan	China	476	1,560	101	2023
11	Central Park Tower	New York City	United States	472.4	1,550	98	2020
12	Lakhta Center	St. Petersburg	Russia	462	1,515	87	2019
13	Landmark 81	Ho Chi Minh City	Vietnam	461	1,513	81	2018
14	International Land-Sea Center	Chongqing	China	458.2	1,503	98	2026
15	The Exchange 106	Kuala Lumpur	Malaysia	454	1,488	95	2019
16	Changsha IFS Tower T1	Changsha	China	452.1	1,483	94	2018
17 =	Petronas Tower 1	Kuala Lumpur	Malaysia	452	1,483	88	1998
17 =	Petronas Tower 2	Kuala Lumpur	Malaysia	452	1,483	88	1998
19 =	Zifeng Tower	Nanjing	China	450	1,476	66	2010
19 =	Suzhou IFS	Suzhou	China	450	1,476	95	2019
21	Wuhan Tower	Wuhan	China	443.1	1,454	88	2019
22	Willis Tower	Chicago	United States	442.1	1,451	108	1974
23	KK100	Shenzhen	China	442	1,449	100	2011
24	Guangzhou International Finance Center	Guangzhou	China	439	1,440	103	2010
25	111 West 57th Street	New York City	United States	435.3	1,428	84	2021
26	Greenland Shandong International Financial Center	Jinan	China	428	1,404	88	2026
27	One Vanderbilt	New York City	United States	427	1,401	59	2020
28	432 Park Avenue	New York City	United States	425.7	1,397	85	2015
29	Marina 101	Dubai	UAE	425	1,394	101	2017
30	Trump International Hotel and Tower	Chicago	United States	423.2	1,389	98	2009
31	JPMorgan Chase World Headquarters	New York City	United States	423	1,388	60	2025
32	Minying International Trade Center T2	Dongguan	China	422.6	1,386	85	2021
33	Jin Mao Tower	Shanghai	China	421	1,380	88	1999
34	Zijin Financial Building	Nanjing	China	416.6	1,367	88	2025
35	Princess Tower	Dubai	UAE	414	1,358	101	2012
36	Al Hamra Tower	Kuwait City	Kuwait	413	1,354	80	2011
37	2 International Finance Centre	Hong Kong	Hong Kong	412	1,352	88	2003
38	LCT Landmark Tower	Busan	South Korea	411.6	1,350	101	2019
39	Ningbo Central Plaza Tower 1	Ningbo	China	409	1,342	80	2025
40	Guangxi China Resources Tower	Nanning	China	402.7	1,321	86	2020
41	Guiyang International Financial Center Tower 1	Guiyang	China	401	1,316	79	2020
42	23 Marina	Dubai	UAE	395	1,296	89	2012
43	Iconic Tower	New Administrative Capital	Egypt	394	1,263	77	2024
44	China Merchants Bank Global Headquarters Main Tower	Shenzhen	China	393	1,289	77	2025
45	China Resources Headquarters	Shenzhen	China	392	1,286	67	2018
46	CITIC Plaza	Guangzhou	China	391	1,283	80	1997
47	Citymark Center	Shenzhen	China	388.3	1,273	70	2022
48	Shum Yip Upperhills Tower 1	Shenzhen	China	388.1	1,273	80	2020
49	30 Hudson Yards	New York City	United States	387.1	1,270	73	2019
50	PIF Tower	Riyadh	Saudi Arabia	385	1,263	72	2021
51	Shun Hing Square	Shenzhen	China	384	1,260	69	1996
52	Eton Place Dalian Tower 1	Dalian	China	383	1,257	80	2016
53	Autograph Tower	Jakarta	Indonesia	382.9	1,256	75	2022
54	Logan Century Center 1	Nanning	China	381.3	1,251	82	2018
55	Burj Mohammed Bin Rashid	Abu Dhabi	UAE	381.2	1,251	88	2014
56	Empire State Building	New York City	United States	381	1,250	102	1931
57	Elite Residence	Dubai	UAE	380.5	1,248	87	2012
58	Riverview Plaza (1 Corporate Avenue)	Wuhan	China	376	1,234	73	2021
59	Shenzhen Center	Shenzhen	China	375.6	1,232	70	2021
60	Guangdong Business Center	Guangzhou	China	375.5	1,232	60	2025
61	Central Plaza	Hong Kong	Hong Kong	373.9	1,227	78	1992
62	Federation Tower	Moscow	Russia	373.7	1,226	93	2016
63 =	Ciel Tower	Dubai	UAE	373.5	1,225	82	2024
63 =	Hengfeng Guiyang Center Tower 1	Guiyang	China	373.5	1,225	77	2026
65	Dalian International Trade Center	Dalian	China	370.2	1,214	86	2019
66 =	Address Boulevard	Dubai	UAE	370	1,214	73	2017
66 =	Xujiahui Center	Shanghai	China	370	1,214	67	2025
68	Qingdao Hai Tian Center	Qingdao	China	368.9	1,210	73	2021
69	Golden Eagle Tiandi Tower A	Nanjing	China	368.1	1,208	77	2019
70	Bank of China Tower	Hong Kong	Hong Kong	367	1,205	70	1990
71	Bank of America Tower	New York City	United States	365.8	1,200	55	2009
72	St. Regis Chicago	Chicago	United States	362.9	1,191	101	2020
73	City Tower One	Dubai	UAE	362.8	1,190	94	2026
74 =	Ping An Financial Center Tower	Jinan	China	360	1,181	62	2024
74 =	Almas Tower	Dubai	UAE	360	1,181	68	2008
76	Hanking Center	Shenzhen	China	358.9	1,177	65	2018
77	Greenland Group Suzhou Center	Suzhou	China	358	1,175	77	2026
78	Gevora Hotel	Dubai	UAE	356.2	1,169	75	2017
79 =	Galaxy Tower 1	Shenzhen	China	356	1,167	71	2023
79 =	Galaxy Tower 2	Shenzhen	China	356	1,167	71	2023
79 =	Il Primo Tower	Dubai	UAE	356	1,167	80	2023
82 =	JW Marriott Marquis Dubai Tower 1	Dubai	UAE	355.4	1,166	82	2012
82 =	JW Marriott Marquis Dubai Tower 2	Dubai	UAE	355.4	1,166	82	2013
84	Emirates Tower One	Dubai	UAE	354.6	1,163	54	2000
85 =	Raffles City Chongqing T3N	Chongqing	China	354.5	1,163	79	2019
85 =	Raffles City Chongqing T4N	Chongqing	China	354.5	1,163	74	2019
87	OKO: South Tower	Moscow	Russia	354.1	1,162	85	2015
88 =	CBRT Tower	Istanbul	Turkey	352	1,155	59	2024
88 =	The Marina Torch	Dubai	UAE	352	1,155	86	2011
90	SkyTower at Pinnacle One Yonge	Toronto	Canada	351.4	1,153	106	2026
91	Forum 66 Tower 1	Shenyang	China	350.6	1,150	68	2015
92	The Pinnacle	Guangzhou	China	350.3	1,149	60	2012
93	Xi'an Glory International Financial Center	Xi'an	China	350	1,148	75	2022
94	Spring City 66	Kunming	China	349	1,145	61	2019
95	85 Sky Tower	Kaohsiung	Taiwan	348	1,140	75	1997
96	Aon Center	Chicago	United States	346.3	1,136	83	1973
97	The Center	Hong Kong	Hong Kong	346	1,135	73	1998
98	Neva Towers 2	Moscow	Russia	345	1,132	79	2019
99	Xiamen Cross Strait Financial Centre	Xiamen	China	343.9	1,128	68	2025
100	John Hancock Center	Chicago	United States	343.7	1,128	100	1969
101	Shimao Global Finance Center	Changsha	China	343	1,125	74	2019
102	Four Seasons Place KLCC	Kuala Lumpur	Malaysia	342.5	1,124	75	2018
103	ADNOC Headquarters	Abu Dhabi	UAE	342	1,122	65	2015
104 =	One Shenzhen Bay Tower 7	Shenzhen	China	341 m	1,120	71	2018
104 =	Mercedes-Benz Places Binghatti	Dubai	UAE	341	1,119	71	2026
106 =	LCT Residence Tower A	Busan	South Korea	339	1,112	85	2019
106 =	Comcast Technology Center	Philadelphia	United States	339	1,112	60	2018
106 =	YunDing Tower	Jinan	China	339	1,112	69	2020
106 =	Wuxi International Finance Square	Wuxi	China	339	1,112	68	2014
106 =	Hilton Wenzhou City Center	Wenzhou	China	339	1,111	71	2024
111	Chongqing World Financial Center	Chongqing	China	338.9	1,112	72	2015
112	Mercury City Tower	Moscow	Russia	338.8	1,112	75	2013
113	SO/ Sofitel Residences	Kuala Lumpur	Malaysia	338.6	1,111	84	2025
114 =	Suning Plaza Tower 1	Zhenjiang	China	338	1,109	75	2018
114 =	Tianjin Modern City Office Tower	Tianjin	China	338	1,109	72	2016
116	Hengqin International Finance Center	Zhuhai	China	337.7	1,108	69	2020
117	Tianjin World Financial Center	Tianjin	China	336.9	1,105	75	2011
118	Wilshire Grand Center	Los Angeles	United States	335.3	1,100	73	2017
119	SLS Dubai	Dubai	UAE	335.2	1,101	75	2020
120	DAMAC Heights	Dubai	UAE	335.1	1,099	88	2018
121 =	Twin Towers Guiyang, East Tower	Guiyang	China	335	1,099	74	2020
121 =	Twin Towers Guiyang, West Tower	Guiyang	China	335	1,099	74	2020
123	Shengjing Finance Plaza T2	Shenyang	China	334.3	1,097	68	2026
124	Uptown Tower	Dubai	UAE	333.4	1,094	78	2022
125	Shimao International Plaza	Shanghai	China	333.3	1,094	60	2006
126	LCT Residential Tower B	Busan	South Korea	333.1	1,093	83	2019
127 =	Parc1 Tower 1	Seoul	South Korea	333	1,093	69	2020
127 =	The A-Tower	Dubai	UAE	333	1,093	65	2021
127 =	Rose Rayhaan by Rotana	Dubai	UAE	333	1,093	71	2007
127 =	Shenzhen Urban Construction & Tower	Shenzhen	China	333	1,093	72	2024
131	Modern Media Center	Changzhou	China	332	1,089	57	2013
132	The Address Residence - Fountain View III	Dubai	UAE	331.8	1,087	77	2019
133 =	Regalia	Dubai	UAE	331	1,086	70	2026
133 =	Minsheng Bank Building	Wuhan	China	331	1,086	68	2008
135 =	China World Trade Center Tower 3	Beijing	China	330	1,083	74	2010
135 =	Yuexiu Global Financial Center	Wuhan	China	330	1,083	68	2025
135 =	Yuexiu Fortune Center 1	Wuhan	China	330	1,083	68	2017
135 =	Wuhan Yangtze River Shipping Center	Wuhan	China	330	1,083	65	2023
135 =	Guangxi Financial Investment Center	Nanning	China	330	1,083	67	2021
135 =	Jiulong Lake Knowledge Tower	Guangzhou	China	330	1,083	53	2026
135 =	Golden Corridor 22-1 Project Tower 1	Shenyang	China	330	1,083	71	2026
142	Hon Kwok City Center	Shenzhen	China	329.4	1,081	80	2017
143	Three World Trade Center	New York City	United States	328.9	1,079	69	2018
144	Zhuhai Tower	Zhuhai	China	328.8	1,079	66	2017
145 =	Qingdao Landmark Tower 1	Qingdao	China	328.6	1,278	74	2026
145 =	Keangnam Hanoi Landmark Tower	Hanoi	Vietnam	328.6	1,078	72	2012
147 =	Al Yaqoub Tower	Dubai	UAE	328	1,076	69	2013
147 =	Wuxi Suning Plaza 1	Wuxi	China	328	1,076	67	2014
147 =	Baoneng Shenyang Global Financial Centre Tower 2	Shenyang	China	328	1,076	80	2027
147 =	Longxi International Hotel	Huaxi Village	China	328	1,076	72	2011
147 =	Golden Eagle Tiandi Tower B	Nanjing	China	328	1,076	60	2019
152 =	Xiangjiang Fortune Finance Center Tower 1	Changsha	China	327	1,073	65	2020
152 =	Huaqiang Golden Corridor City Plaza Main Tower	Shenyang	China	327	1,073	66	2023
154	Deji World Trade Center Tower 1	Nanjing	China	326.5	1,071	68	2022
155	Salesforce Tower	San Francisco	United States	326.1	1,070	61	2018
156	The Index	Dubai	UAE	326	1,070	80	2010
157	CITIC Pacific Plaza	Jinan	China	326	1,070	64	2026
158	Azabudai Hills Mori JP Tower	Tokyo	Japan	325.2	1,067	64	2023
159	The Brooklyn Tower	New York City	United States	324.9	1,066	74	2024
160 =	The Landmark	Abu Dhabi	UAE	324	1,063	72	2013
160 =	Deji Plaza Phase 2	Nanjing	China	324	1,063	62	2013
162 =	Mr. C. Residences Downtown	Dubai	UAE	323	1,060	72	2026
162 =	Yantai Shimao No.1 The Harbour	Yantai	China	323	1,060	59	2017
164	Q1	Gold Coast	Australia	322.5	1,058	78	2005
151	Wenzhou World Trade Center	Wenzhou	China	321.9	1,056	68	2011
165 =	Burj Al Arab	Dubai	UAE	321	1,053	56	1999
165 =	Guangxi Finance Plaza	Nanning	China	321	1,053	68	2017
167	Heartland 66 Office Tower	Wuhan	China	320.7	1,052	59	2020
168	Nina Tower	Hong Kong	Hong Kong	320.4	1,051	80	2006
169	53 West 53	New York City	United States	320.1	1,050	77	2019
170 =	Huijin Center 1	Guangzhou	China	320	1,050	69	2022
170 =	Junchao Plaza	Guangzhou	China	320	1,050	67	2025
170 =	Zhangjiang Science Gate Tower 1	Shanghai	China	320	1,050	60	2024
170 =	Zhangjiang Science Gate Tower 2	Shanghai	China	320	1,050	60	2024
170 =	Guangzhou International Cultural Center	Guangzhou	China	320	1,050	54	2026
170 =	Palais Royale	Mumbai	India	320	1050	88	2026
170 =	Sinar Mas Center 1	Shanghai	China	320	1,050	65	2017
177	New York Times Building	New York City	United States	319	1,047	52	2007
178 =	Chrysler Building	New York City	United States	318.9	1,047	77	1930
178 =	Global City Square	Guangzhou	China	318.9	1,046	67	2016
180	China Resources Metropolitan City Center Landmark Tower	Wenzhou	China	318.2	1,044	60	2025
181	Meixi Lake Changsha Jinmao Building	Changsha	China	318.1	1,044	62	2024
182 =	Metrobank Center	Taguig	Philippines	318	1,043	66	2016
182 =	Magnolia Waterfront Residences	Bangkok	Thailand	318	1,043	70	2018
182 =	Jiuzhou International Tower	Nanning	China	318	1,043	71	2017
185 =	Fanya International Finance Building North	Kunming	China	317.8	1,043	67	2016
185 =	Fanya International Finance Building South	Kunming	China	317.8	1,043	67	2016
187	Blue Tower	Dubai	UAE	317.6	1,042	72	2010
188	Hong Plaza Main Tower (CBD Central Plaza)	Jinan	China	317	1,040	62	2026
189	Australia 108	Melbourne	Australia	316.7	1,039	100	2020
190	Chongqing IFS T1	Chongqing	China	316.3	1,038	63	2016
191	Jumeirah Nanjing Hotel & International Youth Cultural Centre Tower 2	Nanjing	China	315	1,033	67	2015
192	The Spiral	New York City	United States	314.2	1,031	66	2022
193	King Power MahaNakhon	Bangkok	Thailand	314	1,030	79	2016
193 =	Honglou Times Square	Lanzhou	China	313	1,027	56	2018
195 =	TEDA IFC	Tianjin	China	313	1,027	56	2026
196	Waterline	Austin	United States	312.4	1,025	74	2026
197	Bank of America Plaza	Atlanta	United States	311.8	1,023	55	1992
198	Shenzhen Bay Innovation and Technology Centre 1	Shenzhen	China	311.1	1,021	69	2020
199 =	Poly Pazhou C2	Guangzhou	China	311	1,020	65	2011
199 =	Moi Center	Shenyang	China	311	1,020	75	2014
201 =	Abu Dhabi Plaza	Astana	Kazakhstan	310.8	1,020	75	2022
201 =	Guangxi Wealth Financial Center	Nanning	China	310.8	1,020	70	2019
203	U.S. Bank Tower	Los Angeles	United States	310.3	1,018	72	1990
204 =	Varso	Warsaw	Poland	310	1,018	53	2022
204 =	Menara Telekom	Kuala Lumpur	Malaysia	310	1,017	55	2001
204 =	Hengyu Jinrong Center Block A	Shenzhen	China	310	1,017	66	2026
204 =	Ocean Heights	Dubai	UAE	310	1,017	82	2010
204 =	Greenland Center 1	Hangzhou	China	310	1,017	67	2023
204 =	Greenland Center 2	Hangzhou	China	310	1,017	67	2023
210 =	The Shard	London	United Kingdom	309.6	1,016	73	2013
210 =	Pearl River Tower	Guangzhou	China	309.6	1,015	71	2013
212	CCCC Southern Financial Investment Building	Zhuhai	China	309.5	1,015	65	2021
213	Fortune Center	Guangzhou	China	309.4	1,015	68	2015
214	Jumeirah Emirates Towers Hotel	Dubai	UAE	309	1,014	56	2000
215	Eurasia	Moscow	Russia	308.9	1,013	72	2014
216	One Bloor West	Toronto	Canada	308.6	1,012	85	2028
217	Beyond Office Tower	Giv'atayim	Israel	308.3	1,011	72	2026
218 =	Changsha IFS Tower T2	Changsha	China	308	1,010	63	2018
218 =	Guangfa Securities Headquarters	Guangzhou	China	308	1,010	58	2018
220	Burj Rafal	Riyadh	Saudi Arabia	307.9	1,010	68	2014
221	Nanshan Science and Technology Union Building	Shenzhen	China	307.2	1,013	67	2026
222 =	Amna Tower	Dubai	UAE	307	1,007	75	2020
222 =	Noora Tower	Dubai	UAE	307	1,007	75	2019
224	Franklin Center	Chicago	United States	306.9	1,007	60	1989
225 =	Zhongtian Future Ark Global Valley Tower 5	Guiyang	China	306.4	1,005	62	2027
225 =	Cayan Tower	Dubai	UAE	306.4	1,005	73	2013
227	One57	New York City	United States	306.1	1,004	75	2014
228	East Pacific Center Tower A	Shenzhen	China	306	1,005	85	2013
229	JPMorgan Chase Tower	Houston	United States	305.4	1,002	75	1982
230	Etihad Tower 2	Abu Dhabi	UAE	305.3	1,002	80	2011
231 =	Northeast Asia Trade Tower	Incheon	South Korea	305	1,001	68	2011
231 =	T.Op Torre 1	Monterrey	Mexico	305	1,001	64	2020
231 =	International Trade Center	Zhongshan	China	305	1,001	65	2019
234 =	520 Fifth Avenue	New York City	United States	304.8	1,000	76	2026
234 =	35 Hudson Yards	New York City	United States	304.8	1,000	72	2019
236	Shenzhen CFC Changfu Centre	Shenzhen	China	304.3	998	68	2015
237	Baiyoke Tower II	Bangkok	Thailand	304	997	85	1997
238	Wuxi Maoye City	Wuxi	China	303.8	997	68	2014
239	One Manhattan West	New York City	United States	303.6	996	67	2019
240	Two Prudential Plaza	Chicago	United States	303.3	995	64	1990
241 =	Suzhou ICC	Suzhou	China	303.2	995	68	2025
241 =	Guangdong Landmark Building	Shenzhen	China	303.2	995	62	2023
243 =	Diwang International Fortune Center	Liuzhou	China	303	994	72	2015
243 =	Greenland Puli Center	Jinan	China	303	994	61	2014
243 =	Jiangxi Nanchang Greenland Central Plaza, Parcel A	Nanchang	China	303	994	59	2015
243 =	Jiangxi Nanchang Greenland Central Plaza, Parcel B	Nanchang	China	303	994	59	2015
243 =	KAFD World Trade Center	Riyadh	Saudi Arabia	303	994	67	2021
248	Leatop Plaza	Guangzhou	China	302.7	993	64	2012
249	The Assima Tower	Kuwait City	Kuwait	302.5	992	65	2023
250	Wells Fargo Plaza	Houston	United States	302.4	992	71	1983
251	Kingdom Centre	Riyadh	Saudi Arabia	302.3	992	41	2002
252	The Address	Dubai	UAE	302.2	991	63	2008
253 =	Gate of the Orient	Suzhou	China	301.8	990	66	2015
253 =	City of Capitals: Moscow Tower	Moscow	Russia	301.8	990	76	2010
255	One Za'abeel The Tower	Dubai	UAE	301.4	989	68	2023
256	Luminary Tower	Jakarta	Indonesia	301.2	988	64	2023
257 =	Lokhandwala Minerva	Mumbai	India	301	989	78	2023
257 =	The Address Beach Resort	Dubai	UAE	301	988	77	2020
259	Shenzhen Zhongzhou Holdings Financial Center	Shenzhen	China	300.8	987	61	2015
260 =	Lusail Plaza Tower 3	Doha	Qatar	300.7	986	64	2023
260 =	Lusail Plaza Tower 4	Doha	Qatar	300.7	986	64	2023
262	Wasl Tower	Dubai	UAE	300.6	986	64	2024
263 =	Doosan Haeundae We've the Zenith Tower A	Busan	South Korea	300	984	80	2011
263 =	Huachuang International Plaza Tower 1	Changsha	China	300	984	66	2017
263 =	Gran Torre Santiago	Santiago	Chile	300	984	64	2013
263 =	Greenland Bund Centre Tower 1	Shanghai	China	300	984	64	2025
263 =	NBK Tower	Kuwait City	Kuwait	300	984	61	2019
263 =	Abeno Harukas	Osaka	Japan	300	984	59	2014
263 =	Jiefangbei Book City	Chongqing	China	300	984	63	2025
263 =	Arraya Tower	Kuwait City	Kuwait	300	984	60	2009
263 =	OCT Tower	Shenzhen	China	300	984	60	2020
263 =	Golden Eagle Tiandi Tower C	Nanjing	China	300	984	58	2019
263 =	Yangzhou Keyne Center	Yangzhou	China	300	984	60	2026
263 =	ICC Thang Long Global Center	Fuzhou	China	300	984	57	2019
263 =	Aspire Tower	Doha	Qatar	300	984	36	2007

== Supertall skyscrapers under construction ==
This list includes skyscrapers under construction that are planned to be between 300 and 600 meters (980 and 1,970 ft) tall. based on standard height measurements. The "year" column indicates the expected year of completion. This list does not include buildings whose construction has been suspended indefinitely, which are listed in the "On Hold" table below.

Indicates buildings that have been structurally topped out

Building	City	Country	Height (m)	Height (ft)	Height at the top completed (m/ft)	Floors	Year
Goldin Finance 117	Tianjin	China	596.6	1,957	596.6 m (1,957 ft)	128	2027
Burj Binghatti Jacob & Co Residences	Dubai	UAE	557	1,827	271 m (889 ft)	105	2027
Senna Tower	Balneário Camboriú	Brazil	550	1,804	0 m (0 ft)	154	2030
Tiger Sky Tower	Dubai	UAE	532	1,725	0 m (0 ft)	116	2029
Six Senses Residences Dubai Marina (Pentominium)	Dubai	UAE	517	1,696	147 m (482 ft)	122	2028
HeXi Yuzui Tower A	Nanjing	China	498.8	1,636	0 m (0 ft)	85	2028
Panda Tower - Tianfu Center	Chengdu	China	488.9	1,604	305.8 m (1,003 ft)	95	2027
Torre Rise	Monterrey	Mexico	484	1,588	371.4 m (1,219 ft)	88	2027
North Bund Tower	Shanghai	China	480	1,575	114.2 m (375 ft)	97	2030
Wuhan CTF Finance Center	Wuhan	China	475	1,558	3 m (9.8 ft)	84	2029
Chengdu Greenland Tower	Chengdu	China	468	1,535	440 m (1,440 ft)	101	2029
Suzhou CSC Fortune Center	Suzhou	China	460	1,509	82 m (269 ft)	100	2028
China Resources Land Center	Dongguan	China	450	1,476	12 m (39 ft)	94	2028
Aeternias Tower (Marina 106)	Dubai	UAE	450	1,476	341.6 m (1,121 ft)	106	2027
DWTN Residences	Dubai	UAE	445	1,460	0 m (0 ft)	110	2030
Hainan Center Tower 1	Haikou	China	428	1,404	406.3 m (1,333 ft)	94	2027
Tour F	Abidjan	Ivory Coast	421	1,381	334 m (1,096 ft)	75	2026
Tsingshan Holdings Group Global Headquarters Tower 1	Wenzhou	China	418	1,371	0 m (0 ft)	?	?
Luohu Friendship Trading Centre	Shenzhen	China	407	1,335	407 m (1,335 ft)	83	2026
Mukaab	Riyadh	Saudi Arabia	400	1,312	0 m (0 ft)	70	2040
Wildberries Bagration Bridge Tower	Moscow	Russia	400	1,312	0 m (0 ft)	75	2030
Great River Center	Wuhan	China	400	1,312	400 m (1,300 ft)	82	2026
Shenzhen Bay Super Headquarters Base Tower C-1	Shenzhen	China	400	1,312	384.7 m (1,262 ft)	78	2027
Hangzhou West Railway Station Hub Tower 1	Hangzhou	China	399.8	1,312	0 m (0 ft)	83	?
China Merchants Group West Headquarters	Chengdu	China	396	1,299	0 m (0 ft)	82	2028
Shenzhen Bay Financial Center Tower	Shenzhen	China	394.4	1,294	46.1 m (151 ft)	81	2029
Lucheng Square	Wenzhou	China	389	1,276	385.2 m (1,264 ft)	75	2028
Shenyang International Center Tower 1	Shenyang	China	388	1,273	40 m (130 ft)	75	2027
Torch Tower	Tokyo	Japan	385	1,263	52.5 m (172 ft)	62	2028
First Iraq Tower	Baghdad	Iraq	380	1,247	0 m (0 ft)	80	2028
One	Moscow	Russia	379	1,243	0 m (0 ft)	90	2030
Muraba Veli	Dubai	UAE	379	1,242	0 m (0 ft)	73	?
China Merchants Prince Bay Tower	Shenzhen	China	374	1,227	374 m (1,227 ft)	59	2028
Bayz101	Dubai	UAE	363	1,191	0 m (0 ft)	108	2028
Bayz102	Dubai	UAE	362	1,188	0 m (0 ft)	103	2029
Taipei Twin Towers - Tower 1	Taipei	Taiwan	360	1,181	150.1 m (492 ft)	70	2027
Bay Area Smart Plaza Tower A	Shenzhen	China	358.1	1,175	358.1 m (1,175 ft)	65	2027
Binghatti Skyblade	Dubai	UAE	357	1,171	40.3 m (132 ft)	66	2027
Guohong Center	Wenzhou	China	356	1,168	205.7 m (675 ft)	71	2028
Wynn Al Marjan Island Resort	Ras Al Khaimah	UAE	352	1,155	352 m (1,155 ft)	72	2027
Trump International Hotel and Tower Dubai	Dubai	UAE	350	1,148	0 m (0 ft)	80	2031
Ethiopian Electric Power Headquarters	Addis Ababa	Ethiopia	348	1,142	0 m (0 ft)	66	2027
Rixos Financial Center Road Dubai Residences	Dubai	UAE	347.8	1,141	0 m (0 ft)	87	2027
Al Habtoor Tower	Dubai	UAE	345	1,132	345 m (1,132 ft)	82	2026
Busan Lotte Tower	Busan	South Korea	343	1,124	46.2 m (152 ft)	67	2028
Dau House	Moscow	Russia	340	1,115	65.8 m (216 ft)	87	?
Safa Two de Grisogono	Dubai	UAE	340	1,115	125.3 m (411 ft)	85	2027
Zhonghai City Plaza	Tianjin	China	339.9	1,115	339.9 m (1,115 ft)	75	2026
Shenzhen Bay Super Headquarters Base Tower C-2	Shenzhen	China	336	1,102	324.6 m (1,065 ft)	68	2027
Guangjian Financial Center	Guangzhou	China	333	1,093	0 m (0 ft)	?	2027
Green Energy Superblock Oasis Central Sudirman Tower 2	Jakarta	Indonesia	331	1,086	99.9 m (328 ft)	75	2028
740 8th Avenue (The Torch)	New York City	United States	325.1	1,067	120.4 m (395 ft)	52	2027
Highwealth Huiguo 90	Taichung	Taiwan	323	1,060	56 m (184 ft)	63	2028
Azrieli Spiral Tower	Tel Aviv	Israel	323	1,060	269.3 m (884 ft)	91	2027
Cipriani Tower	Baku	Azerbaijan	323	1,060	0 m (0 ft)	65	2030
Sumou Tower 1	Jeddah	Saudi Arabia	322	1,056	293 m (961 ft)	70	2026
Jiangbei New Financial Center Phase I	Nanjing	China	320	1,050	0 m (0 ft)	63	2027
J-Tower 3	Phrom Phong	Cambodia	320	1,050	0 m (0 ft)	77	2029
Goldfinger Tower A	Hangzhou	China	320	1,050	320 m (1,050 ft)	61	2026
Mong Kok East Station Redevelopment - Tower 2	Hong Kong	Hong Kong	320	1,050	0 m (0 ft)	70	2027
Taihu Lake Main Landmark Tower	Huzhou	China	318	1,043	318 m (1,043 ft)	66	2026
Waldorf Astoria Hotel and Residences Miami	Miami	United States	317.3	1,041	258.4 m (848 ft)	98	2028
Como Residences	Dubai	UAE	317	1,040	81.7 m (268 ft)	75	2027
CIIC Financial Center Tower 1	Shenzhen	China	312	1,024	312 m (1,024 ft)	62	2026
Sugee Empire Tower	Mumbai	India	311	1,021	0 m (0 ft)	66	?
Slava 5 Tower	Moscow	Russia	310	1,018	0 m (0 ft)	65	2030
Aradhya Avan	Mumbai	India	306.6	1,006	116.3 m (382 ft)	80	2028
Indonesia-1 North Tower	Jakarta	Indonesia	306	1,004	306 m (1,004 ft)	63	2027
Skywaters Residences	Singapore	Singapore	305	1,001	0 m (0 ft)	63	2028
Tuwaiq Traditional Tower	Riyadh	Saudi Arabia	305	1,001	294.3 m (966 ft)	51	2027
Indonesia-1 South Tower	Jakarta	Indonesia	304	996	304 m (997 ft)	63	2027
Cypress Palms	Gold Coast	Australia	303	995	0 m (0 ft)	92	2028
Concord Sky	Toronto	Canada	300.2	985	200 m (660 ft)	85	2027
Goldfinger Tower B	Hangzhou	China	300	984	300 m (980 ft)	68	2026
Hangzhou West Railway Station Hub Tower 7	Hangzhou	China	300	984	0 m (0 ft)	68	?
Parus	Yekaterinburg	Russia	300	984	0 m (0 ft)	75	2031
Cipriani Ocean Resort & Club Residences	Punta del Este	Uruguay	300	984	0 m (0 ft)	75	2029
China Fortune Land Center	Guangzhou	China	300	984	0 m (0 ft)	?	?

== Supertall skyscrapers on hold ==
This list includes unfinished buildings with no construction activity that were planned to be supertall skyscrapers. The height column indicates the intended height.

Building	City	Country	Height (m)	Height (ft)	Floors	Construction began	Construction stopped	Notes
Doha Tower and Convention Center	Doha	Qatar	560	1,840	112	2007	2010	
Dalian Greenland Center	Dalian	China	518	1,699	88	2014	2018	
Evergrande Hefei Center T1	Hefei	China	518	1,699	112	2016	2020	
Qatar National Bank Tower	Doha	Qatar	510	1,670	101	2009	2010	cancelled in 2023
The Line	Neom	Saudi Arabia	500	1,640	?	2021	2025	
Greenland Jinmao International Financial Center	Nanjing	China	499.8	1,640	102	2019	2022	
Suzhou Zhongnan Center	Suzhou	China	499.2	1,638	103	2020	2023	
China International Silk Road Center	Xi'an	China	498	1,634	101	2019	2023	
Al Quds Endowment Tower	Doha	Qatar	495	1,624	100	2009	2010	cancelled in 2019
Rizhao Center	Rizhao	China	485	1,591	94	2021	2024	
Chushang Building	Wuhan	China	475	1,558	111	2019	2022	
Fosun Bund Center T1	Wuhan	China	470	1,540	?	2022	2024	
R&F Guangdong Building	Tianjin	China	468	1,535	91	2012	2015	
Evergrande City Light	Ningbo	China	453.3	1,488	88	2021	2022	
Tianshan Gate of the World Plots 27 and 28	Shijiazhuang	China	450	1,476	106	2019	2021	
Dubai Towers Doha	Doha	Qatar	436.5	1,432	91	2007	2010	
One Bangkok O4H4	Bangkok	Thailand	436.1	1,431	92	2018	2024	
Multifunctional Highrise Complex - Akhmat Tower	Groznyi	Russia	435	1,427	102	2016	2019	
Burj Almasa	Jeddah	Saudi Arabia	432	1,417	93	2011	2024	
Chongqing Tall Tower	Chongqing	China	431	1,414	101	2017	2020	
Greenland Center Tower 1	Kunming	China	428	1,404	?	2018	2021	
Nanjing Olympic Suning Tower	Nanjing	China	419.8	1,377	99	2011	2014	
Dongfeng Plaza Tower 1	Kunming	China	407	1,335	100	2017	2020	
Haiyun Plaza Tower 1	Rizhao	China	390	1,280	86	2019	2024	
La Maison by HDS	Dubai	UAE	386.5	1,268	106	2016	2019	
Icon Tower 1	Jakarta	Indonesia	384	1,260	77	2015	2017	
Guiyang World Trade Center Landmark Tower	Guiyang	China	380	1,247	92	2017	2021	
Greenland Star City Light Tower	Changsha	China	379.9	1,225	83	2020	2023	
Square Capital Tower	Kuwait City	Kuwait	376	1,234	54	2005	2009	
Nanchang Ping An Financial Center	Nanchang	China	373	1,224	72	2021	2022	
Kweichow Moutai Tower	Guiyang	China	369	1,210	?	2021	2023	
Hengli Global Operations Headquarters Tower 1	Suzhou	China	369	1,210	?	2021	2023	
Arabtec Tower	Dubai	UAE	369	1,210	77	2014	2015	
VietinBank Business Center Office Tower	Hanoi	Vietnam	363.2	1,191	68	2011	2019	
Wanda One	Xi'an	China	360	1,181	86	2023	2025	
Sino Steel Tower	Tianjin	China	358	1,175	83	2008	2017	
Naga 3 Tower A	Phnom Penh	Cambodia	358	1,175	75	2022	2025	
Fosun Bund Center T2	Wuhan	China	356	1,168	?	2022	2024	
Baolixian Village Old Reform Project Main Building	Guangzhou	China	350	1,148	70	2022	2024	
Guowei ZY Plaza	Zhuhai	China	350	1,148	62	2021	2023	
Agricultural Development Center Tower 1	Harbin	China	350	1,148	?	2017	2021	
Global Port Tower 1	Lanzhou	China	350	1,148	?	2021	2023	
Global Port Tower 2	Lanzhou	China	350	1,148	?	2021	2023	
SUNAC A-ONE Tower 4	Chongqing	China	349	1,145	89	2020	2022	
Skyfame Center Landmark Tower	Nanning	China	346	1,135	72	2016	2022	
Wanling Global Center	Zhuhai	China	337	1,106	70	2017	2023	
Yuetai Zhuxi Financial Center	Jiangmen	China	336	1,102	71	2022	2022	
Poly 335 Financial Center Tower 1	Guangzhou	China	335.2	1,100	64	2019	2022	
Mandarin Oriental Hotel Tower A	Chengdu	China	333.1	1,093	73	2013	2016	
Jiujiang IFC	Jiujiang	China	333	1,093	66	2015	2020	
Tianjin Kerry Center	Tianjin	China	333	1,093	72	2012	2015	
IBN Bukit Bintang	Kuala Lumpur	Malaysia	330	1,083	68	2019	2023	
Huaguoyuan Zone D	Guiyang	China	330	1,080	74	2014	2020	
Huaguoyuan Zone N	Guiyang	China	330	1,080	74	2014	2020	
Jinqiao Sub-Center Block C1 Tower 1	Shanghai	China	330	1,083	?	2021	2024	
Ryugyong Hotel	Pyongyang	North Korea	330	1,080	105	1987	2012	Topped-out
The One Ritz-Carlton Tower	Colombo	Sri Lanka	326	1,070	80	2017	2021	
Dongfeng Plaza Tower 2	Kunming	China	326	1,070	72	2017	2020	
Evergrande International Center A	Nanning	China	320	1,050	68	2019	2021	
Suhewan Huaxing New City Tower 1	Shanghai	China	320	1,050	67	2022	2025	
Jiuzhou Bay Tower	Zhuhai	China	318.5	1,045	64	2019	2024	
Foshan Shuntie Holdings Tower	Foshan	China	318	1,043	60	2014	2021	
China South City Tower 1	Nanning	China	318	1,043	68	2012	2015	
Yurun International Tower	Huaiyin	China	317	1,040	75	2012	2016	
Zhongtian Future Ark City Window Office Tower	Guiyang	China	314	1,030	58	2018	2021	
Namaste Tower	Mumbai	India	310	1,070	80	2017	2021	
Chengdu Poly International Plaza	Chengdu	China	309	1,014	56	2017	2019	
Kempinski Hotel & Residences Kuala Lumpur	Kuala Lumpur	Malaysia	308.5	1,013	72	2015	2024	
Xiangmi Lake Financial Tower	Shenzhen	China	308	1,010	64	2022	2024	
Nanjing International Center 3	Nanjing	China	306	1,004	66	2020	2023	
Wuhan Yangtze River Center Tower 2	Wuhan	China	305	1,001	65	2020	2025	
Global Trade Center	Xian	China	303	994	63	2016	2021	
Global Trade Center	Xining	China	303	994	?	2020	2022	
Greenland Center North Tower	Yinchuan	China	303	994	58	2014	2021	
Greenland Center South Tower	Yinchuan	China	303	994	58	2014	2021	
Shimao Pingshan Center	Shenzhen	China	302	991	62	2019	2025	
Shimao Riverside Block D2b	Wuhan	China	300.1	985	53	2020	2025	
Brys Buzz	Noida	India	300	984	82	2014	2017	
Hangzhou West Railway Station Hub Tower 2	Hangzhou	China	300	984	68	2020	2024	
Runhua Global Center 1	Changzhou	China	300	984	60	2011	2014	
Supernova Spira	Noida	India	300	984	80	2011	2019	
Shimao SIC 1	Nanjing	China	300	984	64	2018	2022	

== Destroyed or demolished supertalls ==
Building	City	Country	Height (m)	Height (ft)	Floors	Year completed	Year destroyed
1 World Trade Center	New York City	United States	417	1,368	110	1972	2001
2 World Trade Center	New York City	United States	415.1	1,362	110	1973	2001

== List of cities with supertalls ==
This list ranks cities by number of completed supertall buildings. This list is inclusive of megatall buildings (buildings above 600 meters in height). It does not include supertall buildings that are topped out or under construction.

Rank	City	Number of supertalls
1	Dubai	34
2	Shenzhen	22
3	New York City	18
4	Guangzhou	11
5	Nanjing	8
6	Chicago	7
7	Kuala Lumpur	7
8	Wuhan	7
9	Shanghai	7
10	Changsha	6
11	Hong Kong	6
12	Moscow	6
13	Nanning	6
14	Chongqing	5
15	Jinan	5
16	Shenyang	5
17	Abu Dhabi	4
18	Busan	4
19	Kuwait City	4
20	Riyadh	4
21	Suzhou	4
22	Tianjin	4
23	Bangkok	3
24	Doha (inc. Lusail)	3
25	Guiyang	3
26	Kunming	3
27	Wuxi	3
28	Zhuhai	3
29	Beijing	2
30	Dalian	2
31	Hangzhou	2
32	Jakarta	2
33	Houston	2
34	Los Angeles	2
35	Nanchang	2
36	Qingdao	2
37	Seoul	2
38	Mumbai	2
39	Atlanta	1
40	Austin	1
41	Changzhou	1
42	Dongguan	1
43	Fuzhou	1
44	Gold Coast	1
45	Hanoi	1
46	Ho Chi Minh City	1
47	Huaxi Village	1
48	Incheon	1
49	Kaohsiung	1
50	Lanzhou	1
51	Liuzhou	1
52	London	1
53	Mecca	1
54	Melbourne	1
55	Monterrey	1
56	Astana	1
57	New Administrative Capital	1
58	Osaka	1
59	Istanbul	1
60	Philadelphia	1
61	Saint Petersburg	1
62	San Francisco	1
63	Santiago	1
64	Singapore	1
65	Taguig	1
66	Taipei	1
67	Tokyo	1
68	Warsaw	1
69	Xiamen	1
70	Xi'an	1
71	Yangzhou	1
72	Yantai	1
73	Zhenjiang	1
74	Zhongshan	1

== See also ==
- List of architects of supertall buildings
- List of megatall skyscrapers
- List of tallest buildings in the world
