= Tianjin CTF Finance Centre =

Supertall skyscraper in Tianjin, China

Coordinates: 39.0217°N 117.6981°E

- 天津周大福濱海中心
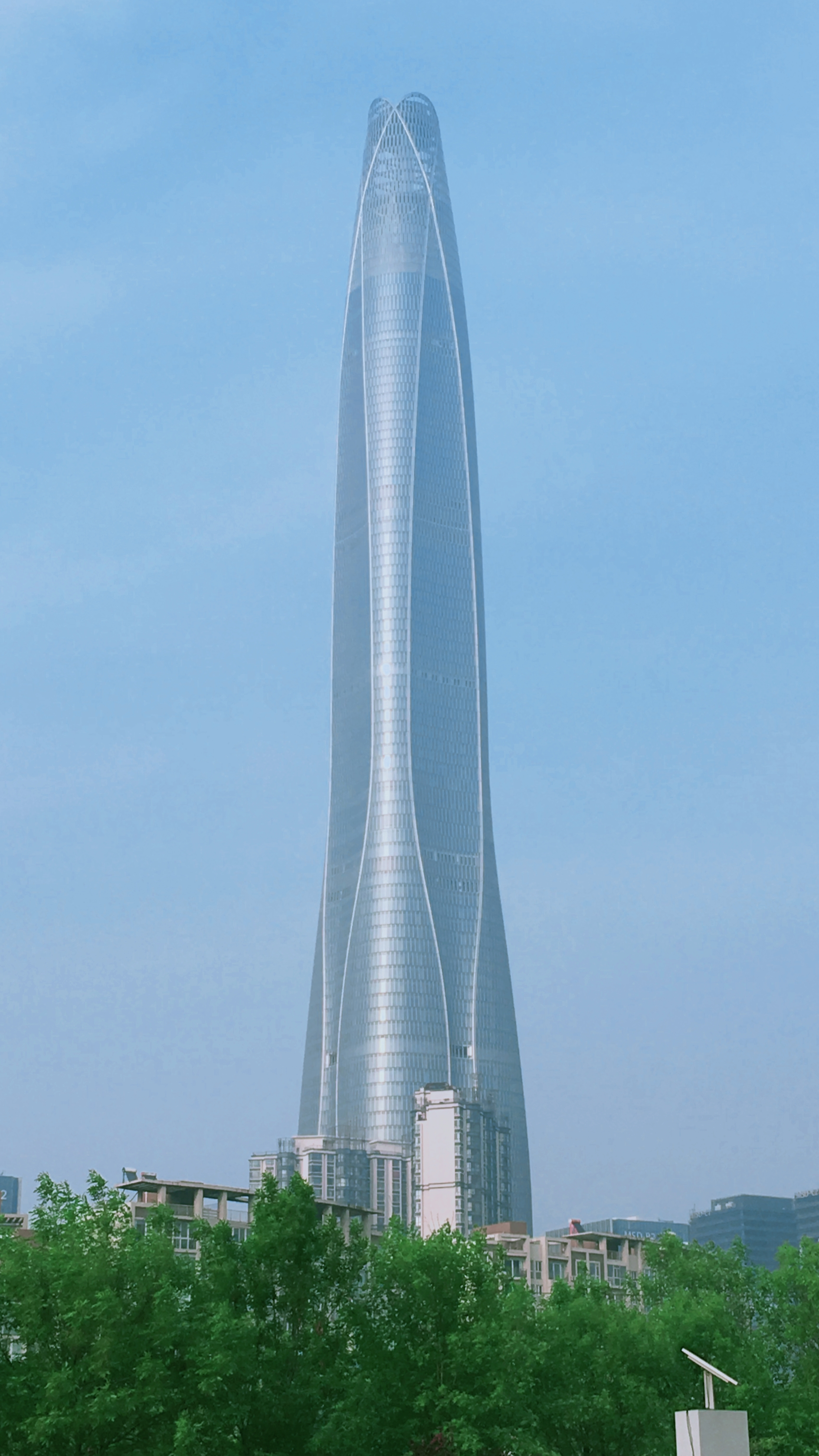
- Interactive map of the Tianjin CTF Finance Centre area
- Alternative names: Tianjin Chow Tai Fook Binhai Center
- Etymology: Chow Tai Fook, the parent company of the developer

General information
- Status: Complete
- Type: hotel / serviced apartments / office
- Location: Binhai New Area, Tianjin, China
- Groundbreaking: November 20, 2009
- Construction started: January 3, 2013
- Completed: September 22, 2019
- Owner: Tianjin New World Huan Bo Hai Real Estate Development Co. Ltd.

Height
- Architectural: 530 m (1,740 ft)
- Tip: 530.4 m (1,740 ft)
- Top floor: 439.4 m (1,442 ft)

Technical details
- Material: composite
- Floor count: 97
- Floor area: 2,714,055 ft^{2} (252,144.0 m^{2})
- Lifts/elevators: 81

Design and construction
- Architecture firm: Skidmore, Owings & Merrill LLP in collaboration with Ronald Lu & Partners
- Developer: New World Development
- Structural engineer: Skidmore, Owings & Merrill LLP
- Main contractor: China Construction 8th Engineering Division

Other information
- Number of rooms: 266 Apartments and 365 Hotel Rooms

Tianjin CTF Finance Centre
- Simplified Chinese: 天津周大福滨海中心
- Traditional Chinese: 天津周大福濱海中心
Transcriptions
Standard Mandarin
- Hanyu Pinyin: Tiānjīn Zhōu Dà Fú Bīnhǎi Zhōngxīn

Tianjin CTF Finance Centre is a supertall skyscraper located in the Tianjin Economic-Technological Development Area central business district of Binhai New Area, Tianjin, China. Construction started in 2013 and was completed in 2019. At 530 m (1,740 ft), and with 97 floors, the tower is the second-tallest building in Municipal Tianjin after the unfinished Goldin Finance 117, the eighth-tallest building in the world, and the tallest building in the world with fewer than 100 floors. It is located in the outer district of the Tianjin Economic-Technological Development Area. Tianjin CTF Finance Center is designed by Skidmore, Owings & Merrill LLP in collaboration with Ronald Lu & Partners.

The building was honored with the Tall/Slender Structure award at the 2021 Awards Ceremony by the Institution of Structural Engineers (IStructE).

== Design ==
The Tianjin CTF Finance Centre is designed with a gently curving glass facade that incorporates eight sloping mega-columns. The columns follow a line connecting the centers and corners of all four elevations. This design improves the building's seismic resilience and contributes to both its gravity and lateral systems. The columns are effective in increasing the stiffness of the building's perimeter frame, consequently attracting a larger portion of the seismic forces in compliance with the Chinese code requirements.

The façade reinforces the curvature of the tower form and creates a shimmering texture over the building's surface. The crystalline-like curtain wall stretches from the suspended glass canopies at each of the lobbies to the dematerialized, mega-column-looped crown and presents an integraded design on the Tianjin skyline.

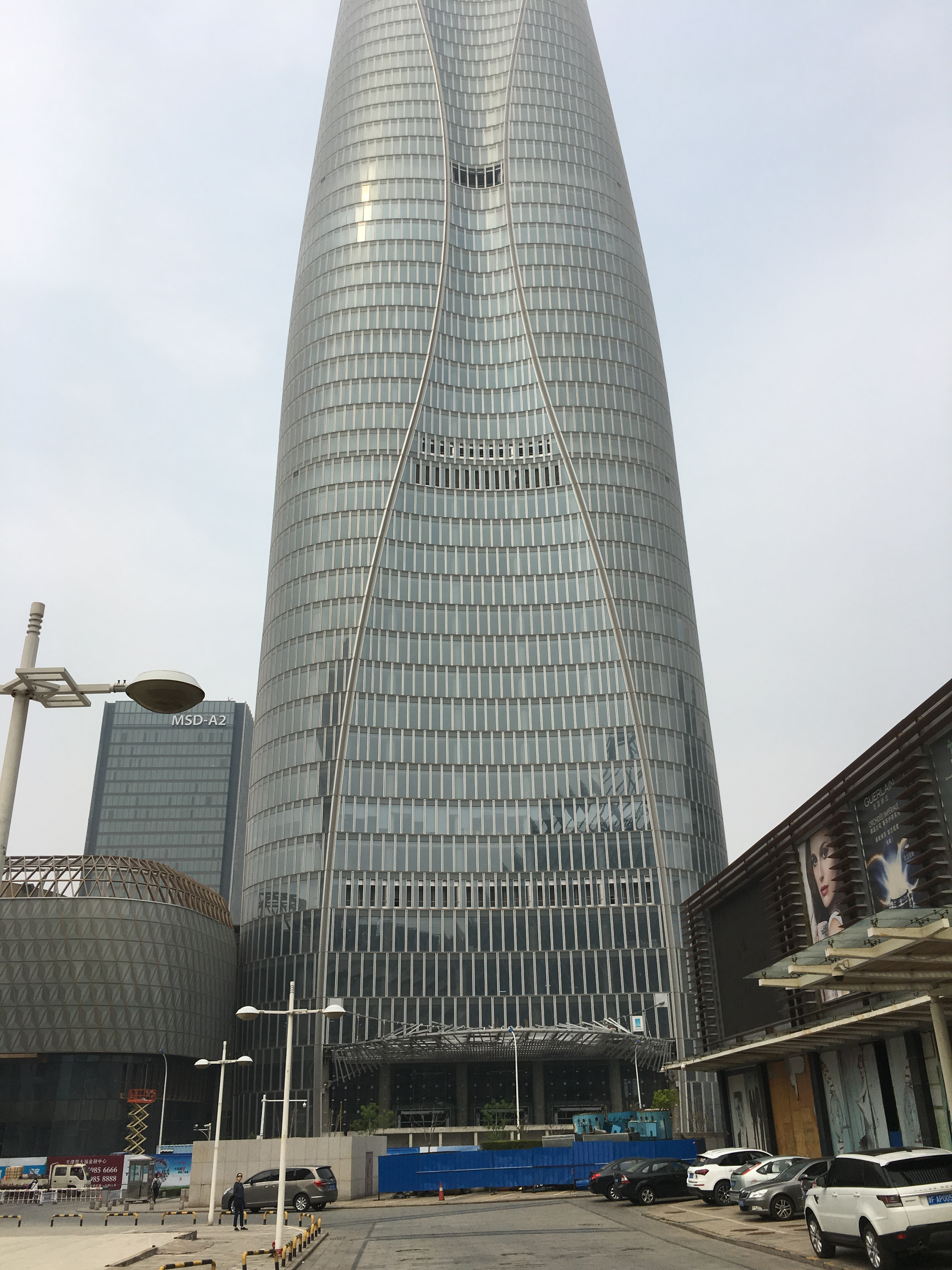
Base from street level showing concave and convex curves

== Features ==
By stacking reducing floor plates, the tower tapers dramatically to minimize the surface area exposed to wind, sun, and moisture. The gently-undulating curves of the facade subtly denote the integration of the three distinct programs within a singular smooth object. Square in plan with rounded corners, the floor plate geometry enables unique interior fit-outs and customization options for occupants. Research by the architect has shown that lateral forces due to vortex shedding can be controlled by tapering the vertical profile of the tower and softening any sharp corners in plan. The building's aerodynamic shape greatly reduces this vortex shedding by "confusing the wind" and disrupting the opportunity for any resonating wind forces and loads on the structure.

== Construction process ==
- On November 20, 2009, Tianjin Chow Tai Fook Financial Center held a groundbreaking ceremony. The then Tianjin Mayor Huang Xingguo attended the ceremony.
- The Tianjin CTF Finance Centre was proposed as an idea in 2011.
- As of April 2016, one third of the entire building had been built.
- In July 2016, the core tube of the building was poured to 260 meters.
- In September 2016, the building was built as a transition truss between the office building and the serviced residential part.
- In April 2017, CTBUH confirmed that the building had been structurally topped.
- In May 2017, the steel structure on the top of the building began to be installed.
- On October 31, 2017, the steel structure crown was sealed.
- The building was completed in September 2019.

== Building shape ==
Tianjin Chow Tai Fook Financial Center (old plan) is a polyline-shaped building with a square shape as the base, and the shape is tapered from bottom to top. In the design effect, in the daytime, the building will refract the sunlight to show various colors, and at night, the top of the inclined tower glows like a diamond. The new plan is rocket-shaped and dominated by arcs; the crown is like a cicada's wings.

== See also ==
- Goldin Finance 117
- Sino-Steel International Plaza
- Jin Wan Plaza 1
- Rose Rock International Finance Center
