= Changsha A9 Financial District =

Office building in Changsha, China

- Interactive map of the Changsha A9 Financial District area

General information
- Status: Completed
- Location: Changsha, Hunan, China
- Coordinates: 28.24513°N 112.95341°E
- Construction started: 2015
- Completed: 2022
- Opened: 2023

Height
- Architectural: 328 metres (1,076.1 ft)
- Tip: 328 metres (1,076.1 ft)

Technical details
- Floor count: 66

Changsha A9 Financial District is a supertall skyscraper under construction in Changsha, Hunan, China. It will be 328 metres (1,076.1 ft) tall. Construction of the building started in 2015 and is expected to be completed in 2021.
