= VietinBank Business Center Office Tower =

Skyscraper in Hanoi, Vietnam

Coordinates: 21°04′57″N 105°47′24″E

- Interactive map of the VietinBank Business Center Office Tower area

General information
- Status: On hold
- Location: Ciputra urban area, Tây Hồ district, Hanoi, Vietnam
- Construction started: 2011
- Cost: US$400 billion
- Owner: Foster and Partners, Halvorson and Partners

Height
- Architectural: 363.2 m (1,192 ft)
- Tip: 365 m (1,198 ft)
- Top floor: 328.4 m (1,077 ft)

Technical details
- Floor count: 68
- Lifts/elevators: 28

VietinBank Business Center Office Tower is a supertall skyscraper in the Ciputra urban area, Tây Hồ district. It was planned to be Vietinbank's headquarters in Hanoi. If built, it will be the second tallest building in Vietnam.

== History ==
In 2008, Vietinbank agreed to signed a contract with Nam Thang Long Urban Area Development Company Limited. However, because of the 2008 financial crisis, the contract was unsuccessful. So, construction did not start until 2010. The skyscraper was expected to be completed in 2014. The schedule was pushed towards 2018 because of the problems in the company's investment. In the end, the construction of the building was halted. When it was put on hold, only the basement and a few floors had been finished. After that, the future of the building is uncertain.

== See also ==
- Keangnam Hanoi Landmark Tower
- Tallest buildings in Vietnam
