= Jin Wan Plaza 9 =

Supertall skyscraper in Tianjin, China

Coordinates: 39.1293662°N 117.2035223°E

- 津湾广场9
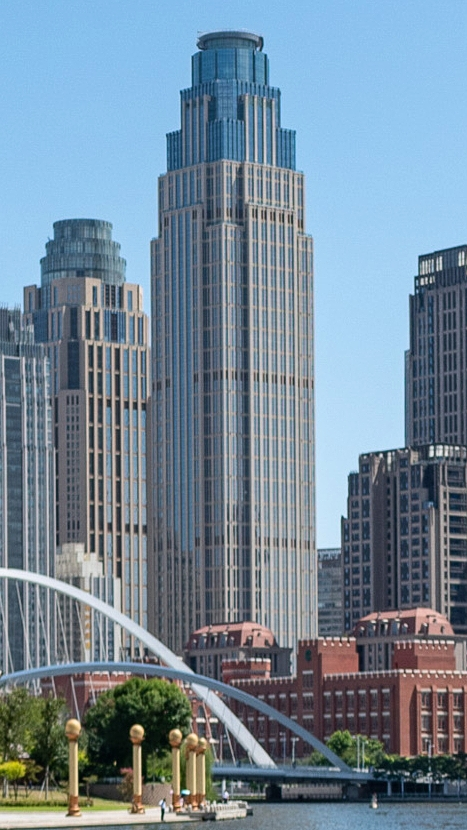
- Jin Wan Plaza 9 in 2018
- Interactive map of the Jin Wan Plaza 9 area

General information
- Status: Completed
- Location: Tianjin, China
- Construction started: 2011
- Completed: 2017

Height
- Architectural: 299.7 metres (983.3 ft)
- Tip: 299.7 metres (983.3 ft)

Technical details
- Floor count: 66

Jin Wan Plaza 9 is a supertall skyscraper in Tianjin, China. It is 300 metres (984.3 ft) tall. Construction started in 2011 and was completed in 2017. The building will consist of hotels and offices and is one of three buildings in the Jin Wan Plaza complex.
