= Huaxi Village =

Village in Jiangyin, Jiangsu, China

Huaxi 华西新市村
- Village
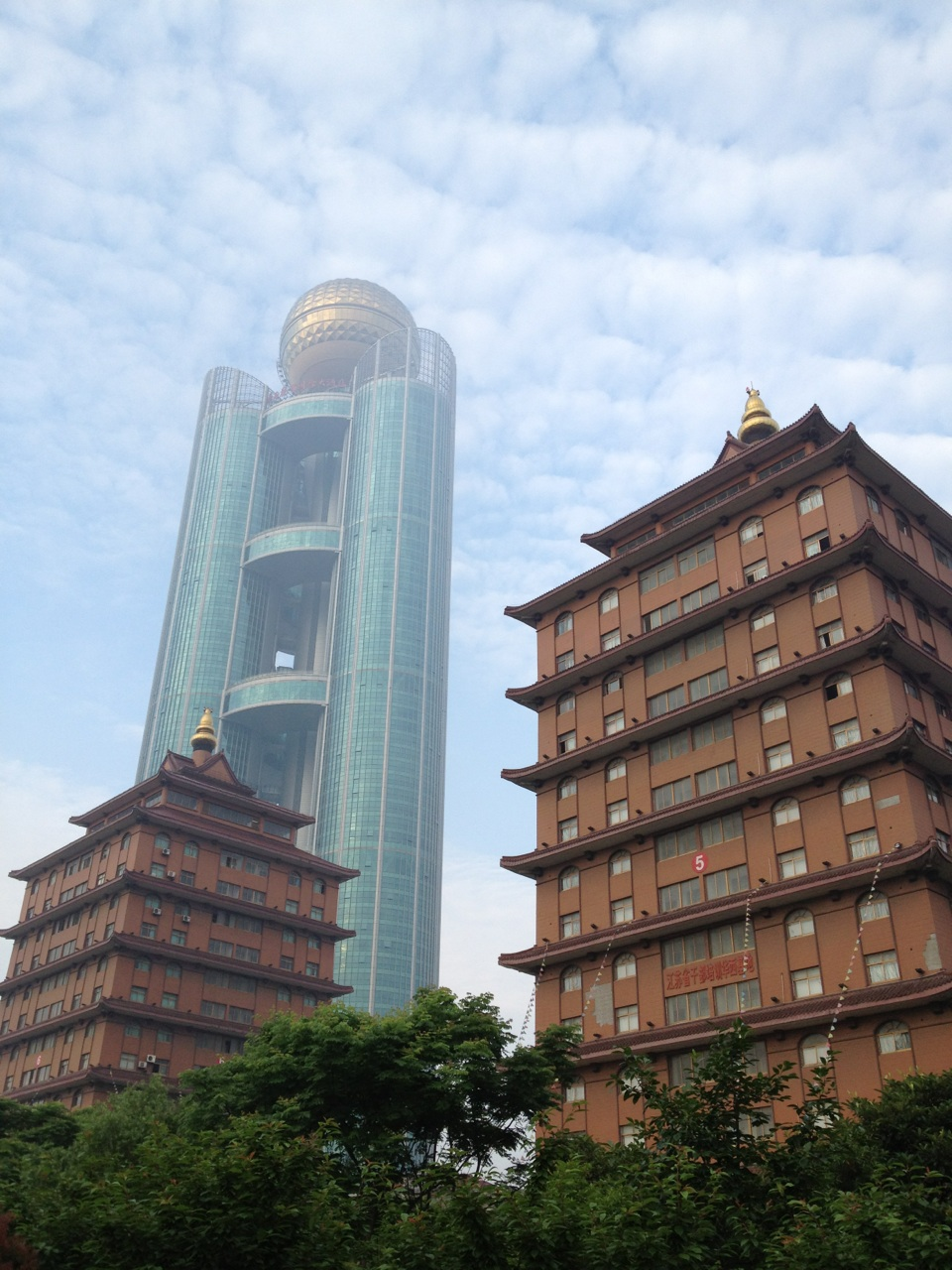

- Location in Jiangsu
- Coordinates: 31°49′37″N 120°25′52″E
- Country: People's Republic of China
- Province: Jiangsu
- Prefecture-level city: Wuxi
- County-level city: Jiangyin
- Town: Huashi
- Time zone: UTC+8 (China Standard)

Huaxi Village (simplified Chinese: 华西新市村; traditional Chinese: 華西新市村; pinyin: Huáxī xīnshì cūn), located in the east of the city centre of Jiangyin, in Jiangsu Province, claims to be the richest village in China. Huaxi calls itself a model communist village.

== About the village ==
Huaxi Village is known as the "Number One Village Under The Sky". It was founded in 1961.

According to the local authorities, all the villagers (but not the much more numerous migrant workers) have a wealth of at least €100,000. This is a substantial amount by Chinese standards. The village has a multi-sector industry company that is listed on the stock exchange, has bought airplanes and plans to buy ships. The villagers are shareholders and are paid one-fifth of the company's annual profits. In 2011 the company's turnover is expected to grow by about €6.5 billion.

In addition to 2,000 villagers, there are in the area about 20,344 migrant workers and 28,240 nearby villagers.

Wu Renbao (simplified Chinese: 吴仁宝; traditional Chinese: 吳仁寶; pinyin: wú rénbǎo), the former secretary of Huaxi Village Communist Party Committee, developed a plan to turn what used to be a poor rural locality into a modern rich community. Wu Renbao was an investor in raw materials such as aluminium. His son, Wu Xiéen, is the current village chief.

A new landmark skyscraper in Huaxi Village, the 328-meter (1,076 ft) Longxi International Hotel, was opened when the village celebrated its 50th anniversary.

== Criticism ==
Critics have accused the Wu family of a nepotistic leadership, pointing out how many important positions are filled by members of the Wu family. In a study conducted by Zhou Yi in 2004, it was found that over 90% of the village's total wealth is controlled solely by the four sons of Wu Renbao. It has also been widely reported that residents of this village cannot leave, or risk losing all of their assets. In addition, migrant workers are not considered actual residents of the village, and thus do not have access to any benefits.

In February of 2021, media outlets began reporting on the possible decline of the village, with some stating that the Huaxi Group had lost between 390 million RMB (60,441,000 USD) to 435 million RMB (67,381,500 USD) which resulted in the dividends system shrinking from 30% of company profits to just 0.5%. It was also reported that the village has gone into 6 billion USD in debt.

== See also ==
- Mondragón
