= Kunming Xishan Wanda Plaza =

Supertall skyscraper in Kunming, Yunnan, China

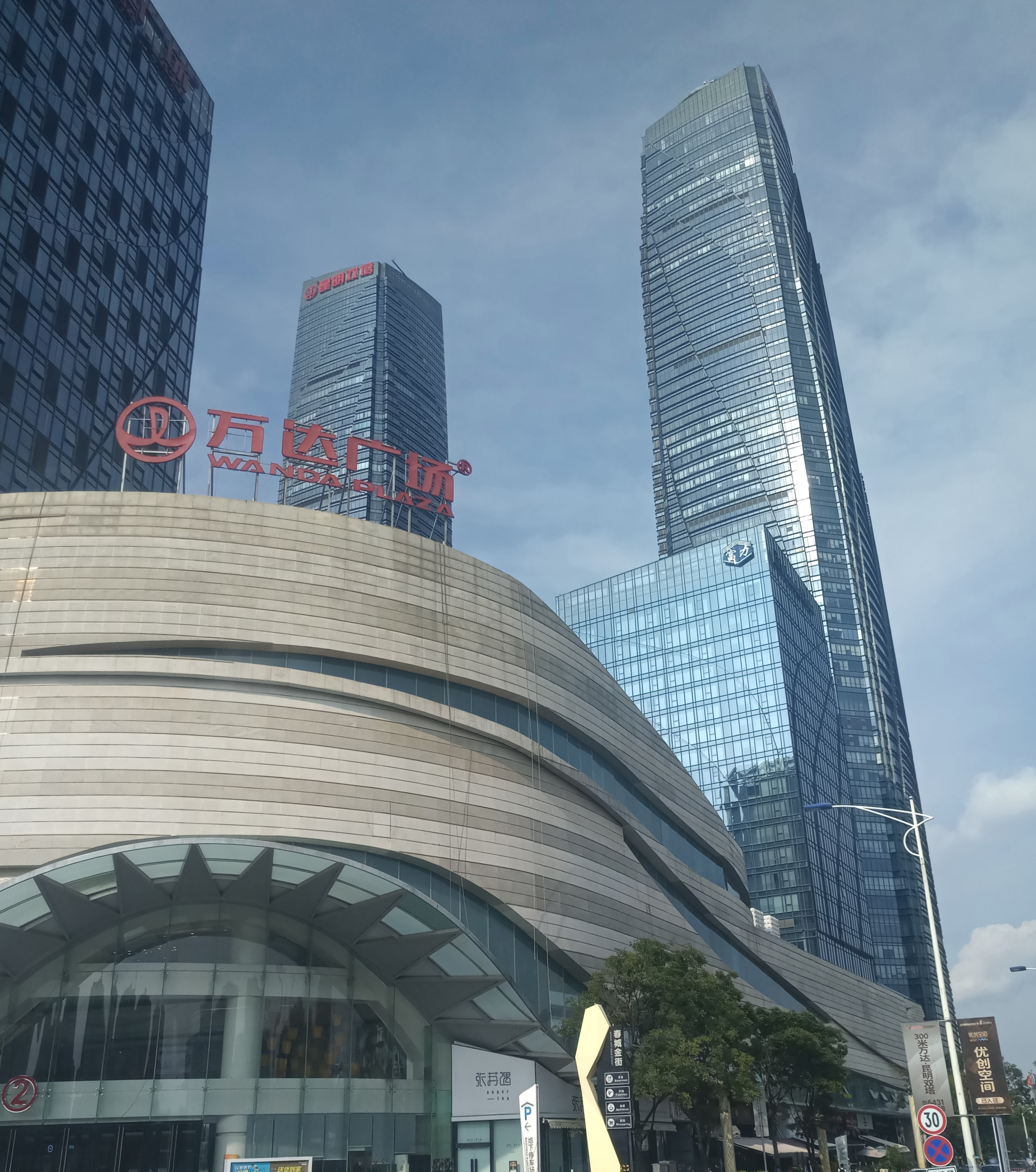
- Interactive map of the Kunming Xishan Wanda Plaza area

General information
- Status: Completed
- Location: Kunming, China
- Construction started: June 3, 2012
- Completed: December 22, 2015

Height
- Architectural: 317.67 m (1,042.2 ft)
- Tip: 317.67 m (1,042.2 ft)

Technical details
- Floor count: 70

Wanda Plaza (Chinese: 昆明西山万达广场) is a complex of two supertall skyscrapers in Kunming, Yunnan, China. The towers are called Fanya International Finance Building North and Fanya International Finance Building South. They have been topped out at a height of 317.8 meters (1,043 ft). Construction began on 3 June 2012 and ended in 2016.

== See also ==
- List of tallest buildings in China
