= Wuxi IFS =

Supertall skyscraper in Wuxi, Jiangsu, China

Coordinates: 31°33′02″N 120°18′09″E

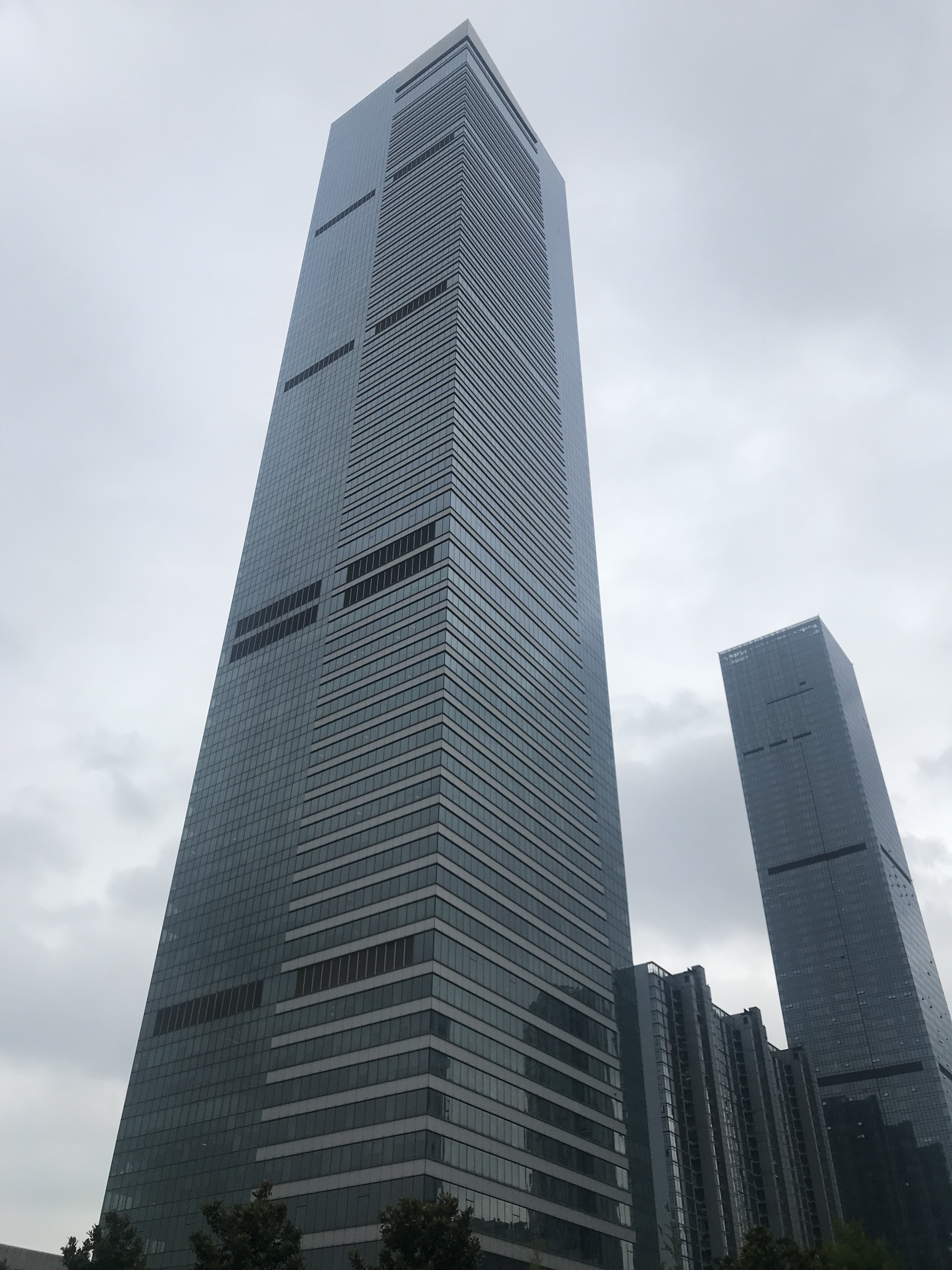
- Interactive map of the Wuxi IFS area

General information
- Type: Mixed-use
- Location: Wuxi; China
- Construction started: 2011
- Opening: 2014

Height
- Antenna spire: 339 metres (1,112 ft)

Technical details
- Floor count: 68
- Floor area: 280,000 square metres (3,014,000 sq ft)

Design and construction
- Architect: Aedas
- Developer: Hong Kong Wharf Group

Wuxi IFS (Chinese: 无锡IFS国金中心) is a late-modernist supertall skyscraper in Wuxi, China. The mixed-use tower has a height of 339 metres (1,112 ft) and contain 68 floors. Construction of the 280,000-square-metre (3,014,000 sq ft) glass and steel-building was completed in 2014.

== See also ==
- List of tallest buildings in China
