= Longxi International Hotel =

Supertall skyscraper in Jiangyin, Wuxi, Jiangsu, China

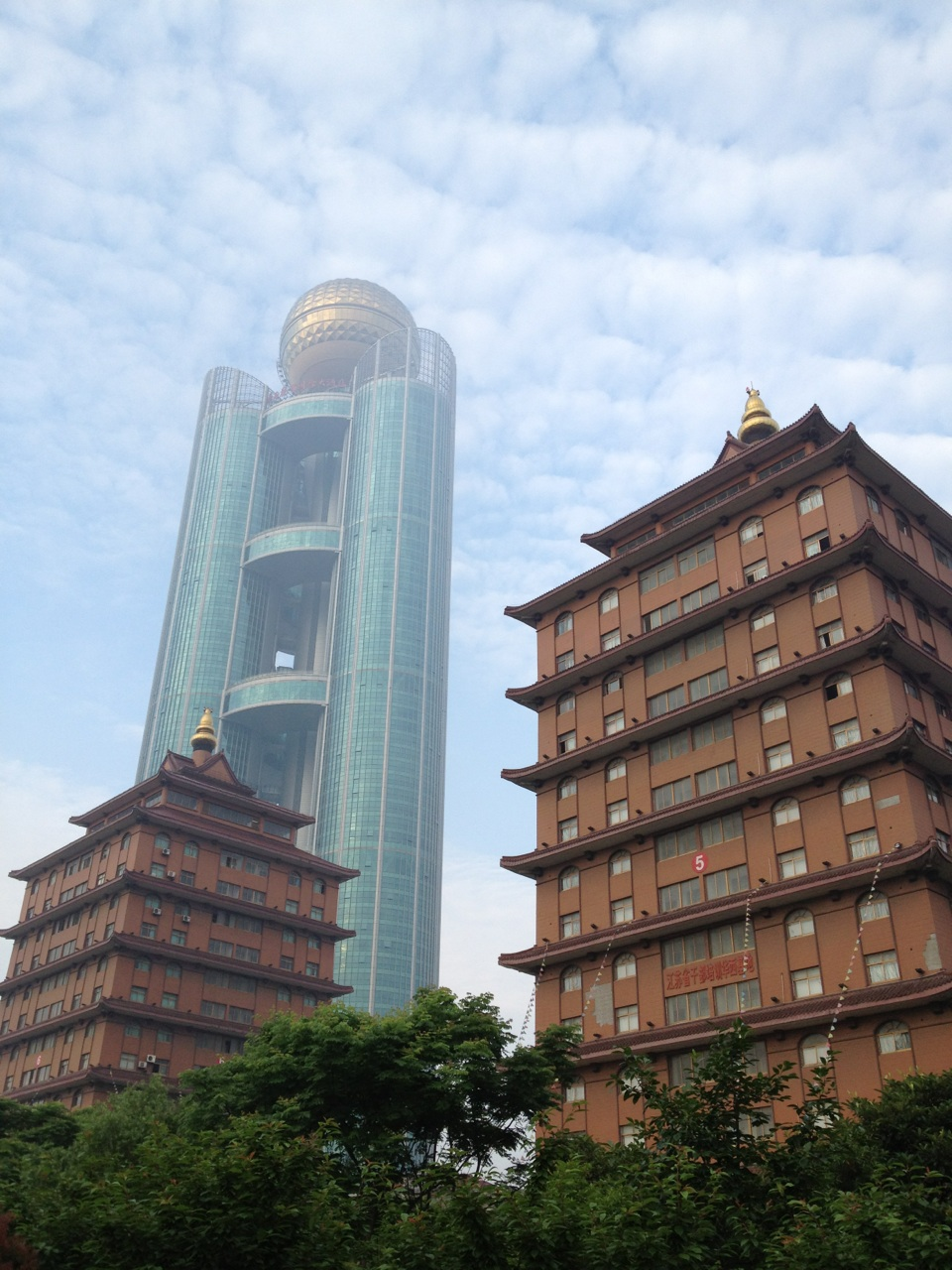
- Interactive map of the Longxi International Hotel area

General information
- Status: Completed
- Type: Mixed-use
- Location: Jiangyin, Wuxi, Jiangsu, China
- Coordinates: 31°49′49″N 120°25′19″E
- Construction started: 10 December 2007
- Opening: 12 October 2011

Height
- Architectural: 328 metres (1,076 ft)

Technical details
- Floor count: 74
- Lifts/elevators: 35

Design and construction
- Architect: A+E Design

The Longxi International Hotel or Hanging Village of Huaxi (Chinese: 空中华西村; Chinese: 空中華西村) is a late-modernist-futurism supertall skyscraper in Jiangyin, Wuxi, Jiangsu, China.

== History ==
The mixed-use tower began construction in 2008 and was completed in 2011. The building rises 328 m (1,076 ft) with 74 stories. The skyscraper includes a glass sphere at the very top. The opening of the Longxi International Hotel was on 12 October 2011.
