= Ningbo Center =

Skyscraper in Ningbo, China

Coordinates: 29.8647°N 121.6080°E

Ningbo Central Plaza Tower 1
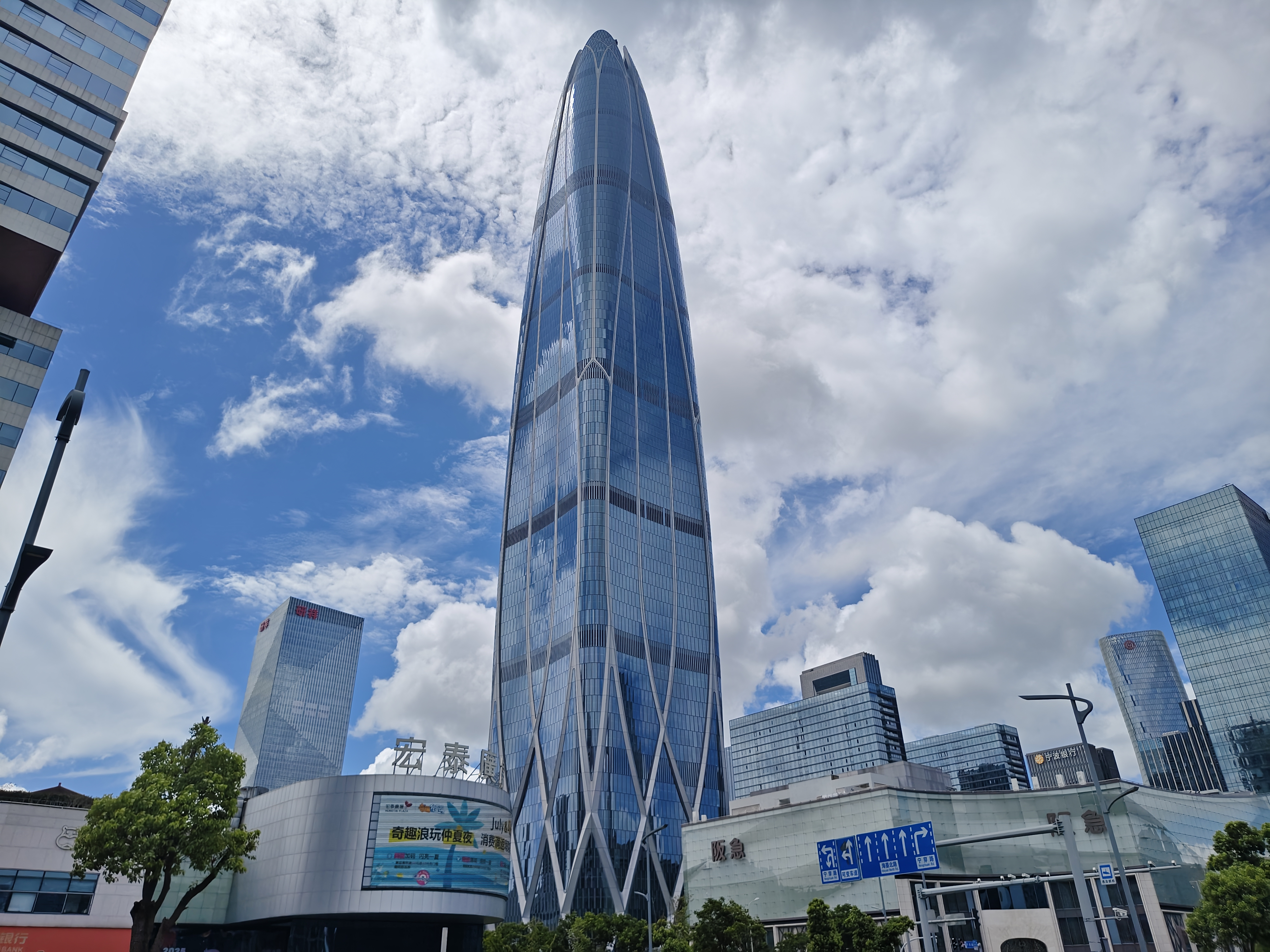
- Ningbo Center in 2025
- Interactive map of the Ningbo Central Plaza Tower 1 area

General information
- Status: Completed
- Location: Ningbo, China
- Construction started: December 31, 2018
- Completed: 2024
- Opened: April 9, 2025

Height
- Height: 409 m (1,342 ft)

Technical details
- Floor count: 80
- Floor area: 250,000 m^{2}
- Lifts/elevators: 53

Design and construction
- Architect: Skidmore, Owings & Merrill LLP
- Developer: Greentown China; Shanshan Group
- Main contractor: Shanghai Construction Group

Ningbo Center is a mixed-use supertall skyscraper in Ningbo, China. Built between 2018 and 2025, the tower stands at 409 m (1,342 ft) tall with 80 floors. It became the first supertall and the tallest building in Ningbo, surpassing the previous Ningbo Global Shipping Plaza by 146 meters. Construction started on New Year's Eve on December 31, 2018.

== History ==
Ningbo Center Building started pile foundation construction in January 2019, and the structure fully topped out in the second half of 2024. The building was opened on April 9, 2025. The top 20 floors house a Ritz-Carlton Hotel, and the bottom 60 floors contain Grade-A office space.

The building has a total construction area of about 250,000 square meters. It has 80 floors above ground and 3 floors underground. It was jointly developed by Shanghai Construction Group, Shanshan Group and Greentown China. It was designed by SOM Architects. Construction started on April 9, 2018. The bottom was completed on August 24, 2020. The upper part of the building started on November 24, 2020. On May 20, 2022, it surpassed Ningbo Global Shipping Plaza to become the tallest building in Ningbo. The top was completed on April 26, 2023. The completion acceptance and filing were completed on January 21, 2025. The building was put into use on April 9, 2025. Floors 1 to 60 of the building are Grade A office buildings, and floors 61 to 80 are the Ritz-Carlton Hotel.

== Elevator configuration ==
The fourth phase of Ningbo Center Building uses Hitachi high-speed elevators, including two HEX elevators with a running speed of up to 10 m/s, making them the fastest elevators in Zhejiang Province, and five OEX elevators, which are the first double-car elevators to appear in Ningbo.

Elevator configuration for Phase IV of Ningbo Center
| Elevator unit nr. | Nr. of units per each area | Service floor | Elevator type | Area | Notes |
|---|---|---|---|---|---|
| OP1-1 ~ OP1-6 | 6 | 1, 4-10, 12-17 | Service | Podium | |
| OP2-1 ~ OP2-6 | 6 | 1, 19-27 | Fire | Office | |
| OP3-1 ~ OP3-6 | 6 | 30, 31-37, 50-56 | Freight | Office | |
| OP4-1 ~ OP4-6 | 6 | 29, 57-58, 60-69 | Service | Office | |
| OPS-1 ~ OPS-2 | 2 | B3-B2, 1-1M | Passenger | Parking lot | |
| OEX-1 ~ OEX-5 | 5 | 1/1M, 29/30 | Shuttle | Office | |
| OEX-6 | 1 | 29-30 | Shuttle | Office | |
| OS-1 | 1 | B2, B1, 1, 3-11, 12-18, 19-28, 29-69 | Shuttle | Office | The elevator for administrative staff is decorated like a passenger elevator. |
| OS-2 | 1 | B1, 1, 3-11, 12-18, 19-28, 29-69 | Shuttle | Office | |
| OS-3 | 1 | B3-B2, B1, 1, 3-11, 12-18, 19-28, 29-69 | Passenger | Office | |
| HL-1 ~ HL-4 | 4 | 72-79, 81-87, 89 | Double-deck shuttle passenger | Office | |
| HEX-1 ~ HEX-3 | 3 | 1, 2-3, 73 | Firefighting and freight service | All | One of them cannot reach a speed of 10 m/s |
| HEX-4 | 1 | 73, 90 | Service | Hotel | |
| HPS-1 ~ HPS-2 | 2 | B3-B2, 1, 2-3 | Passenger | Parking lot | |
| HPS-3 | 1 | B3-B2, B1, 1 | Passenger | Parking lot | |
| HS-1 ~ HS-2 | 2 | 72-79, 81-89 | Shuttle | Hotel | |
| HS-FF、HS-LB | 2 | B3-B2, B1, 1, 3-11, 12-18, 19-28, 29-71, 72-90 | Passenger | Hotel | The HS-FF is a variable load elevator, which allows for operation with a maximum overload of 4000 kg. |
| PHS-1 ~ PHS-2 | 2 | B1, 2-4 | Shuttle | Hotel | |
| BB-FF | 1 | B1, 1 | Service | Parking lot | Located on the perimeter of the building and incorporated into Phase IV of Ningbo Center |

== See also ==
- List of tallest buildings in China
