= Concord Sky =

Under-construction mixed-use skyscraper in Toronto

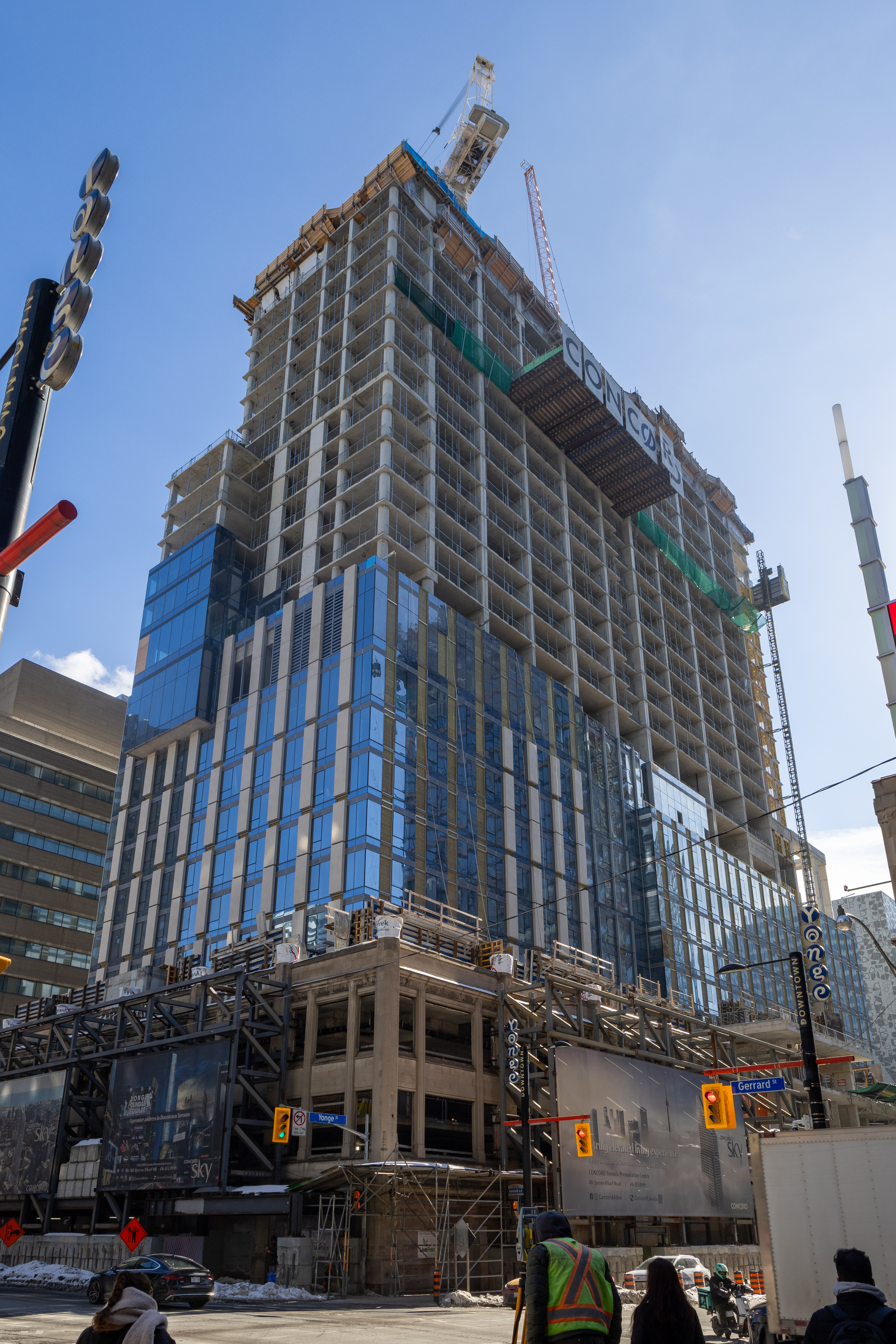
- Under construction in February 2026
- Interactive map of the Concord Sky area

General information
- Status: Under construction
- Type: Residential and retail
- Architectural style: Neomodern
- Location: 385 Yonge Street; Toronto, Ontario, Canada
- Coordinates: 43°39′31″N 79°22′53″W
- Construction started: 2021
- Estimated completion: 2027

Height
- Architectural: 300 m (984 ft)

Technical details
- Floor count: 85
- Floor area: 94,000 square metres (1,011,808 sq ft)

Design and construction
- Architecture firm: Kohn Pedersen Fox architectsAlliance
- Developer: Concord Adex
- Structural engineer: Jablonsky, Ast and Partners

Website
- concordsky.ca

Concord Sky (formerly YSL Residences) is a mixed-use skyscraper under construction in Toronto, Ontario, Canada. Upon completion, the building will surpass First Canadian Place in height to become Canada's third-tallest skyscraper.

== History ==
When YSL Residences was first proposed in 2017, the plan called for the construction of a 98-story, 343.9 m (1128 ft) tall building with a sloping south face that was pinched-in partway up. However, following a hearing with the LPAT in 2018, the building's height was scaled back considerably to 300 m (984 ft), but had various community amenities not present in the original proposal added. The building now features a sloping north face with inset balconies.

In 2020, the project was put on pause due to the COVID-19 pandemic. Developer Cresford Development went into receivership and construction has not resumed. The existing building on site was removed except for its facade, which is to be preserved, leaving a pit and construction office on site.

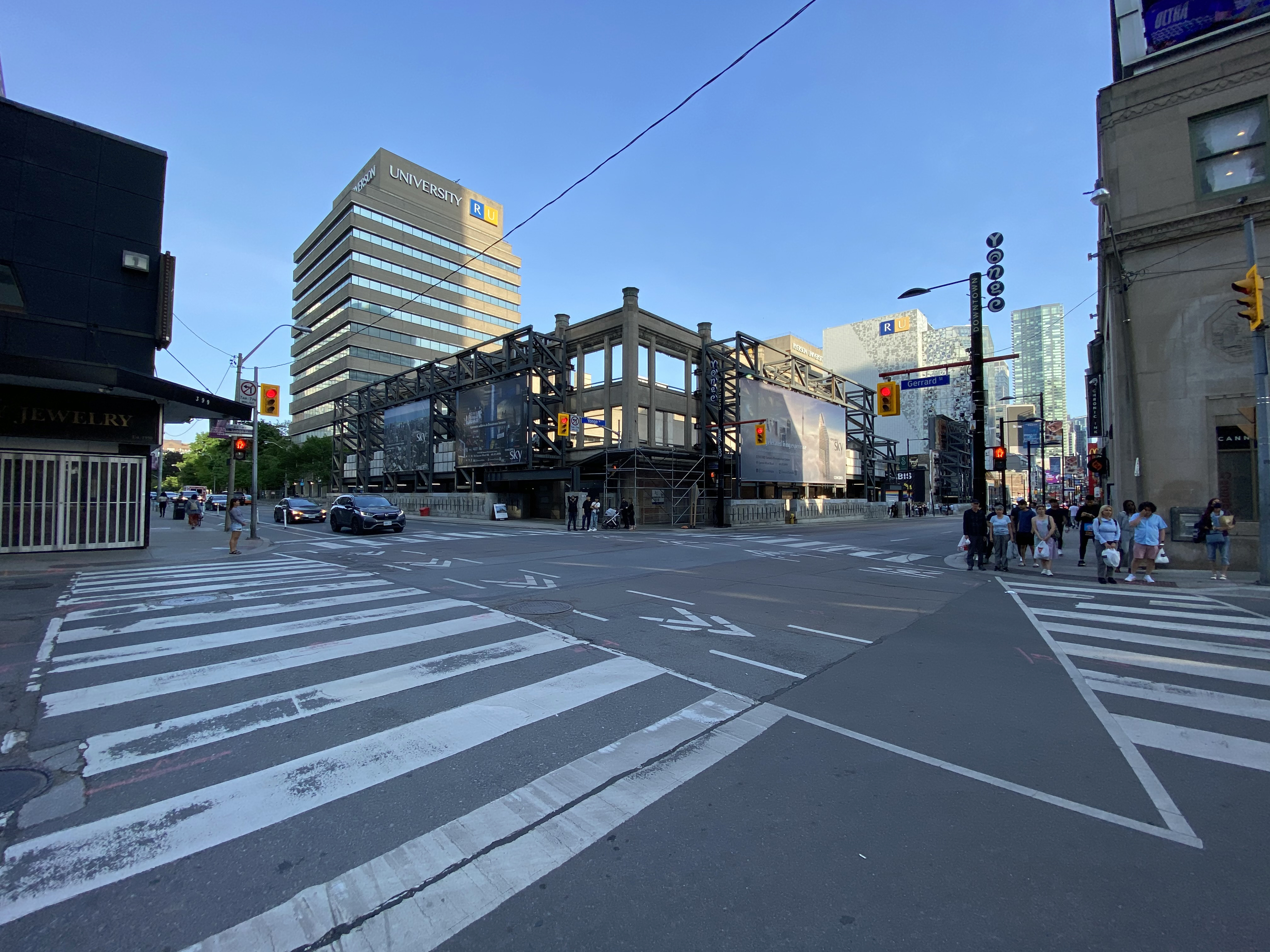
Concord Sky construction site in 2022

In 2021, the project was sold to Canadian developer Concord Adex and rebranded as Concord Sky. Units began presale the same year, with construction to resume in the near future.

In May 2023, the City of Toronto issued a Stop Work Order because "construction of the elevator core, interior load-bearing walls, and column footings for the building's P5 level have proceeded without a building permit, and exceeded the scope of approved building permits for the site's shoring and foundation construction".

By 2024, vertical construction on the skyscraper was underway and 9 floors had been poured by early January 2025.

== See also ==
- List of tallest buildings in Canada
- List of tallest buildings in Ontario
- List of tallest buildings in Toronto
