= Torre Rise =

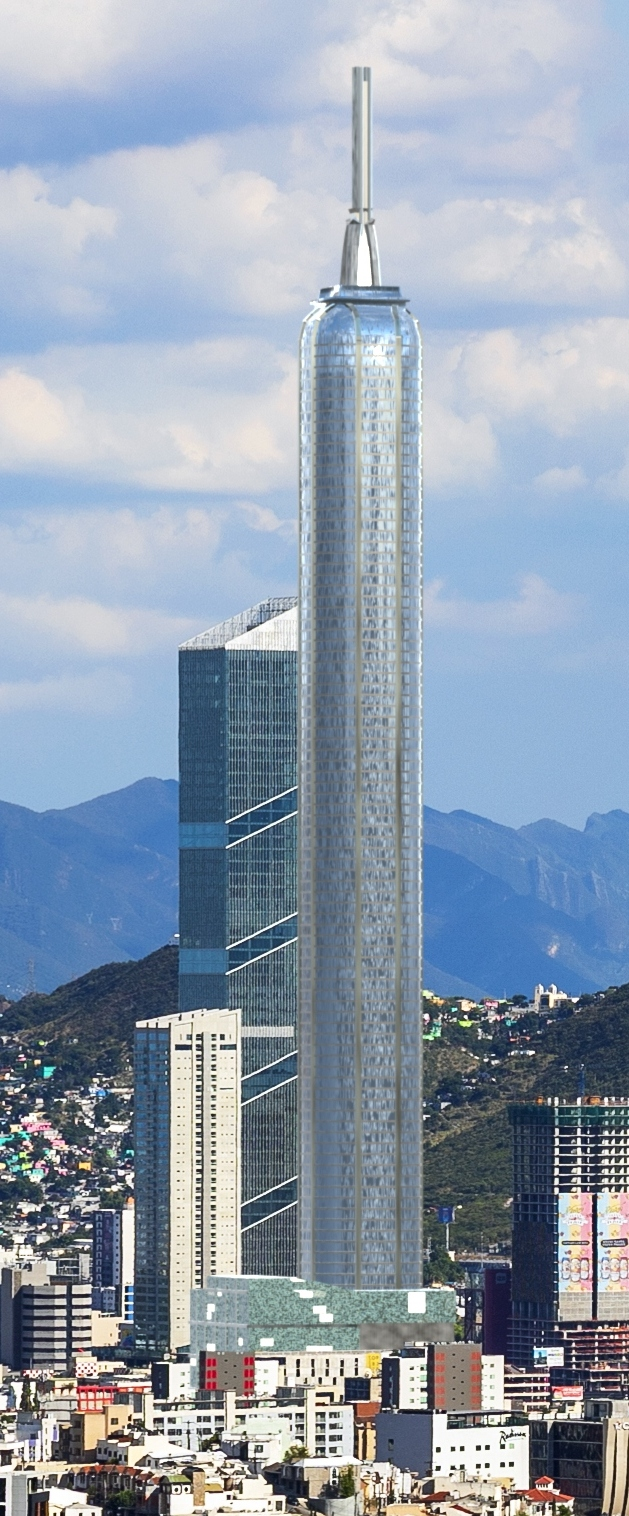

General information
- Status: Under construction
- Type: Skyscraper
- Location: Monterrey, Nuevo Leon, Mexico
- Construction started: 2022
- Completed: December 2026

Height
- Architectural: 484 metres (1,588 ft)
- Top floor: 403.2 metres (1,323 ft)
- Observatory: 403.2 metres (1,323 ft)

Technical details
- Floor count: 96 (+ 5 below ground)

Design and construction
- Architect: Esteban Ramos (Ancore Development Group)
- Main contractor: Ancore group

Website
- Official website

Torre Rise (Spanish for Rise Tower) is a skyscraper under construction that is located in the Mexican city of Monterrey (Nuevo León), between Constitución and Hidalgo avenues, on one side of the Santa Catarina River, in the Obispado area. It is planned to be 484 metres high with 96 floors plus 5 floors underground, and its construction will extend through 2026.

When its construction is completed, it is expected to become the tallest skyscraper in Mexico and Latin America, the second tallest in the Americas after One World Trade Center in New York, and the 13th in the world, surpassing the nearby 305-meter Torres Obispado, which since 2020 is the tallest building in Latin America.

The project foresees that the tower will house a hotel with ten floors, forty floors of offices and twenty floors of apartments, as well as an observation deck, a restaurant, an area of cultural exhibitions, two floors of shops and fourteen floors of parking. The publicly accessible observation deck will offer 360-degree views and will occupy three of its highest floors. There are also plans for a station on Metrorrey line 4, also under construction, to reach this site.

== Timeline ==
In May 2022, work began on the site with the demolition of some buildings that were on it. In December 2022, excavation of the tower's foundations began.

In March 2023, there was a water leak in the ground due to the proximity of the Santa Catarina River and the depth of the excavations, which forced the work to be temporarily suspended.

In October 2025, it was announced that the height of the skyscraper would be increased to 484 meters.

End of February 2026, the construction reached 74th floor and topped T.OP 1 of nearby Torres Obispado as tallest building in Mexico and Latin America.

== See also ==
- List of tallest buildings in Monterrey
- List of tallest buildings in Mexico
- List of tallest buildings in Latin America
- List of supertall skyscrapers
