= Burj Binghatti Jacob & Co Residences =

Supertall skyscraper under construction in Dubai, UAE

- Interactive map of the Burj Binghatti Jacob & Co Residences area

General information
- Status: Under construction
- Type: Residential
- Location: Business Bay, Dubai, United Arab Emirates
- Coordinates: 25.186675°N 55.292944°E
- Construction started: October 2022
- Estimated completion: 2027

Height
- Architectural: 557 m (1,827 ft)

Technical details
- Floor count: 105

Design and construction
- Architect: Silver Stone Engineering Consultants
- Developer: Binghatti Properties
- Main contractor: Granada Europe Construction

Website
- Official website

Burj Binghatti Jacob & Co Residences is a supertall skyscraper under construction in Business Bay, Dubai, United Arab Emirates. The planned height is a total of 557 metres (1,827 ft) with 104 floors and 7 basement levels.

== History ==
In November 2022, Binghatti Properties announced a collaboration with Jacob & Co to construct the tallest residential building in the world in Dubai's Business Bay, surpassing the Central Park Tower in New York City. The skyscraper will be built on a plot of land that was previously intended for a mixed-use building with 44 floors under the name Renaissance Tower.

A crown with diamond-shaped spires is planned for the new skyscraper. Official sales for residences started in June 2023. The building will include residential units and five penthouses on the upper floors.

Above-ground construction commenced in February 2025.

== See also ==
- List of tallest buildings in Dubai
- List of tallest buildings in the United Arab Emirates
- List of tallest residential buildings
