= Hengqin International Finance Center =

Skyscraper in Zhuhai, Guangdong, China

- 横琴国际金融中心
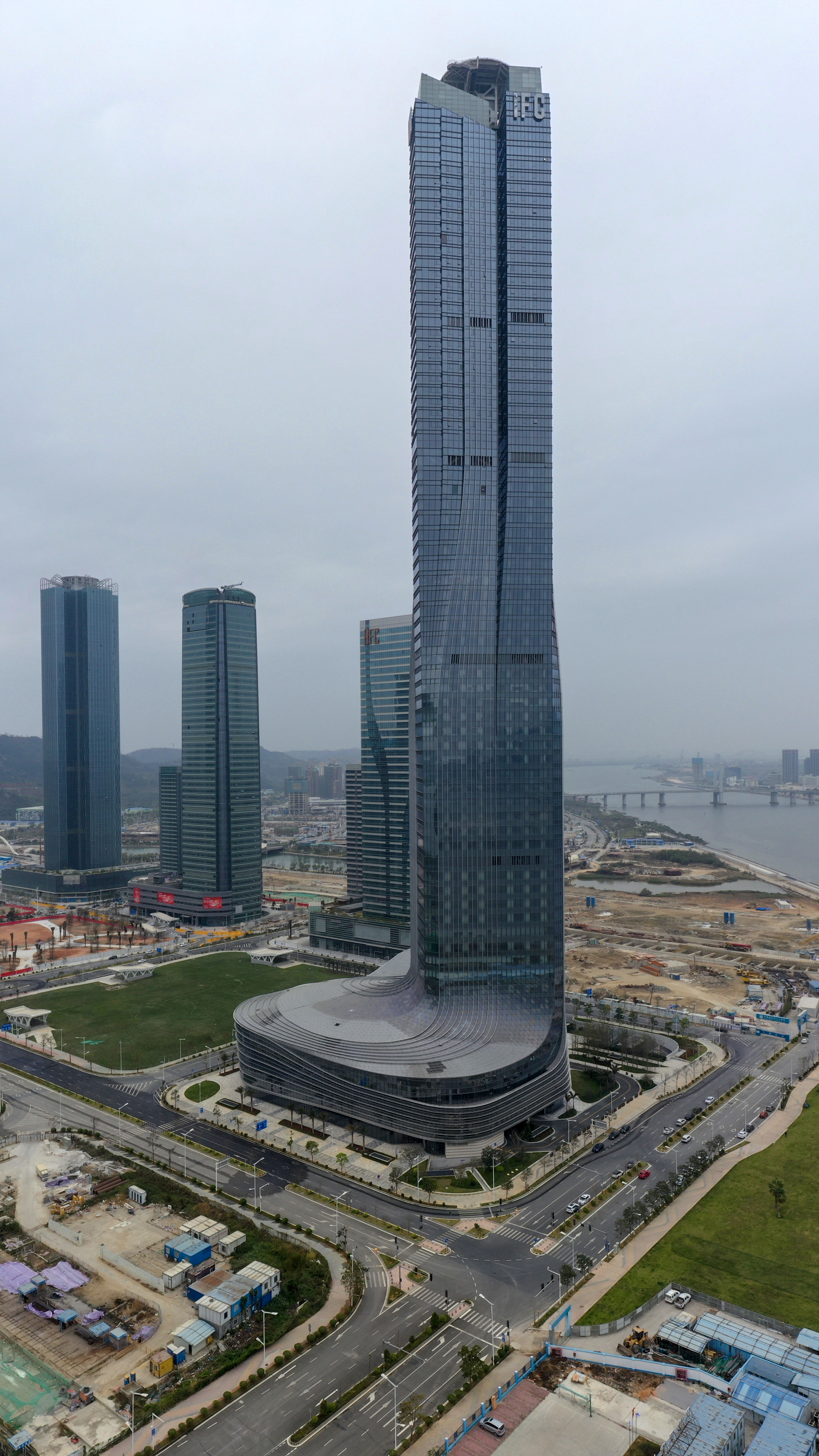
- Interactive map of the Hengqin International Finance Center area

General information
- Status: Completed
- Type: Mixed-use, Residential, Office, Retail
- Location: Zhuhai, China, 158 Huitong 6th Road, Hengqin, Xiangzhou 5G7M+2CM
- Coordinates: 22.16271°N 113.53355°E
- Construction started: 2015
- Completed: 2020

Height
- Roof: 337.7 m (1,108 ft)

Technical details
- Structural system: Reinforced concrete
- Floor count: 69 (+4 underground)
- Floor area: 218,955 m^{2} (2,360,000 sq ft)

Design and construction
- Architect: Aedas
- Structural engineer: Buro Happold (façades); CoxGomyl (façade maintenance equipment); Motioneering (damping)

The Hengqin International Finance Center (Chinese: 横琴国际金融中心) is a mixed-use skyscraper in the Xiangzhou District of Zhuhai, China. Built between 2015 and 2020, the tower stands at 337.7 m (1,108 ft) tall with a total of 69 floors.

== History ==
=== Architecture ===
The tower is situated at the mouth of the Pearl River and offers a view of Macau province from the opposite bed of the river. The swirling increase in volume represents the concept which symbolizes the Chinese legend of flood dragons coming from the sea, representing the region's strength and power. The glass and metal panels cover the elevations. The tower's four components rise from the podium's side, representing the coming together of skills from Zhuhai, Macau, Hong Kong, and Shenzhen.

The development includes a variety of mixed programs, such as class A office building space, conference and exhibition facilities, commercial apartments, and retail spaces. Traditional and commercial areas are situated in the lower level to facilitate convenient entry. The offices are located halfway up the tower, with the apartments situated at the top.

The tower is the recipient of 18 prizes accomplished since its project status in 2014, such as the "Asia Pacific Property Awards 2014", the "AAP Architecture Prize 2017" and the "MUSE Design Awards 2022".

== See also ==
- List of tallest buildings in Shenzhen
- List of tallest buildings in China
