= Nanjing Olympic Suning Tower =

Building in Nanjing, China

- Interactive map of the Nanjing Olympic Suning Tower area
- Alternative names: Nanjing Tower

General information
- Status: On-hold
- Type: Residential / hotel / office
- Location: Nanjing, China
- Coordinates: 31.9969°N 118.7142°E
- Construction started: October 30, 2011
- Completed: TBA
- Owner: Suning Real Estate Group

Height
- Architectural: 419.8 m (1,377 ft)
- Tip: 419.8 m (1,377 ft)

Technical details
- Floor count: 99
- Floor area: 226,000 m^{2} (2,430,000 sq ft)
- Lifts/elevators: 46

Design and construction
- Architects: JAHN; Shanghai Institute of Architectural Design & Research
- Structural engineer: Werner Sobek Group GmbH

The Nanjing Olympic Suning Tower (Chinese: 南京奥体CBD苏宁广场) is a skyscraper that was previously under construction in Nanjing, Jiangsu, China. It was expected to be completed in 2017 but was put on hold. The building site is near to the Nanjing Olympic Sports Centre. Construction of the tower restarted in 2020 and its new planned completion date is 2025.
