= Sino-Steel Tower =

Under-construction Skyscraper in Tianjin, China

Coordinates: 39°00′17″N 117°39′49″E

Sino-Steel International Plaza
- 中钢国际广场
- Artist's render of the Plaza and the tower.
- Interactive map of the Sino-Steel International Plaza area

General information
- Status: On hold
- Type: Mixed-use
- Location: Tianjin, China
- Construction started: 2008
- Estimated completion: TBA

Height
- Antenna spire: 358 m (1,175 ft)

Technical details
- Floor count: 83
- Floor area: 200,000 m^{2} (2,200,000 sq ft)

Design and construction
- Architect: MAD Studio Beijing

The Sino-Steel Tower (Chinese: 中钢大厦) is a 333 m (1,093 ft) tall skyscraper on hold in Tianjin, China. Construction started in 2008 and was originally expected to be complete in 2014. In March 2012, the plaza construction went on hold after the construction commenced, construction was then resumed in 2017.

The building, when completed, will contain offices and a hotel on 80 floors. The design by MAD Studio, Beijing, is for the building to be clad in white and pierced by recessed hexagonal windows. Some of the window surrounds will be crimson in colour, causing the building's appearance to alter with the changing light.
