= Shandong IFC =

Under-construction skyscraper in Jinan, Shandong, China

Coordinates: 36°40′11″N 117°05′52″E

Shandong International Financial Center
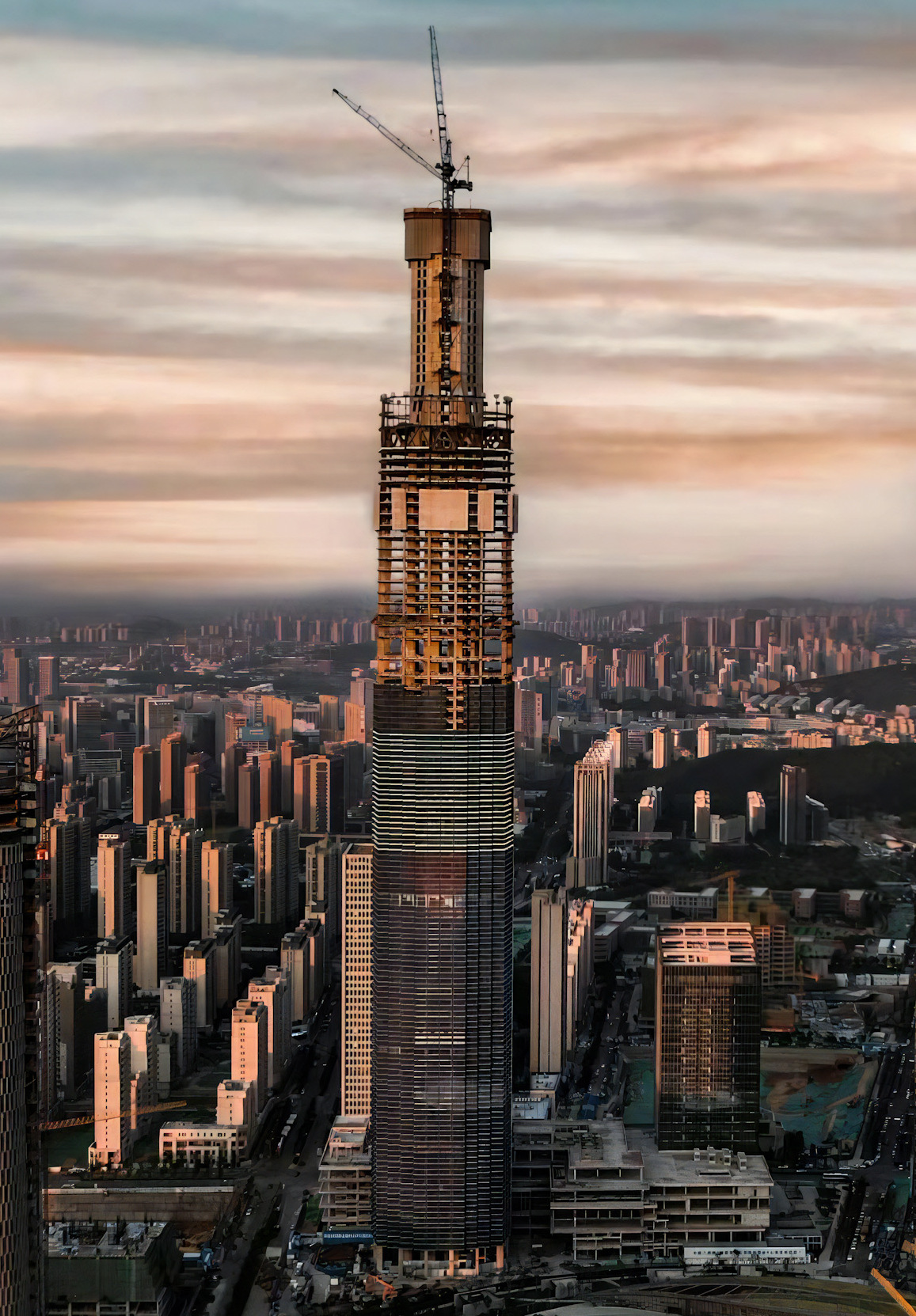
- The tower under construction in July 2022
- Interactive map of the Shandong International Financial Center area

General information
- Status: Completed
- Type: Mixed use: Hotel; Office; Residential
- Location: Jinan, Shandong, China
- Construction started: April 14, 2018
- Estimated completion: 1 November 2025
- Opened: 20 December 2025

Height
- Height: 428 metres (1,404 ft)

Technical details
- Floor count: 88

Design and construction
- Architect: Skidmore, Owings & Merrill LLP

Shandong International Financial Center (Chinese: 山东国际金融中心) is a 428-metre (1,404.2 ft) super tall skyscraper in the Jinan Central Business District, Jinan, Shandong, China. The tower is built by the developer Greenland and IFC stands for "International Finance Center". In March 2021, the tower became the tallest building in Jinan by surpassing the 333-metre (1,093 ft) tall Jinan Center Financial City A5-3. Since January 2025, the building reached its final height of 428m and is the tallest building in the Shandong Province. The tower is the 15th tallest building in China and 30th in the world. It was completed on December 20, 2025.

== See also ==
- List of tallest buildings in China
- List of tallest buildings in the world
