= Xi'an Glory International Financial Center =

Supertall skyscraper in Xi'an, Shaanxi, China

- 西安国瑞国际金融中心
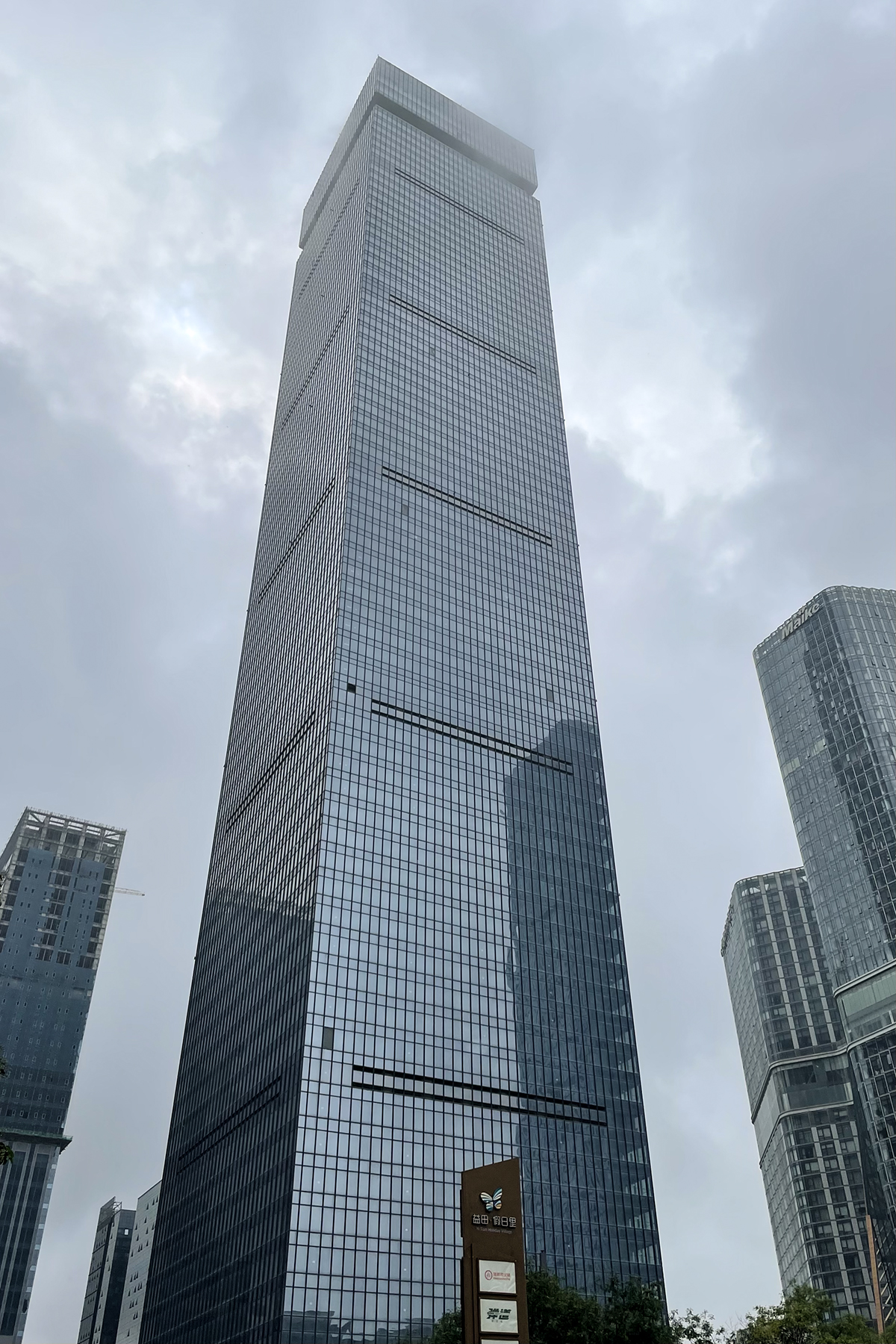
- Xi'an Financial Center in 2023
- Interactive map of the Xi'an Glory International Financial Center area

General information
- Status: Completed
- Type: office
- Location: Jinye Road, Xi'an, China
- Construction started: October 16, 2015
- Completed: August 23, 2022

Height
- Architectural: 350 m

Technical details
- Material: Steel, concrete encased steel, reinforced concrete
- Floor count: 75
- Floor area: 289,978 m^{2} (3,121,300 sq ft)

Design and construction
- Developer: Guorui Properties

The Xi'an Glory International Financial Center (Chinese: 西安国瑞国际金融中心) is a 75-story building located on Jinye Road in Xi'an, Shaanxi, China. With a height of 350 meters (1,148 feet), it is the tallest building in Northwest China.

== History ==
The building was proposed in 2014. Construction started in 2015, and was finished in 2022. As of 2021, it is architecturally topped-out and expected to be fully complete in 2021.

== See also ==
- List of tallest buildings
