= Greenland Group Suzhou Center =

Supertall skyscraper in Suzhou, Jiangsu, China

- 绿地集团苏州中心
- Interactive map of the Greenland Group Suzhou Center area

General information
- Status: Completed
- Location: Chunjiang Road, Wujiang, Suzhou, China
- Coordinates: 31°8′8.7″N 120°35′2.9″E
- Groundbreaking: 2013
- Construction started: July 17, 2014
- Completed: 2025
- Opened: 30 March 2026
- Inaugurated: 1 April 2026

Height
- Height: 1,175 feet (358 m)

Technical details
- Floor count: 77 above ground 3 below ground
- Floor area: 310,000 m^{2} (3,300,000 sq ft)

Design and construction
- Architecture firm: Skidmore, Owings and Merrill
- Structural engineer: Skidmore, Owings and Merrill

Greenland Group Suzhou Center is a supertall skyscraper in Suzhou, China by the Greenland Group. It is 358 metres (1,174.5 ft) tall. Construction started in 2014 and was completed in 2025.

== Design ==
The building was designed by Skidmore, Owings, and Merrill. It has a 30-floor operable windows and a center atrium that divided the building's interior into the east and the west rooms, which was designed to improve the tower's ventilation.

== See also ==
- List of tallest buildings in China
