= List of tallest buildings in Nanning =

Tall buildings in Nanning
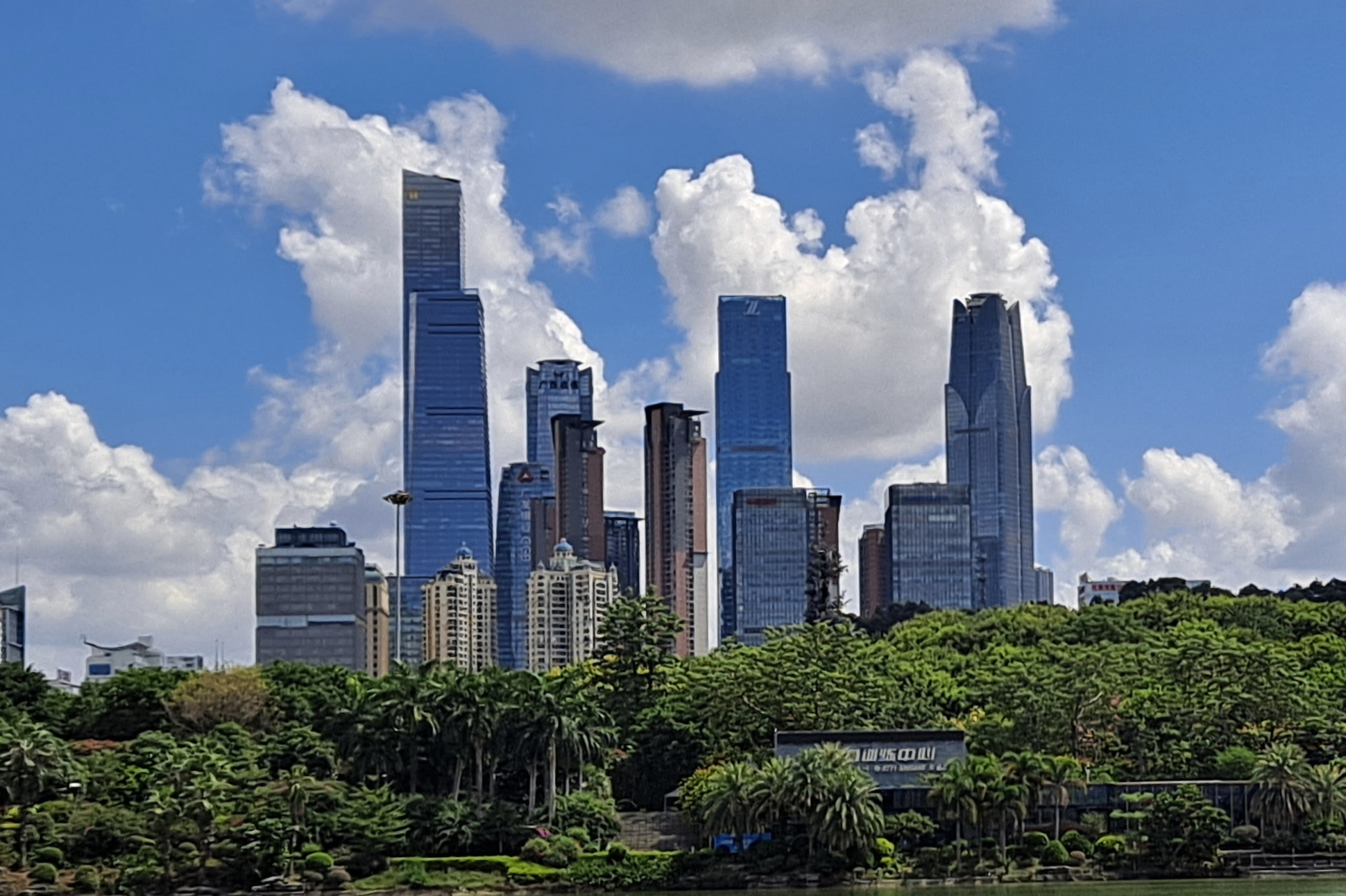
- Skyline of Qingxiu District
- Tallest building: Guangxi China Resources Tower
- Tallest building height: 402.7 m (1,321 ft)
- First 150 m+ building: Nanning No. 2 Telecom Hinge Building (1999)

Number of tall buildings
- Taller than 150 m (492 ft): 93 (2025)
- Taller than 200 m (656 ft): 36 (2025)
- Taller than 300 m (984 ft): 6 (2025) (9th)
- Taller than 400 m (1,312 ft): 1

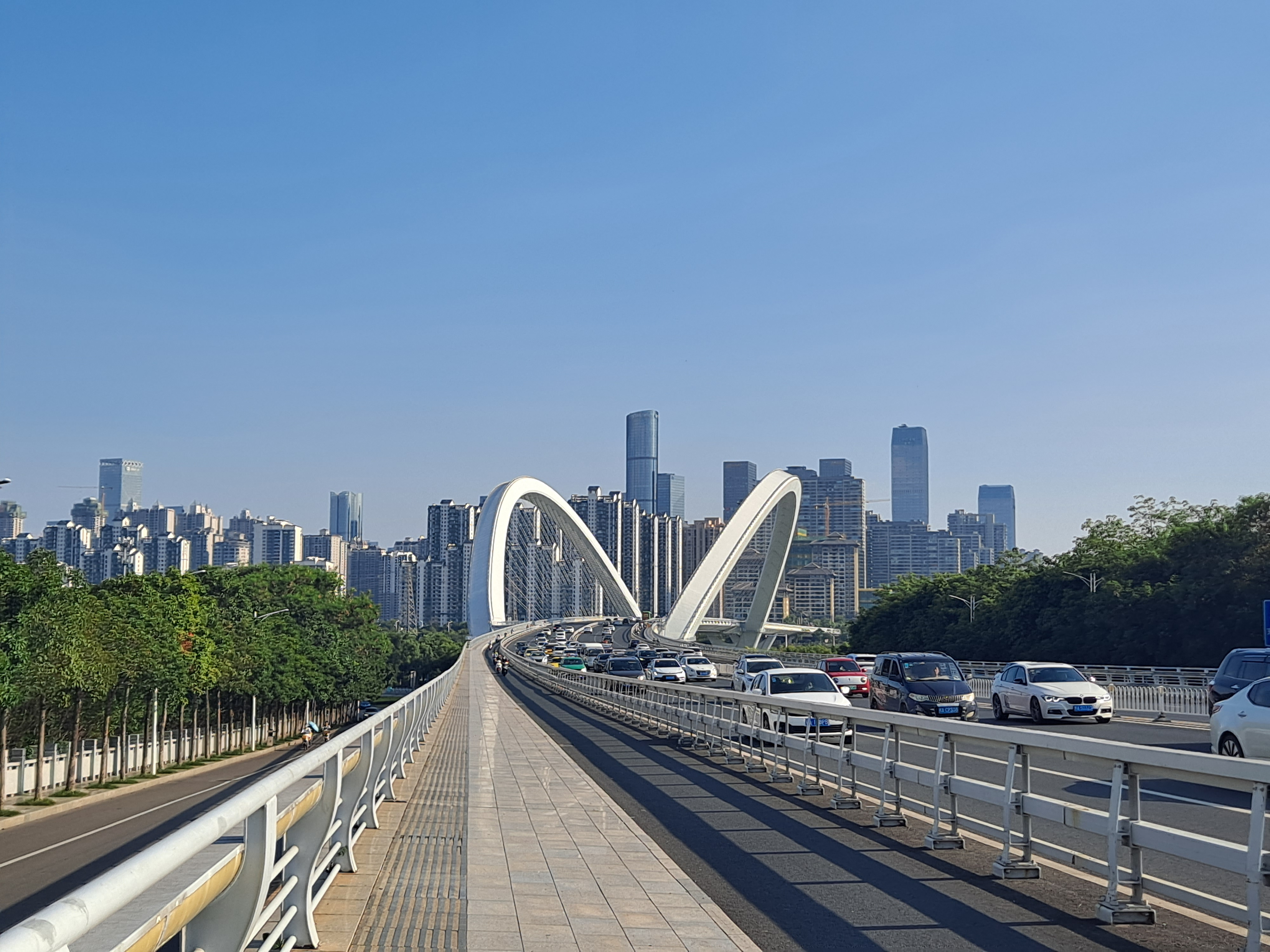
View of Wuxiang New Area over Nanning Bridge

This list of tallest buildings in Nanning ranks buildings in the Chinese city of Nanning by height. Nanning is the capital and largest city of Guangxi, an autonomous region in South China, with a population of 8.7 million and an urban area population of over 5.9 million as of the 2020 census. It is considered the economic, financial and cultural center of Guangxi.

The history of skyscrapers in Nanning began with the completion of the Nanning No. 2 Telecom Hinge Building in 1999, the first in the city to be taller than 150 meters (492 feet). It was surpassed seven years later with the construction of Diwang International Commerce Center in 2006, which rose to a height of 276 m (906 ft). Starting the mid-2010s, Nanning underwent a large construction boom that saw the development of numerous increasingly tall office and residential buildings, culminating in the completion of the city's current tallest building, Guangxi China Resources Tower, in 2020. The building, reaching a height of 402.7 m (1,321 ft), is the tallest building in Guangxi. Towards the early 2020s, the rate of construction of new skyscrapers has slowed down, with construction on the city's next supertall skyscraper, Skyfame Center Landmark Tower, on hold since 2022.

As of 2025, Nanning has a total of 93 skyscrapers above 150 m (492 ft) in height, 36 of which are taller than 200 m (656 ft); thus, Nanning is among the top twenty cities with the most skyscrapers. In addition, Nanning has six supertall skyscrapers, and is hence tied with Changsha, Hong Kong, Kuala Lumpur, and Moscow as the city with the ninth-most supertall buildings in the world. Out of those cities, Nanning has the smallest urban area population.

Nanning is a hilly city, with forested hills providing a backdrop to the city's tall buildings. The city's tallest buildings are primarily split between the district of Qingxiu and Wuxiang New Area. The peak of the skyline in Qingxiu is formed from four supertalls skyscrapers, including Guangxi China Resources Tower, in close proximity.

== Tallest buildings ==
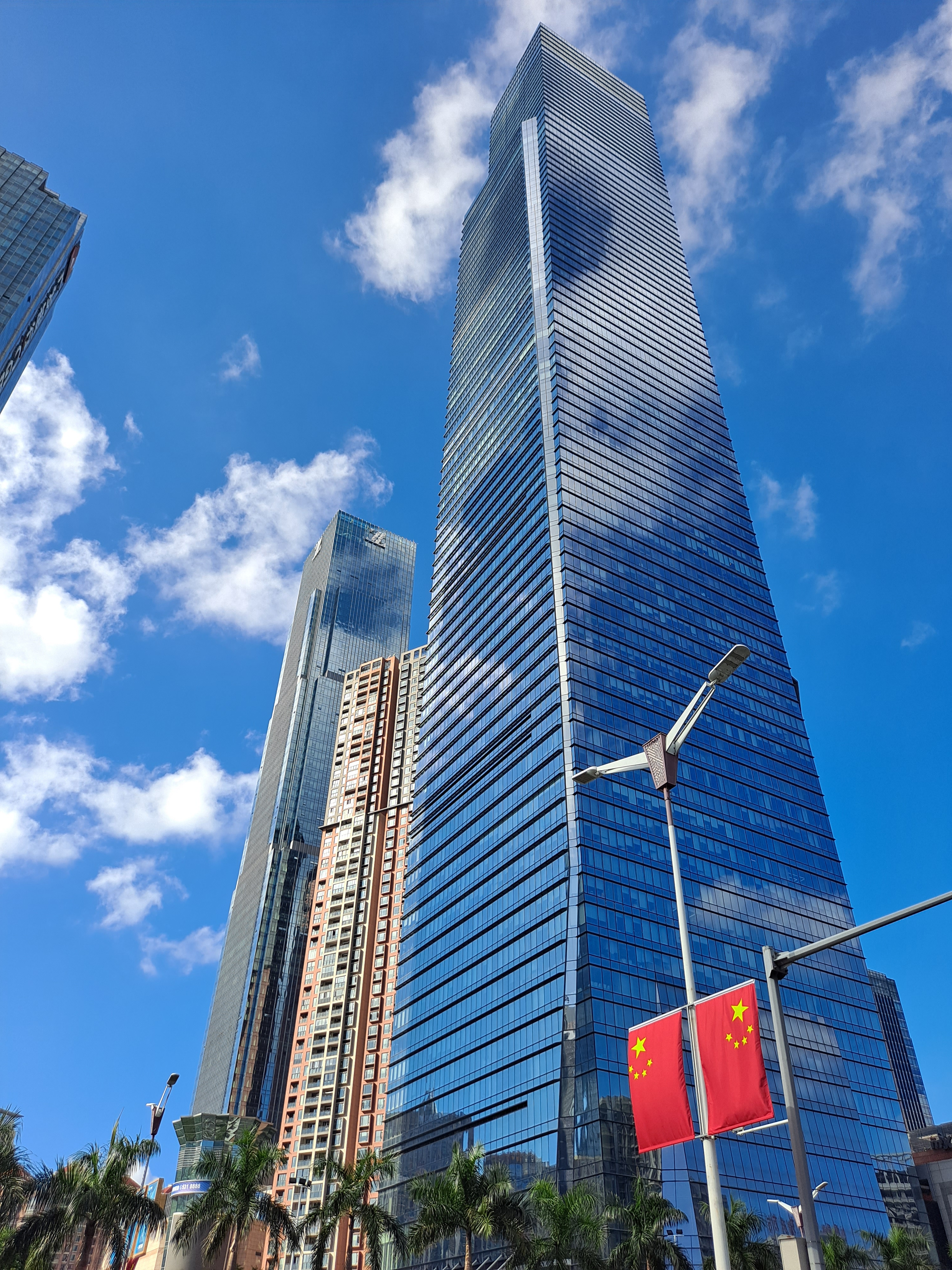
Guangxi China Resources Tower, the tallest building in Nanning

This lists ranks completed skyscrapers in Nanning that stand at least 200 m (656 ft) tall as of June 2025, based on standard height measurement. This includes spires and architectural details but does not include antenna masts. The “Year” column indicates the year of completion.

Was the tallest building in Nanning upon completion

Rank	Building	Height	Floors	Use	Year	Notes
1	Guangxi China Resources Tower	402.7 m	86	Mixed-use	2020	Tallest building in Nanning
2	Nanning Logan Century 1	381.3 m	82	Mixed-use	2018	
3	Guangxi Financial Investment Center	330 m	67	Office	2021	Tallest office-only building in Nanning
4	Guangxi Finance Plaza	321 m	68	Mixed-use	2017	
5	Jiuzhou International Tower	318 m	71	Office	2017	
6	Guangxi Wealth Financial Center	310.8 m	70	Office	2019	
7	Logan International Headquarters Tower 1	278 m	58	Office	2018	
8	Diwang International Commerce Center	276 m	54	Mixed-use	2006	
9	Boland World Financial Center 1	268 m	53	Office	2021	
10	Hangyang Sino Plaza 1	231.7 m	53	Mixed-use	2018	
11	Hangyang Sino Plaza 3	231.7 m	53	Mixed-use	2018	
12	Sankee Plaza	231 m	50	Office	2014	
13	KWG International Plaza	228.1 m	50	Office	2018	
14	Hangyang Sino Plaza 2	225.7 m	50	Mixed-use	2018	
15	Liyuan Skyline City	221.9 m	57	Office	2013	
16	Science and Technology Park Headquarters C3	220 m	41	Hotel	2019	
17	Park Lane Manor 6	220 m	60	Residential	2016	Joint-tallest residential-only building in Nanning
18	Park Lane Manor 5	220 m	60	Residential	2016	Joint-tallest residential-only building in Nanning
19	Nanhu Mingdu Plaza	218 m	47	Office	2013	
20	Qingxiu Wanda Mansion 1	216.4 m	60	Residential	2015	
21	Qingxiu Wanda Mansion 2	216.4 m	60	Residential	2015	
22	GIG International Financial Center	213.5 m	43	Office	2019	
23	Yuda Group Headquarters Tower 1	210 m	50	Office	2018	
24	Greenland Center Tower 8	210 m	47	Office	2017	
25	DK International Building	209 m	32	Office	2022	
26	Greenland Central Plaza	204 m	44	Office	2024	
27	Chengwang Cullinan International Center	203.3 m	39	Office	2024	
28	Triumph One #1	202.9 m	47	Residential	2017	
29	Triumph One #2	202.9 m	47	Residential	2017	
30	Triumph One #3	200.3 m	46	Residential	2017	
31	Triumph One #4	200.3 m	46	Residential	2017	
32	Boland World Financial Center 2	200 m	45	Office	2021	
33	Qingxiu Wanda Plaza Office Tower 3	200 m	47	Office	2015	
34	Qingxiu Wanda Plaza Office Tower 2	200 m	47	Office	2015	
35	Qingxiu Wanda Plaza Office Tower 1	200 m	47	Office	2015	
36	Qingxiu Wanda Plaza Office Tower 4	200 m	47	Office	2016	

== Tallest under construction or proposed ==
=== Under construction ===
This lists ranks skyscrapers that are under construction in Nanning that are expected to be at least 200 m (656 ft) tall as of June 2025, based on standard height measurement. The “Year” column indicates the expected year of completion. Buildings that are on hold are not included.

Rank	Building	Height	Floors	Use	Year	Notes
1	Oriental Zunfu	221.4 m	40	Office	2025	
2	Guimin Investment Headquarters Tower 1	211 m	39	Office	2025	

=== Proposed ===
This lists ranks proposed skyscrapers in Nanning that are expected to be at least 200 m (656 ft) tall as of June 2025, based on standard height measurement, including buildings on hold.

Building	Height	Floors	Use	Status	Notes
Nanning Center West Tower	357 m	77	Office	Proposed	
Nanning Center East Tower	357 m	77	Mixed-use	Proposed	
ASEAN Guangxi Mayors Tower	353.4 m	80	Office	Proposed	
Skyfame Center Landmark Tower	346 m	72	Mixed-use	On hold	
Evergrande International Center A	320 m	68	Mixed-use	On hold	
Guangxi Nanning ASEAN Tower	300 m	79	Mixed-use	Proposed	
Science and Technology Park Headquarters A1	231 m	51	Office	Proposed	
Tsingtao Haier Union Square Tower 1	220.5 m	52	Office	On hold	
Wuxiang Shimao Center Tower 1	200 m	-	Office	On hold	

== Timeline of tallest buildings ==
Building	Image	Years as tallest	Height (m)	Floors
Nanning No. 2 Telecom Hinge Building		1999–2006	168	33
Diwang International Commerce Center		2006–2017	276	54
Guangxi Finance Plaza		2017–2018	321	68
Nanning Logan Century 1		2018–2020	381.3	82
Guangxi China Resources Tower		2020–present	402.7	86
