= List of cities with the most skyscrapers =

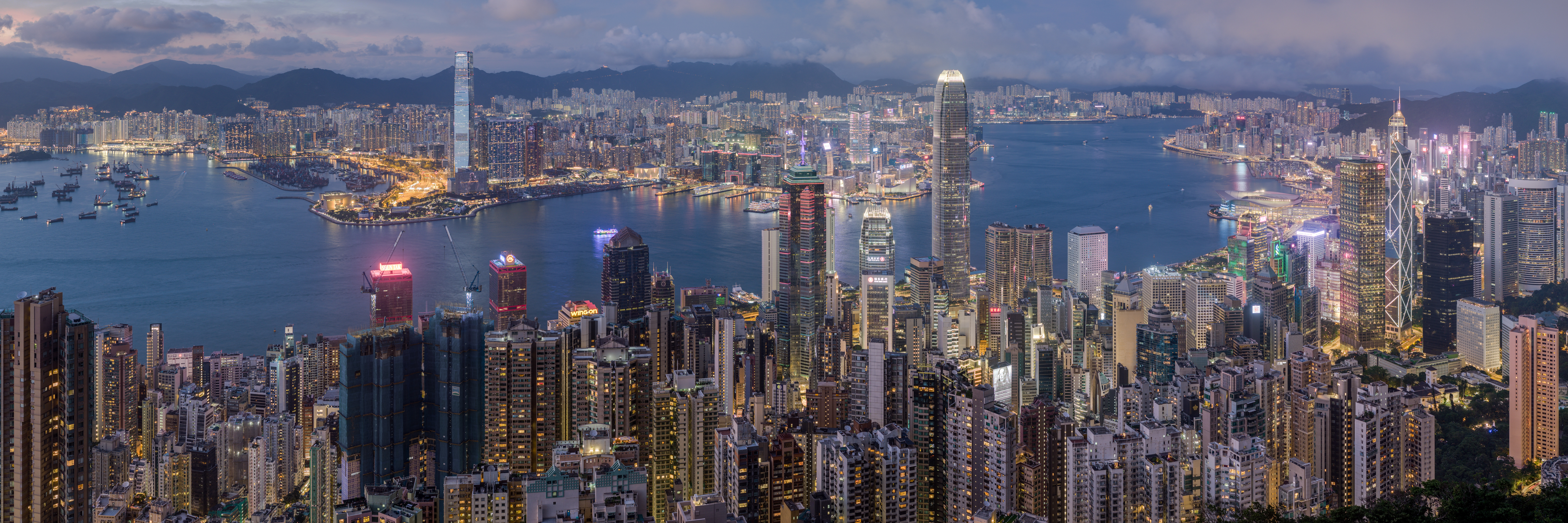
Hong Kong has over 550 skyscrapers, the most of any city in the world

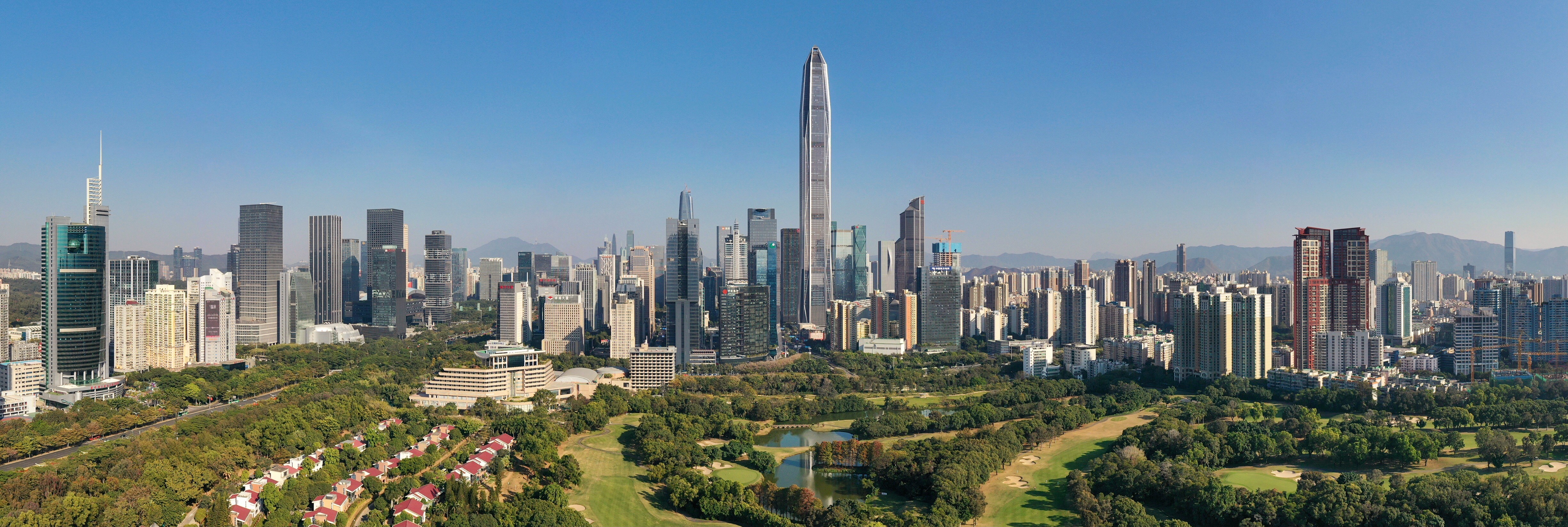
Shenzhen has over 400 skyscrapers, the second most of any city, and the most skyscrapers when measured by buildings taller than 200 m (656 ft)

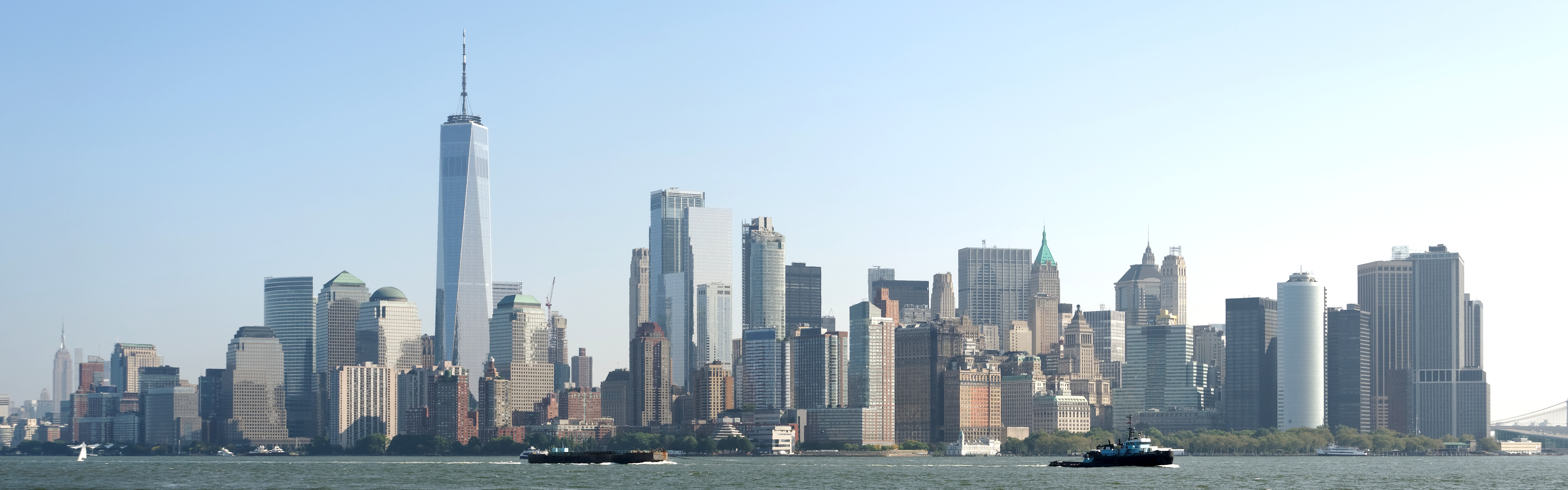
New York City, with over 300 skyscrapers, has the most in North America and the Western Hemisphere

This is a list of cities with most skyscrapers. For the purposes of this article, a skyscraper is defined as a continuously habitable high-rise building that is taller than 150 meters (492 feet). Historically, the term first referred to buildings with 10 to 20 floors in the 1880s. The definition shifted with advancing construction technology during the 20th century which allowed for taller buildings to be constructed.

Hong Kong is the city with the most skyscrapers, with a total of 569 such buildings as of 2026, followed by Shenzhen, New York City, Dubai, and Mumbai. Historically, New York City was the city with the most skyscrapers from the development of early skyscrapers until the early 2000s, when it was overtaken by Hong Kong. The country with the most cities that have at least 30 skyscrapers is China, with 28, followed by the United States, with five. With the exception of New York City, the ten cities with the most skyscrapers are all in Asia; four of them are in mainland China.

The title of the city with the most skyscrapers changes if alternative definitions for skyscraper are used. For example, when measured by the number of buildings taller than 200 m (656 ft), Shenzhen and Dubai rank higher than Hong Kong. The ranking also depends on whether the wider metropolitan areas are counted; some metropolitan areas, such as Metro Manila, have many skyscrapers spread across several cities. There are 21 cities with at least 100 skyscrapers taller than 150 m (492 ft). The first city to reach this milestone was New York City, and the most recent to do so was Moscow in 2025. If metropolitan areas are counted, Seoul and Metro Manila also surpass 100 skyscrapers.

New York City, with 324 skyscrapers, remains the city with the most in North America. Moscow has the most skyscrapers in Europe, with 100. Melbourne has the largest skyline out of any city in Oceania, with 79 skyscrapers. The Brazilian city of Balneário Camboriú has the most in South America, with 32, although São Paulo is the city with the most high-rises on the continent. The city with the most skyscrapers in Africa is Johannesburg, with five such buildings.

== Cities with the most skyscrapers ==
This list includes every city with more than 30 skyscrapers taller than 150 metres (492 ft), as of October 2026. Unless noted, the source for each figure is from Skyscraper Center database, which is managed by the Council on Vertical Urbanism (CVU). The CVU's figures may undercount a city's actual number of skyscrapers, and are unreliable for many non-Western cities due to incomplete data on high-rise buildings.

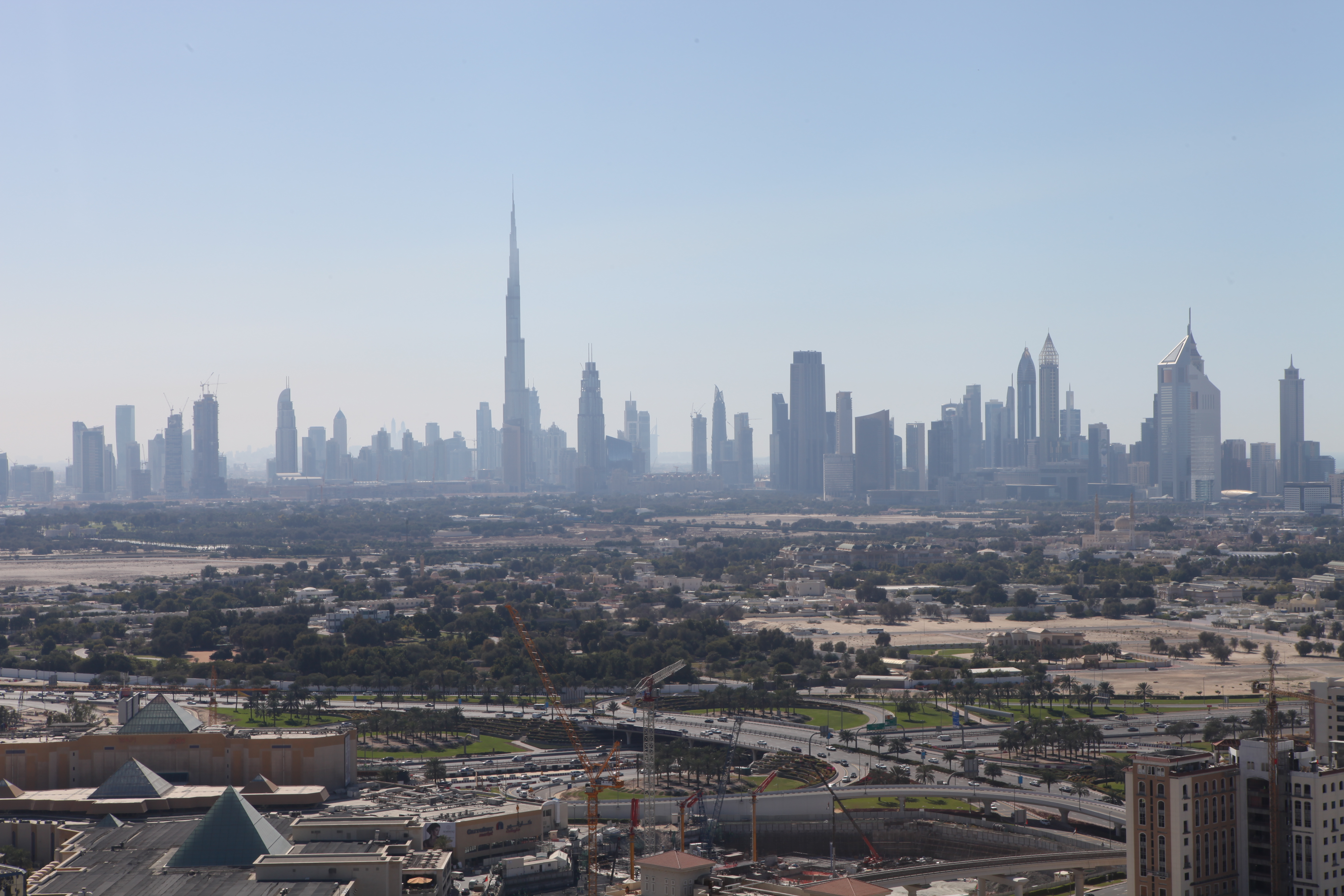
Dubai has the most skyscrapers of any city in the Middle East, and the tallest building in the world, the Burj Khalifa

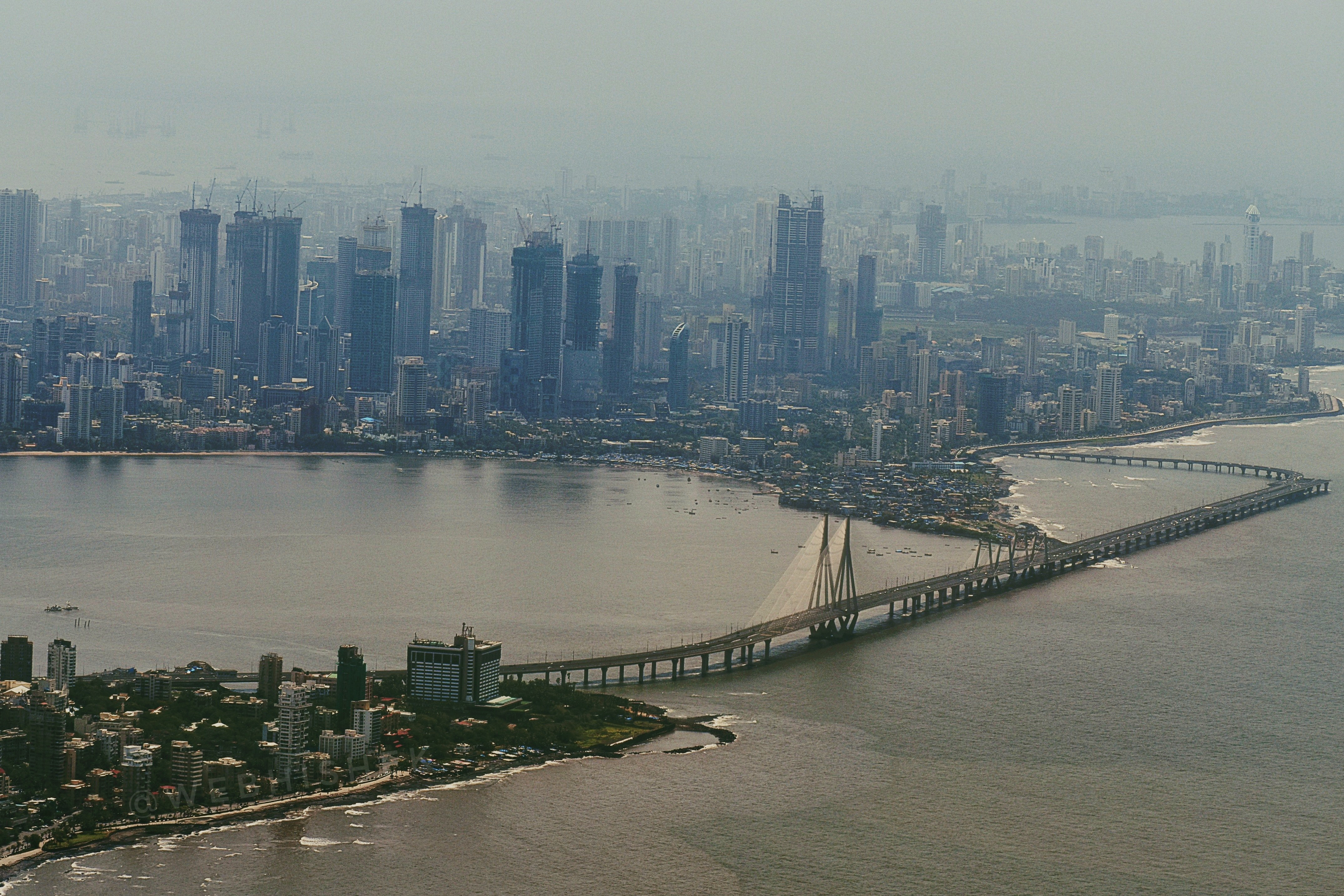
Mumbai has the 5th highest number of skyscrapers in the world, and the most skyscrapers of any city in South Asia by a wide margin

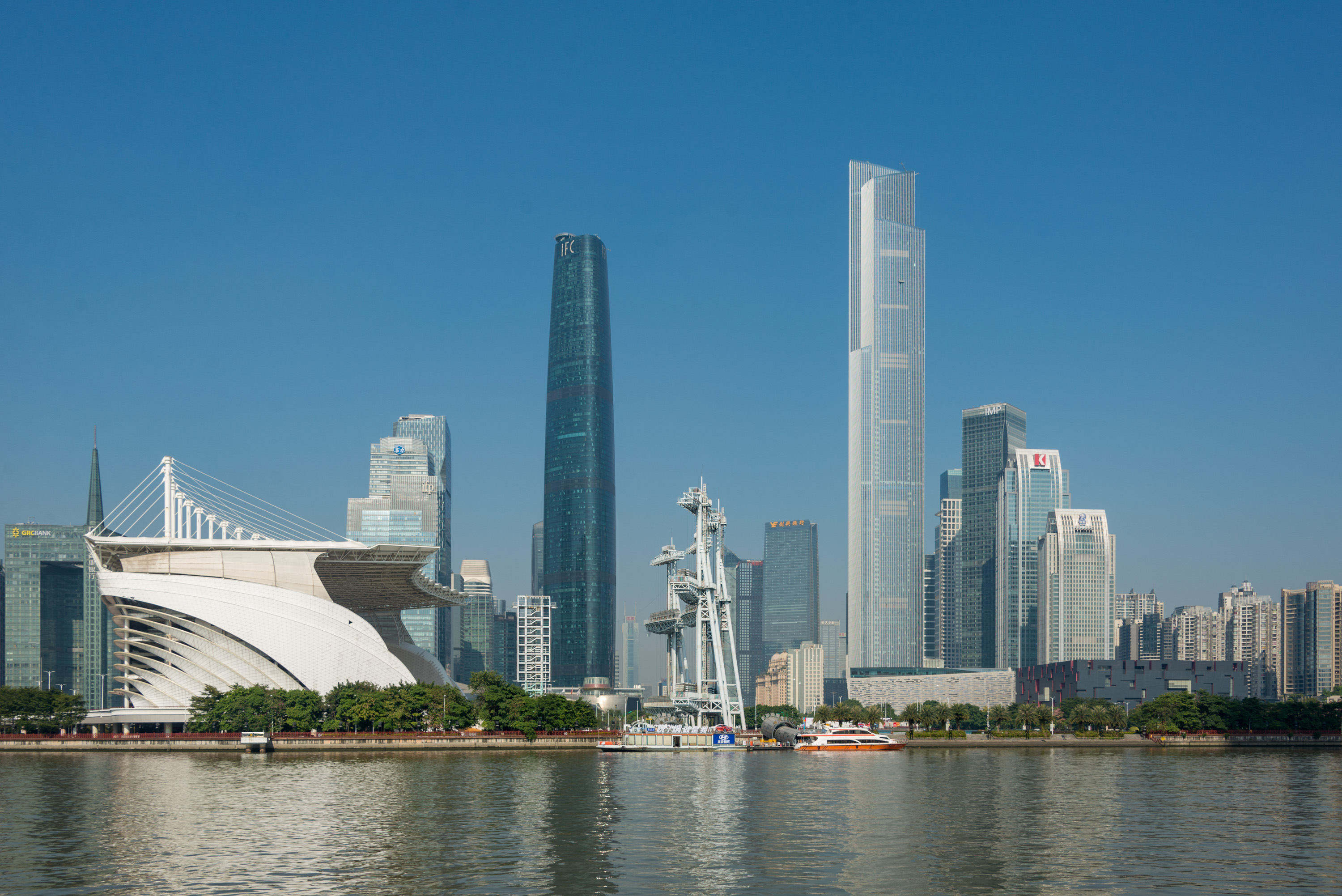
Guangzhou is part of the Pearl River Delta alongside Hong Kong and Shenzhen; the urban agglomeration has over 1,000 skyscrapers

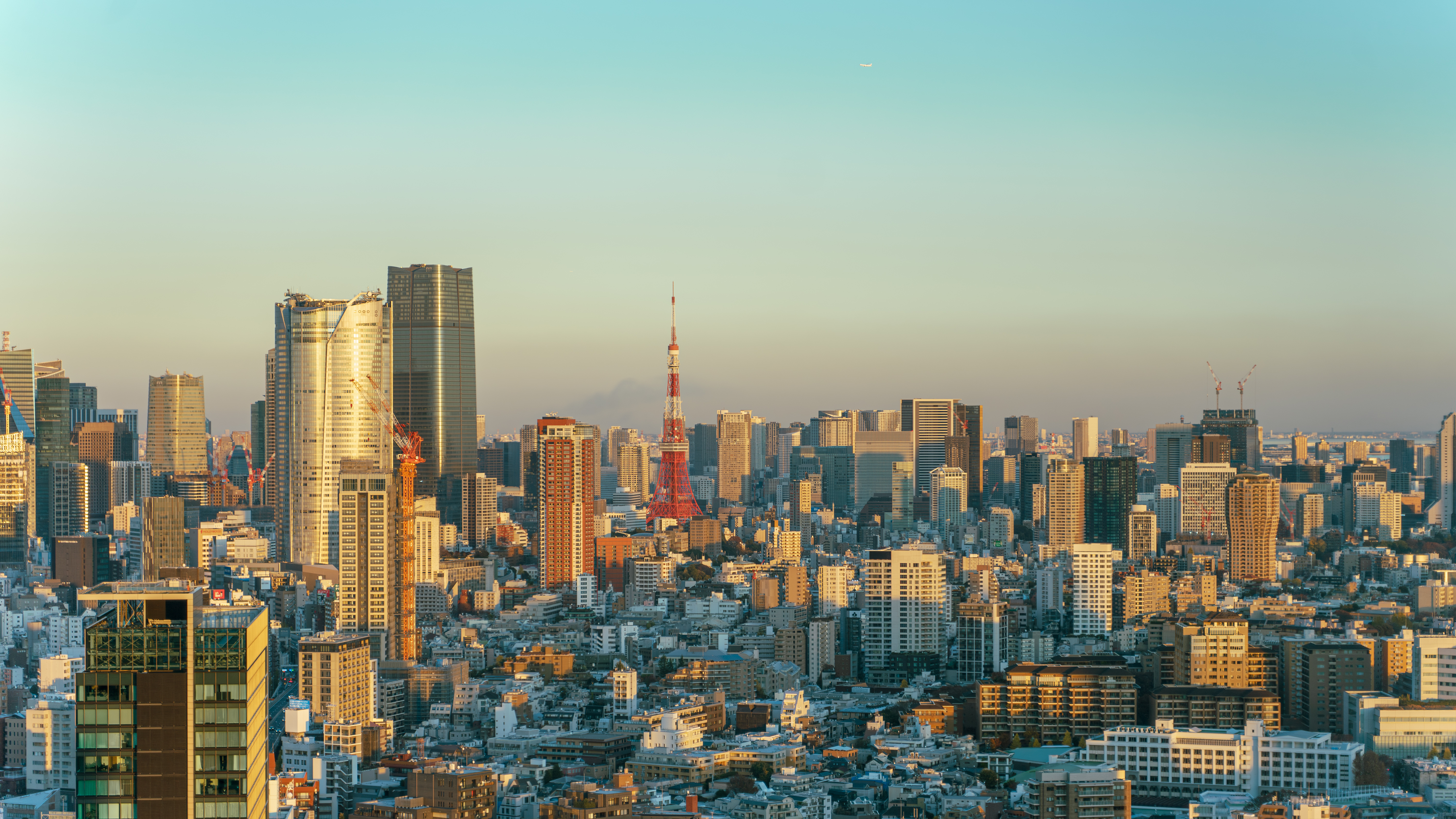
Tokyo is the city with the most skyscrapers in East Asia outside of China

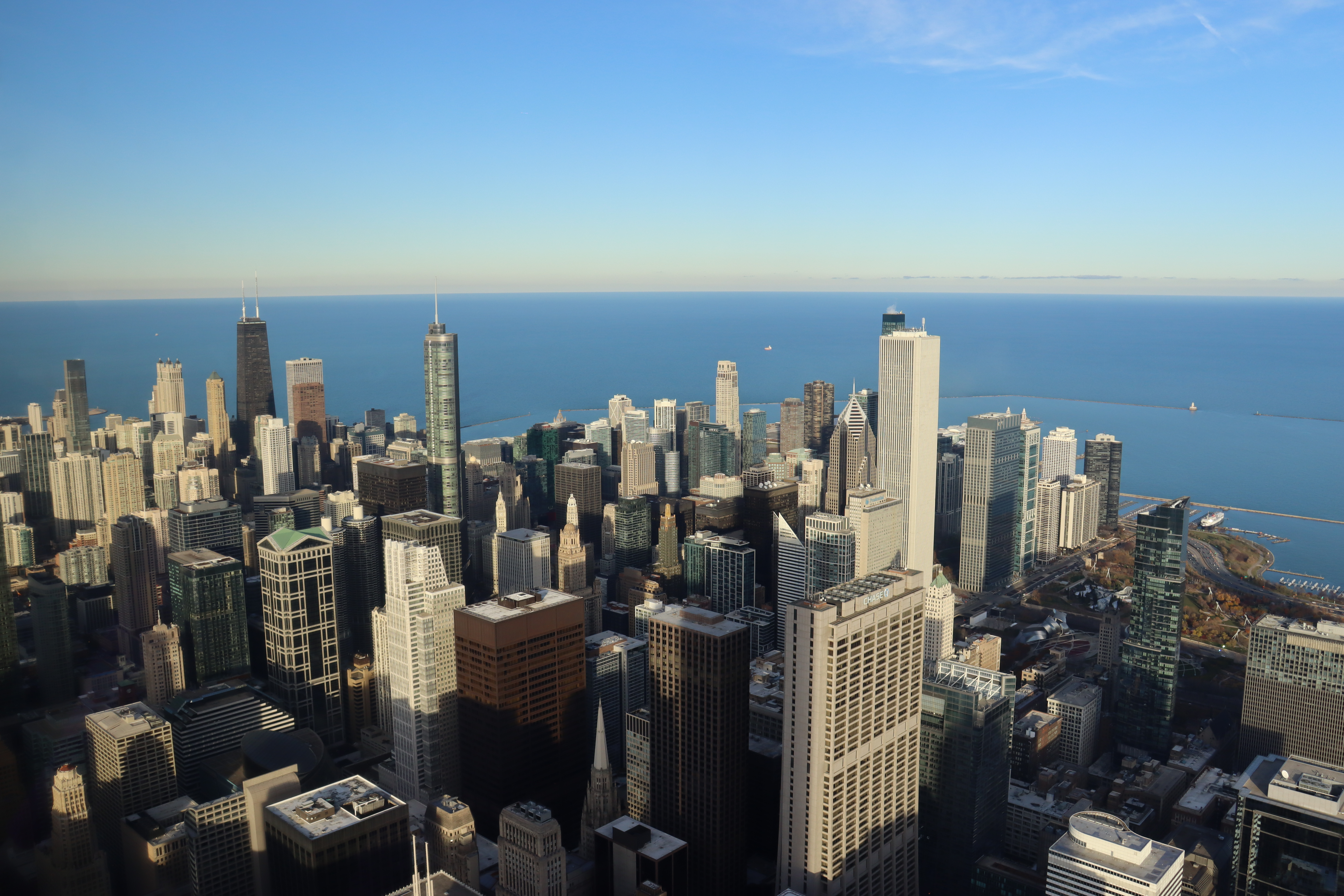
From the 1920s to the 1990s, Chicago had the second-most skyscrapers in the world

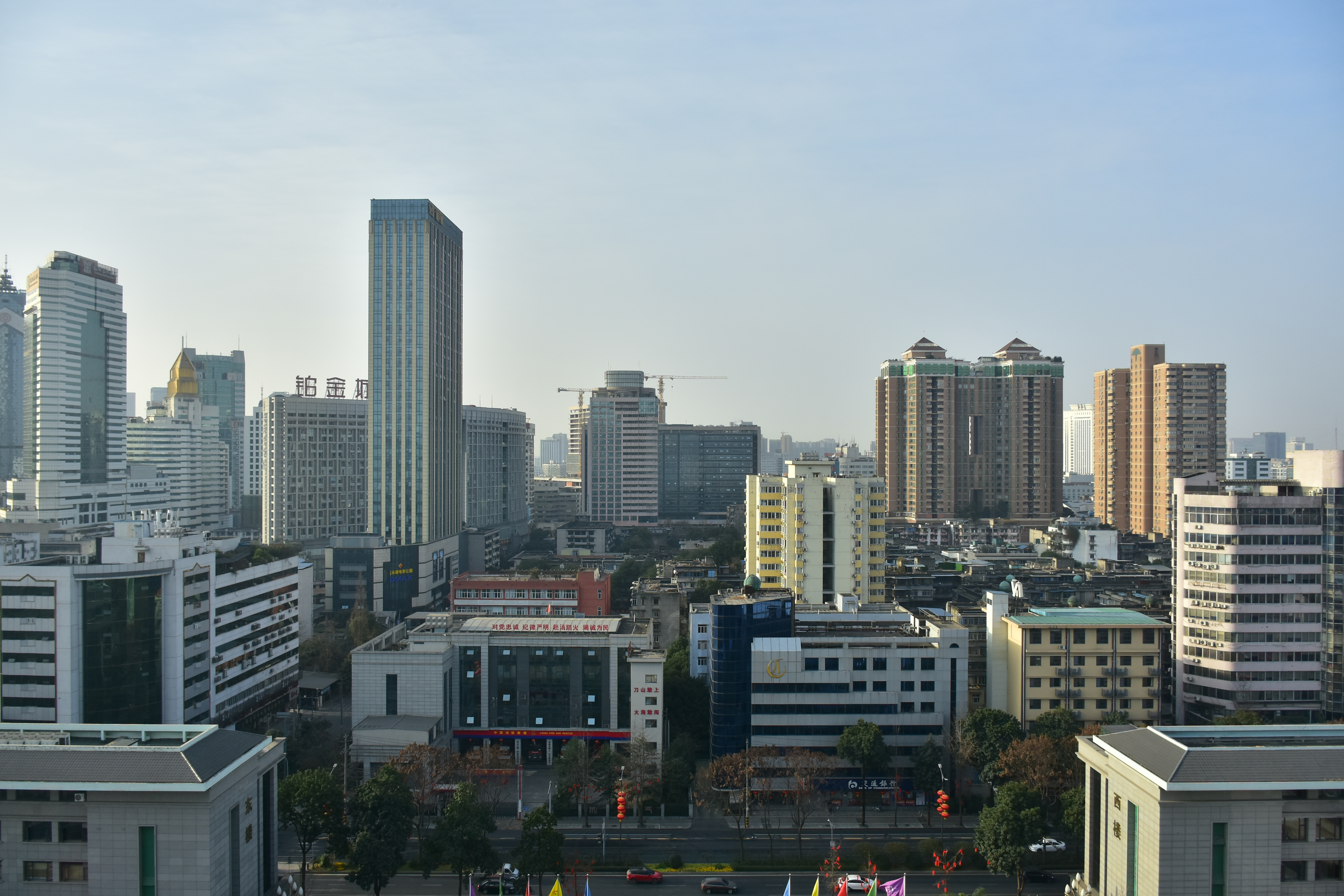
Chengdu has the most skyscrapers of any city without a supertall skyscraper

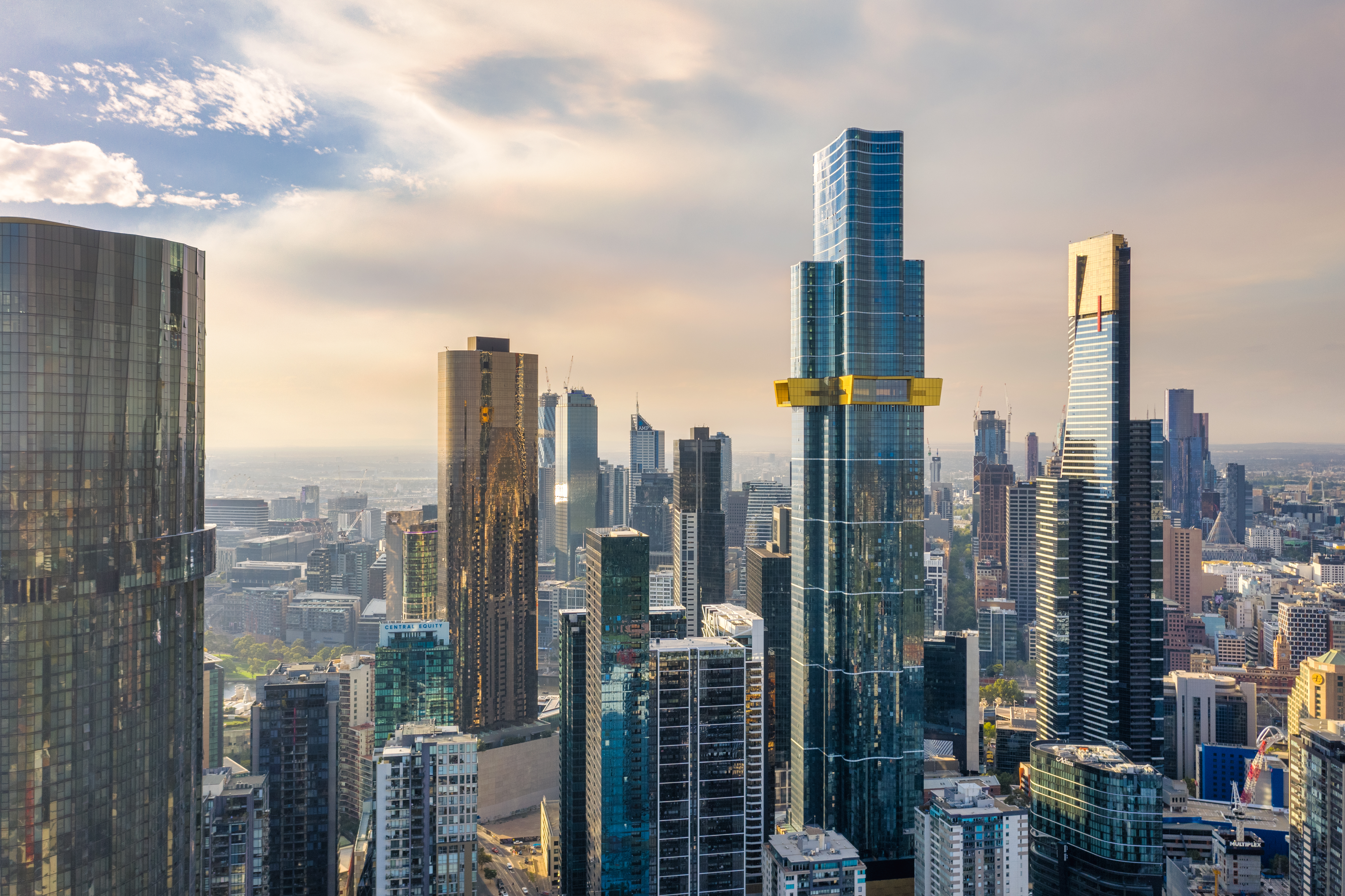
Melbourne has the most skyscrapers in Oceania, and is the southernmost city with over 30 skyscrapers

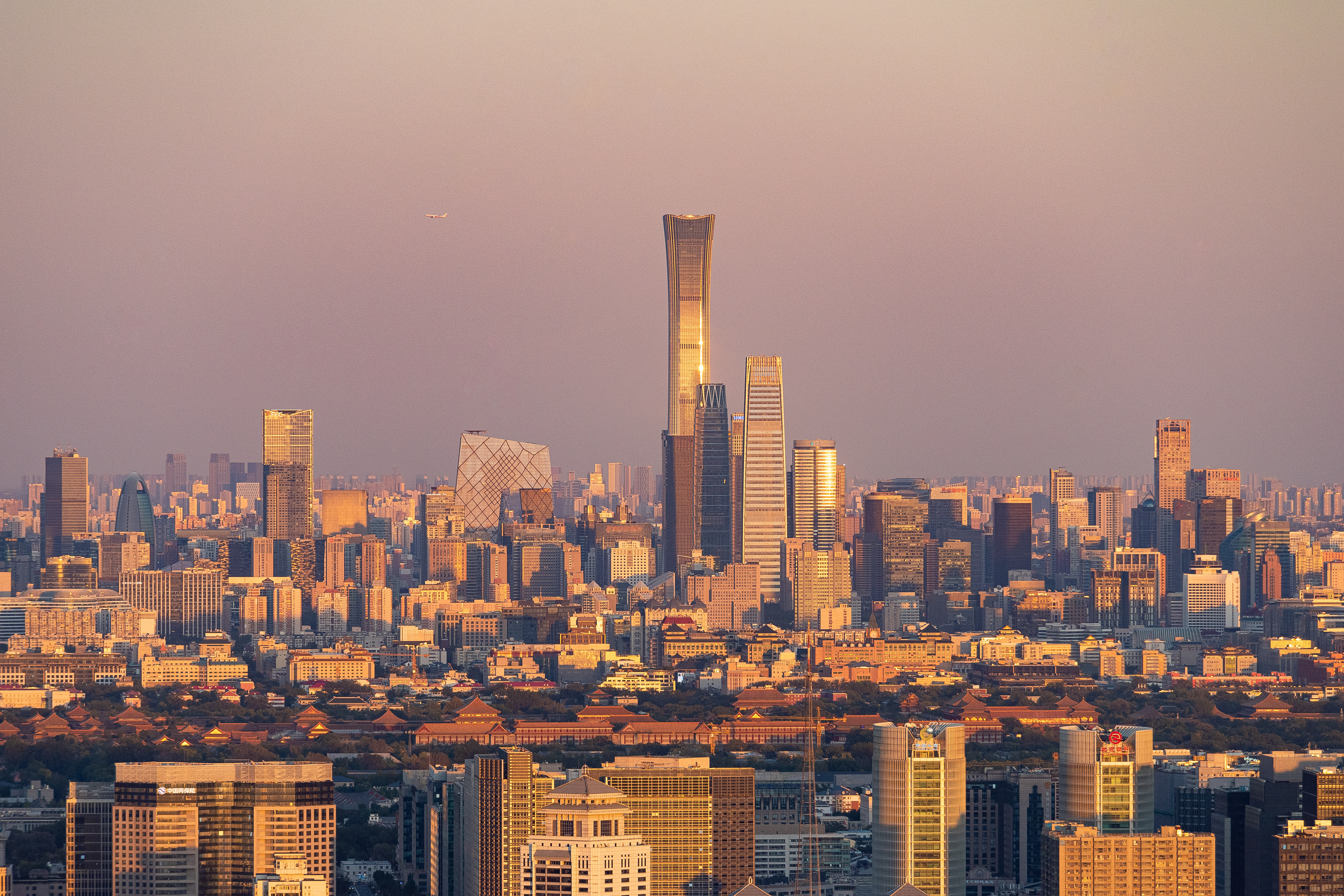
Despite being China's capital and second-largest city, Beijing ranks 13th in mainland China for number of skyscrapers

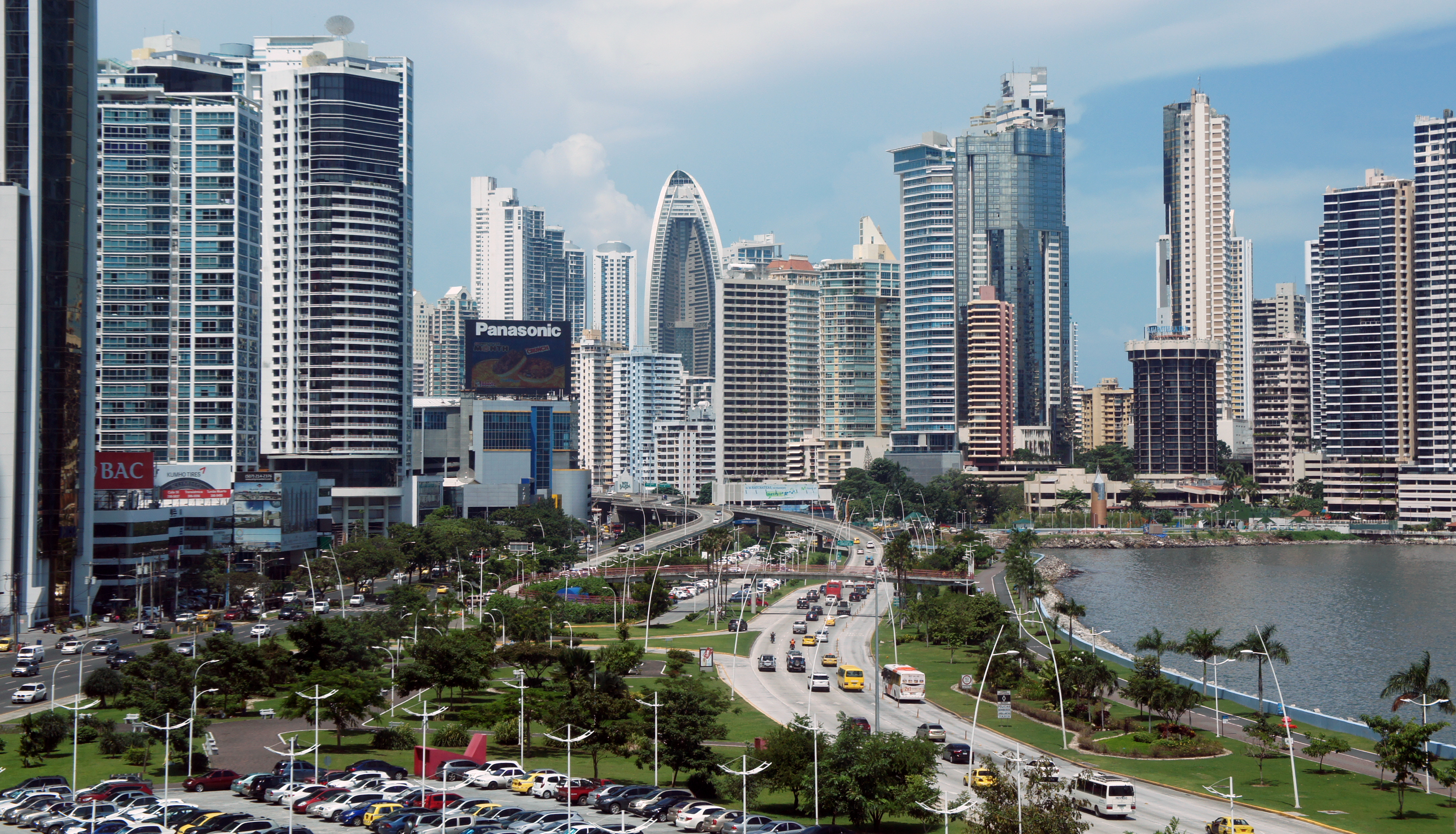
Panama City has the most skyscrapers of any city in Central America and all of Latin America

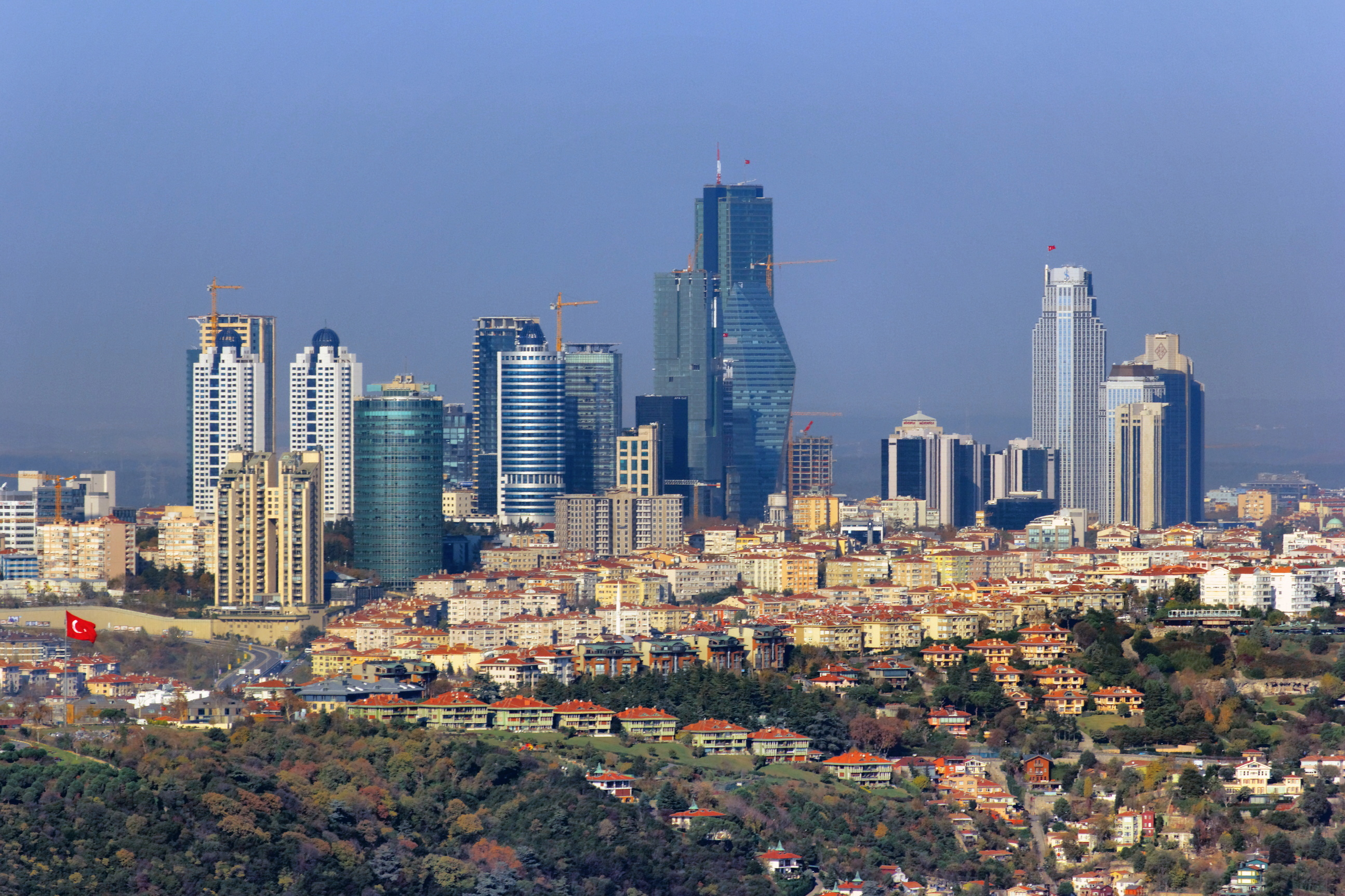
Istanbul has skyscrapers on both sides of the Bosporus, making it the only city to have skyscrapers on two continents, Asia and Europe

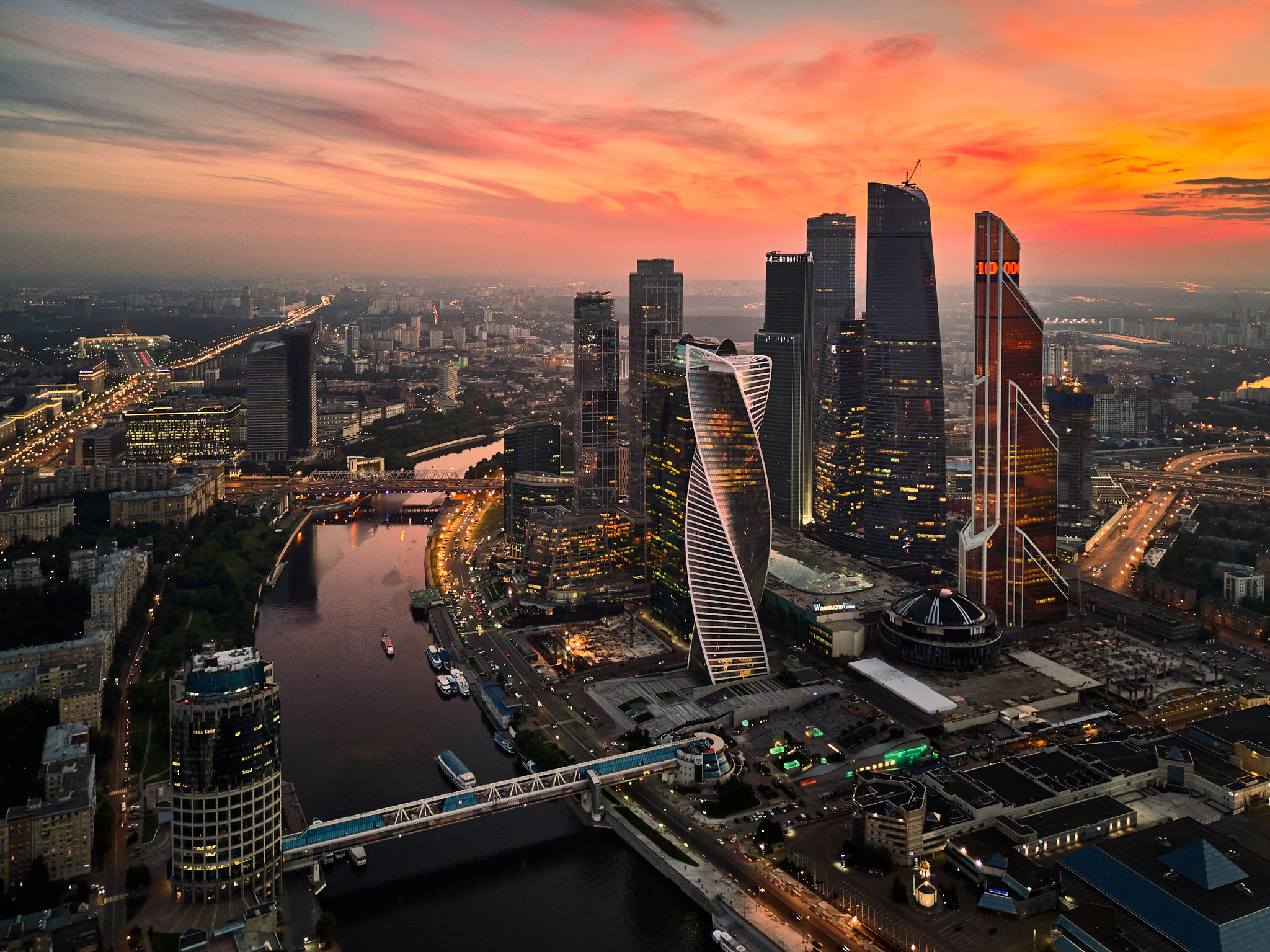
Moscow, with 100 skyscrapers, has the most in Europe

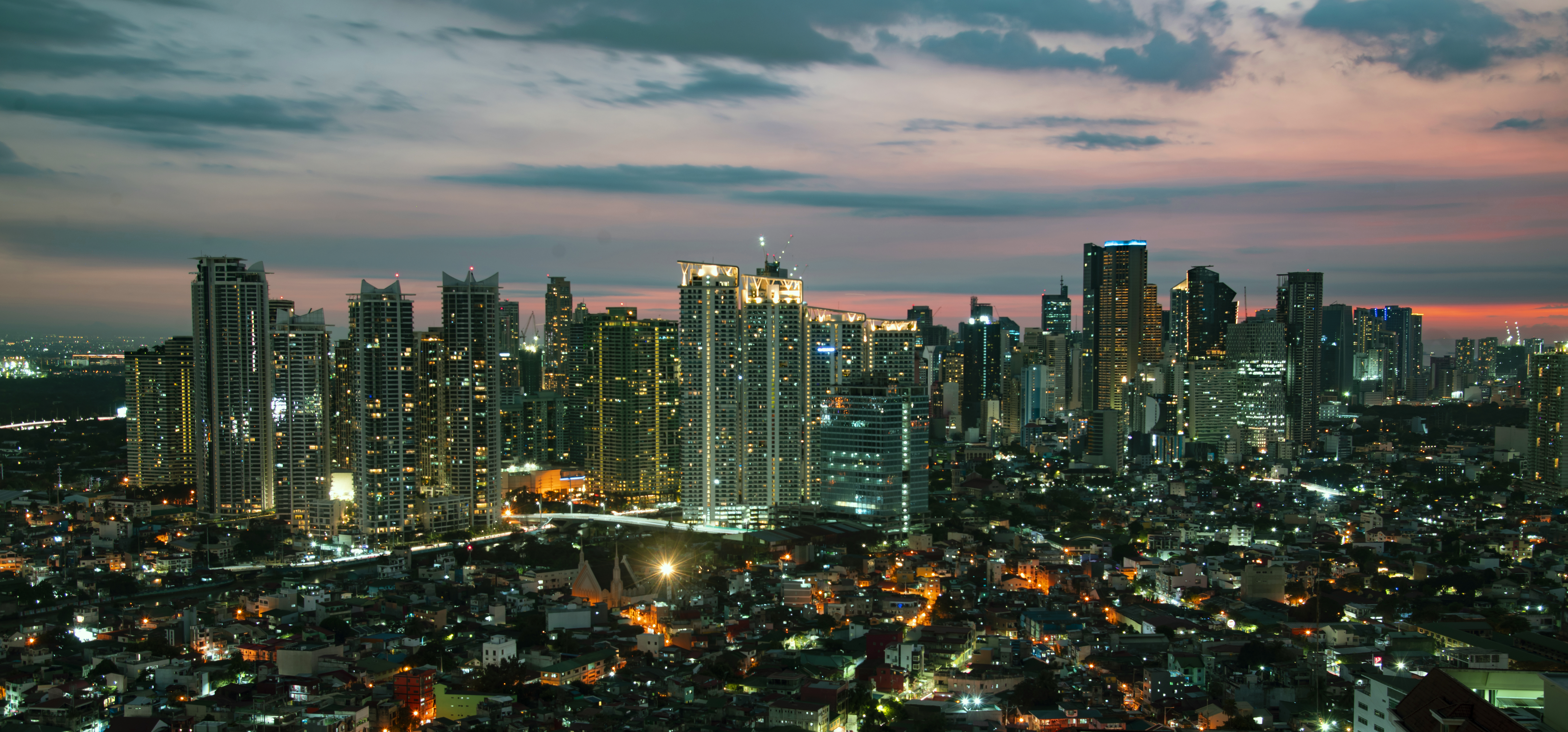
Makati, with 55 skyscrapers, makes up less than half of the total number of skyscrapers in Metro Manila

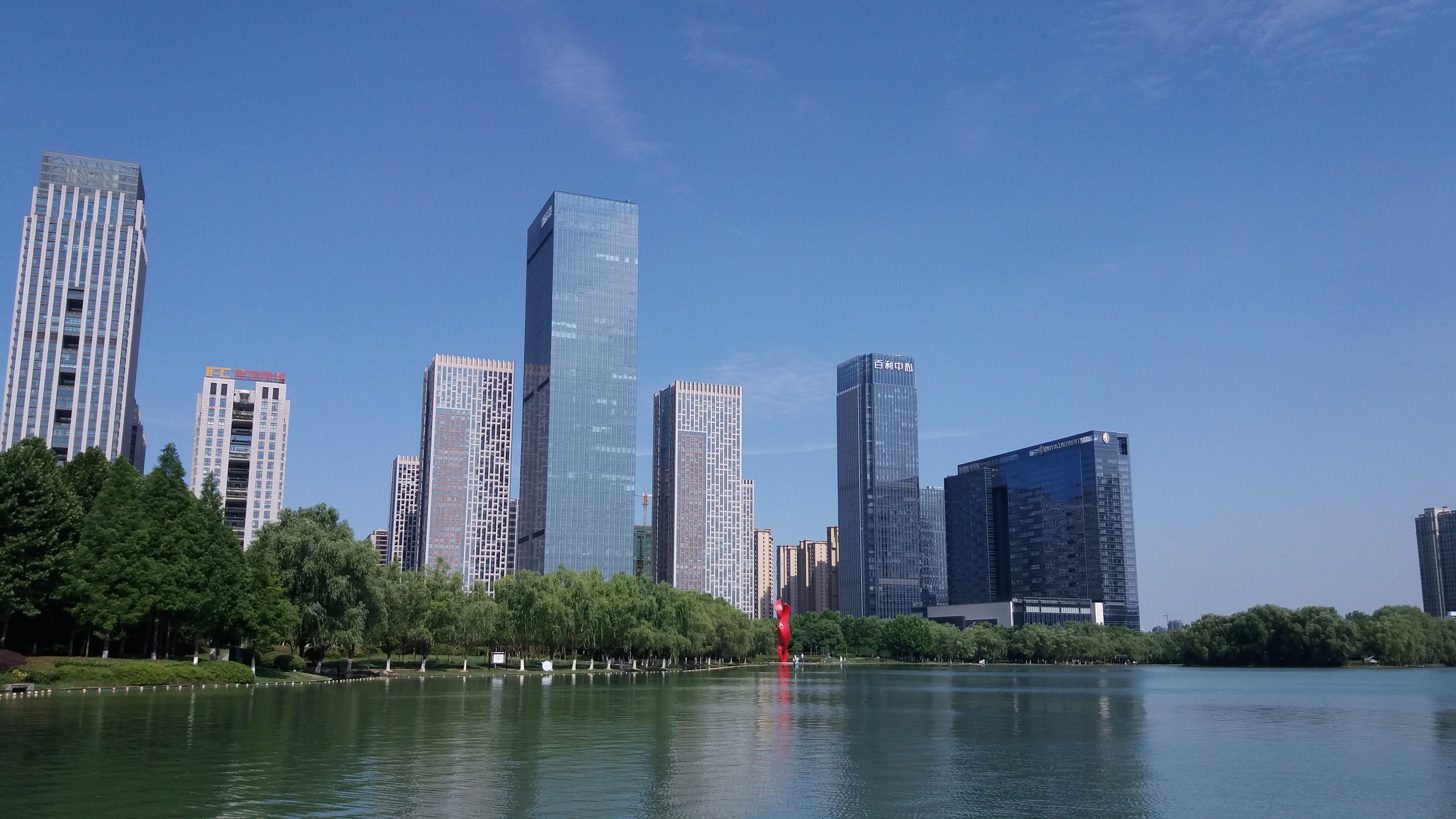
Hefei is one of 16 cities in China with at least 50 skyscrapers

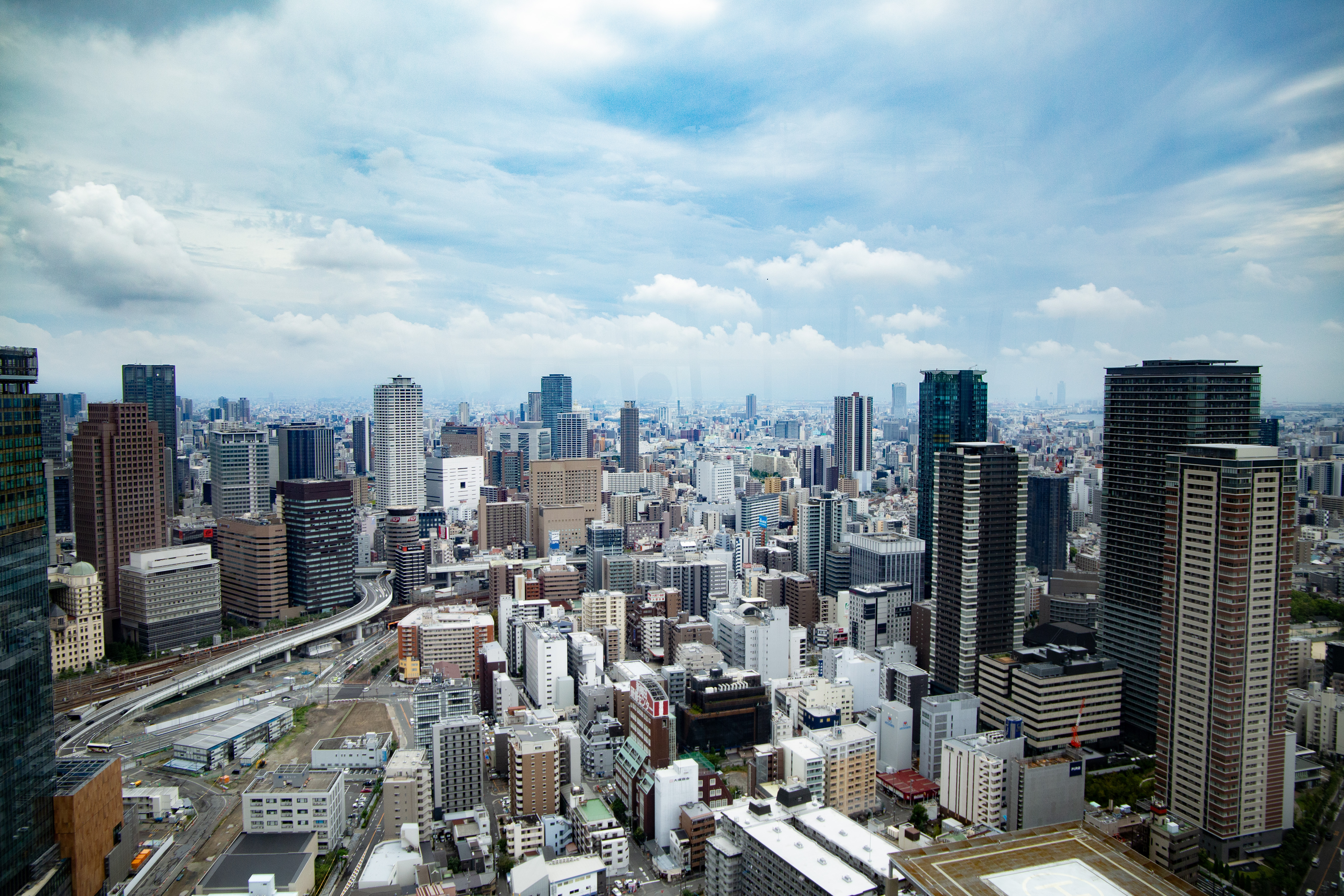
Osaka has the second most skyscrapers in Japan

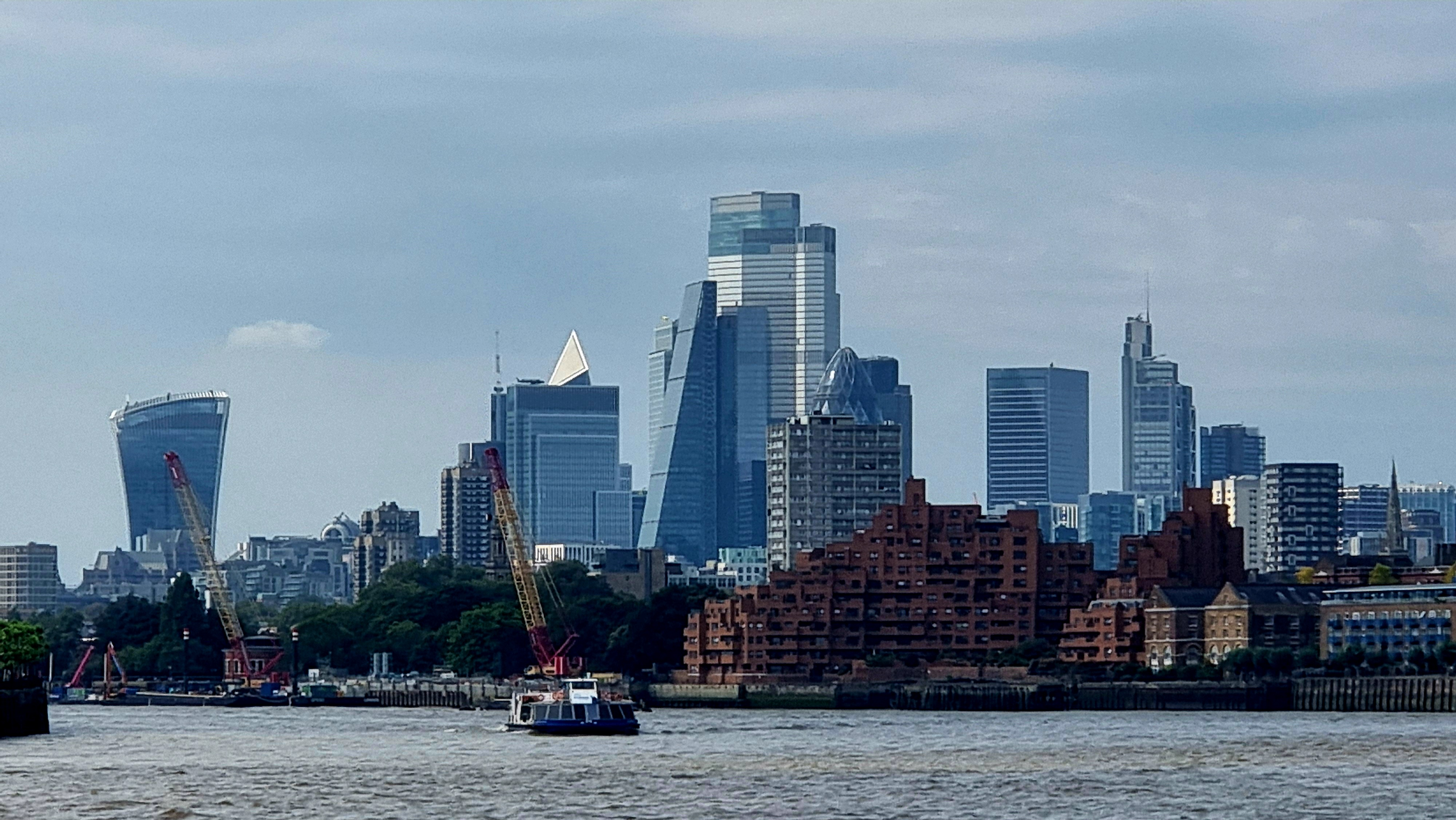
Before Brexit, London had the most skyscrapers in the European Union

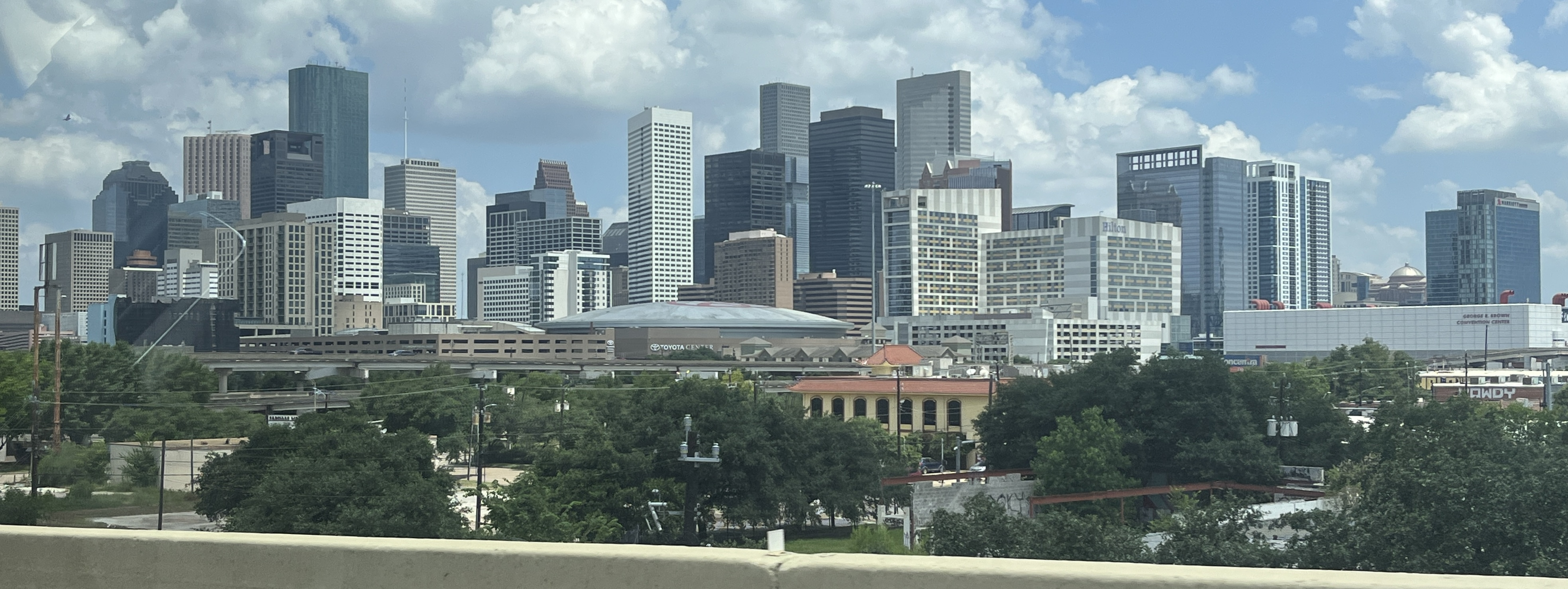
Houston has the most skyscrapers in the U.S. state of Texas

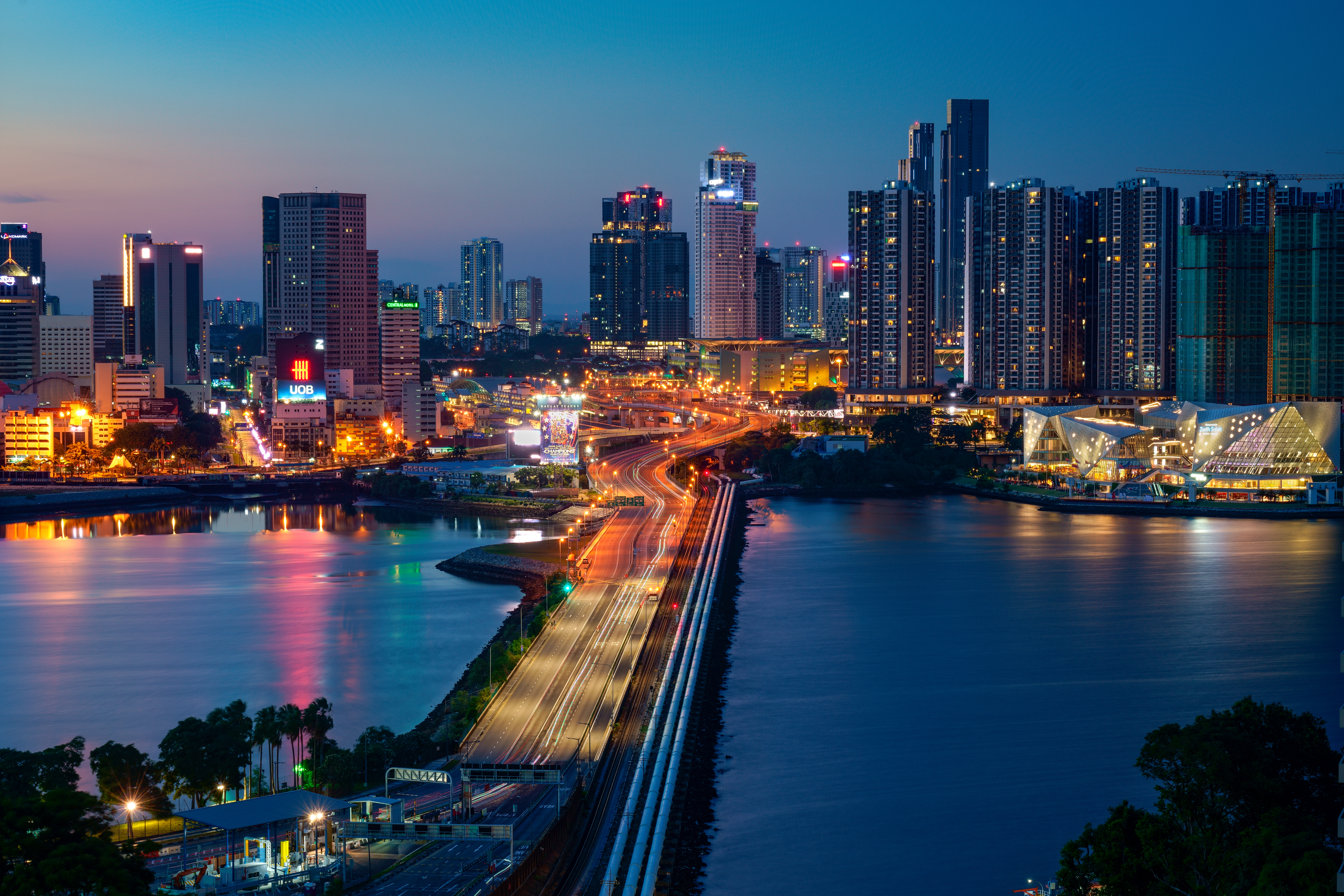
Malaysia is the least populous country to have three cities with at least 30 skyscrapers. Shown above is Johor Bahru

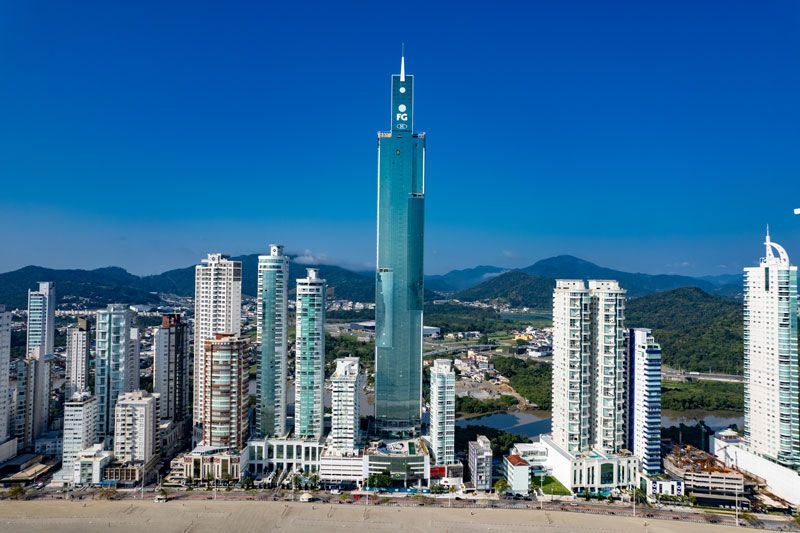
The resort city of Balneário Camboriú is the only city in South America with at least 30 skyscrapers

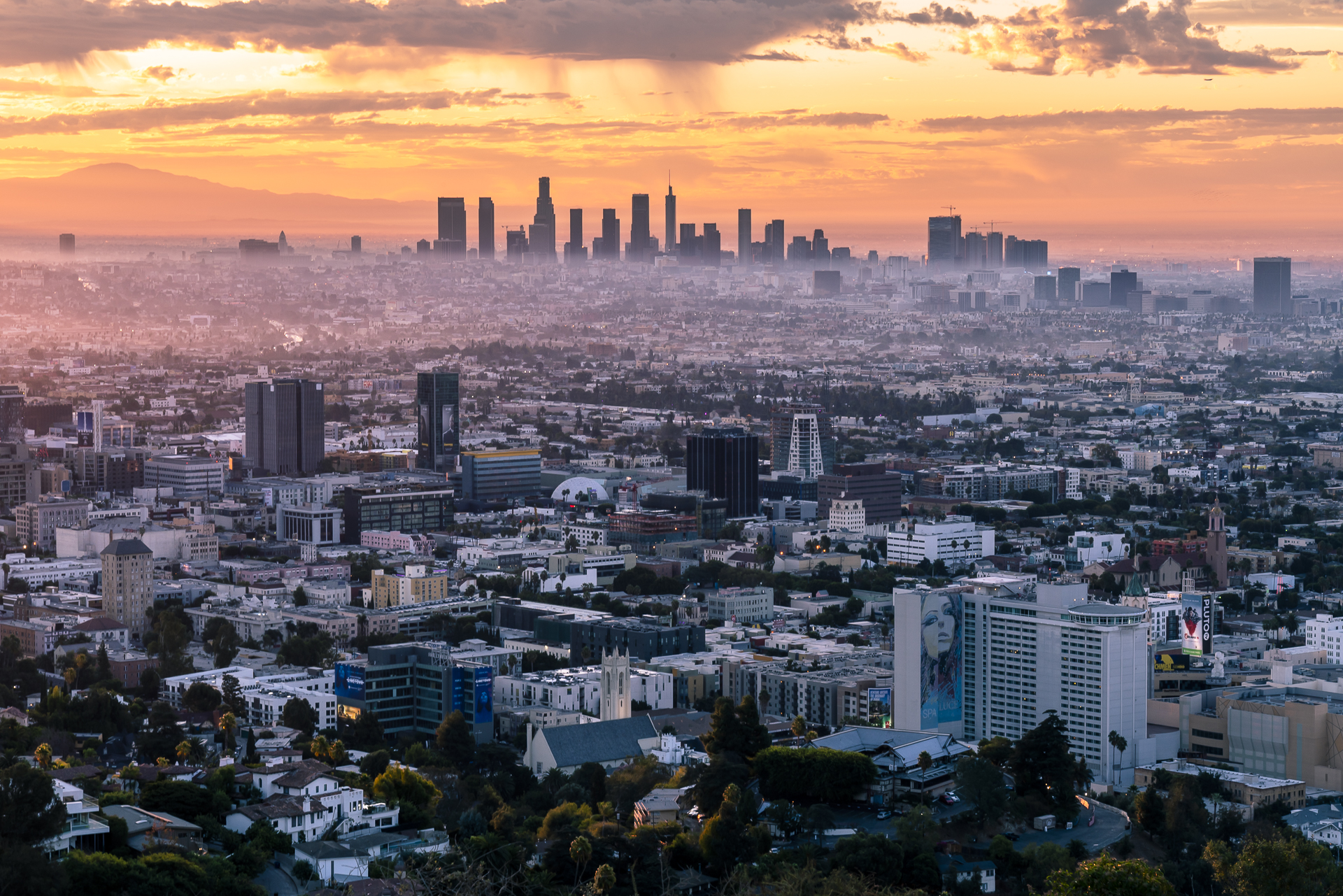
Los Angeles has the most skyscrapers in the U.S. state of California

Rank	City	Country	Image	No. of skyscrapers
1	Hong Kong	Hong Kong		569
2	Shenzhen	China		471
3	New York City	United States		324
4	Dubai	United Arab Emirates		289
5	Mumbai	India		244 (Note: This figure is from the corresponding linked article. It includes topped-out buildings that are not fully completed.)
6	Guangzhou	China		212
7	Wuhan	China		209
8	Shanghai	China		206
9	Bangkok	Thailand		204 (Note: This figure is from the corresponding linked article.)
10	Kuala Lumpur	Malaysia		201
11	Tokyo	Japan		200
12	Chongqing	China		156
13	Singapore	Singapore		140
14	Chicago	United States		137
15	Chengdu	China		136
16	Jakarta	Indonesia		117
17	Toronto	Canada		111
18	Moscow	Russia		108
19	Shenyang	China		101
20	Hangzhou	China		100
21	Nanning	China		94
22	Changsha	China		92
23	Seoul	South Korea		86
24	Nanjing	China		82
25	Melbourne	Australia		80
26	Tianjin	China		79
27	Busan	South Korea		77
28	Miami	United States		73
29	Beijing	China		70
30	Panama City	Panama		68
31	Hyderabad	India	Kokapet_Skyline_from_Neopolis_–_Evening_View	65
32	Zhuhai	China		62
33	Dalian	China		59
34	Makati	Philippines		59
35	Doha	Qatar		57
36	Istanbul	Turkey		57
37	Suzhou	China		54
38	Sydney	Australia		53 (Note: The CVU counts Sydney and Parramatta as separate cities. This figure is obtained from combining its figure for Sydney and Parramatta.)
39	Incheon	South Korea		50
40	Hefei	China		49
41	Jinan	China		46
42	Osaka	Japan		46
43	Abu Dhabi	United Arab Emirates		45
44	Foshan	China		43
45	London	United Kingdom		43
46	Nanchang	China		41
47	Xiamen	China		41
48	Houston	United States		40
49	Qingdao	China		40
50	Guiyang	China		39
51	Penang (Note: Penang is a state that is composed of two cities – George Town and Seberang Perai. The city of George Town may sometimes be confusingly referred to as 'Penang', as it is on The Skyscraper Center website, instead of the state as a whole.)	Malaysia		38
52	Thane	India		36
53	Johor Bahru	Malaysia		35
54	Kunming	China		35
55	Mexico City	Mexico		35
56	Macau	Macau		33
57	Balneário Camboriú	Brazil		32
58	Los Angeles	United States		32
59	Ningbo	China		32
60	Xi'an	China		30
61	Riyadh	Saudi Arabia		30
62	Wuxi	China		30

== Metropolitan areas with the most skyscrapers ==
This list ranks metropolitan areas with the most completed skyscrapers that are taller than 150 m (492 ft) as of August 2026. Metropolitan areas with over 50 skyscrapers are shown. Unless indicated in the above list or otherwise, the number of skyscrapers is given by the Council on Vertical Urbanism (CVU).

Rank	Metropolitan area	Country	Image	No. of skyscrapers	Cities included (with nos. of skyscrapers)
1	Hong Kong	China		569	Hong Kong (569)
2	Shenzhen	China		471	Shenzhen (471)
3	New York City	United States		348	New York City (324), Jersey City (22), Fort Lee (2)
4	Dubai	United Arab Emirates		316	Dubai (289), Sharjah (26), Ajman (1)
5	Mumbai	India		300	Mumbai (247), Thane (36), Navi Mumbai (17)
6	Kuala Lumpur	Malaysia		243	Kuala Lumpur (201), Petaling Jaya (13), Ampang Jaya (12), Shah Alam (6), Cyberjaya (4), Subang Jaya (4), Putrajaya (3)
7	Tokyo	Japan		230	Tokyo (200), Kawasaki (10), Yokohama (9), Chiba (6), Saitama (2), Hachioji (1), Ichikawa (1), Kawaguchi (1)
8	Guangzhou	China		212	Guangzhou (212)
9	Bangkok	Thailand		209	Bangkok (204), Nonthaburi (5)
10	Wuhan	China		209	Wuhan (209)
11	Shanghai	China		206	Shanghai (206)
12	Seoul	South Korea		167	Seoul (86), Incheon (50), Goyang (14), Gwangmyeong (6), Hwaseong (4), Anyang (2), Bucheon (2), Suwon (2), Seongnam (1)
13	Chongqing	China		156	Chongqing (156)
14	Chicago	United States		137	Chicago (137)
15	Chengdu	China		136	Chengdu (136)
16	Manila	Philippines		131	Makati (59), Taguig (19), Mandaluyong (18), Pasig (14), Quezon City (10), Manila (9), San Juan (2)
17	Toronto	Canada		126	Toronto (111), Vaughan (8), Mississauga (7)
18	Jakarta	Indonesia		124	Jakarta (117), Tangerang (5), Bekasi (2)
19	Moscow	Russia		108	Moscow (108)
20	Shenyang	China		101	Shenyang (101)
21	Hangzhou	China		100	Hangzhou (100)
22	Singapore	Singapore		100	Singapore (100)
23	Miami	United States		97	Miami (72), Sunny Isles Beach (17), Miami Beach (4), Fort Lauderdale (3), Hallandale Beach (1)
24	Nanning	China		94	Nanning (94)
25	Changsha	China		92	Changsha (92)
26	Busan	South Korea		82	Busan (77), Ulsan (5)
27	Nanjing	China		82	Nanjing (82)
28	Melbourne	Australia		79	Melbourne (79)
29	Tianjin	China		79	Tianjin (79)
30	Beijing	China		70	Beijing (70)
31	Panama City	Panama		68	Panama City (68)
32	Hyderabad	India	Kokapet_Skyline_from_Neopolis_–_Evening_View	65	Hyderabad (65)
33	Zhuhai	China		62	Zhuhai (62)
34	Dalian	China		59	Dalian (59)
35	Doha	Qatar		57	Doha (57)
36	Istanbul	Turkey		57	Istanbul (57)
37	Suzhou	China		54	Suzhou (54)
38	Osaka	Japan		53	Osaka (46), Kobe (6), Izumisano (1)
39	Sydney	Australia		53	Sydney (53)
40	Hefei	China		49	Hefei (49)
41	Jinan	China		46	Jinan (46)
42	Abu Dhabi	United Arab Emirates		45	Abu Dhabi (45)
43	Foshan	China		43	Foshan (43)
44	London	United Kingdom		43	London (43)
45	Tel Aviv	Israel		42	Tel Aviv (24), Ramat Gan (6), Bnei Brak (5), Petah Tikva (4), Givatayim (2), Bat Yam (1)
46	Nanchang	China		41	Nanchang (41)
47	Xiamen	China		41	Xiamen (41)
48	Houston	United States		40	Houston (40)
49	Qingdao	China		40	Qingdao (40)
50	Guiyang	China		39	Guiyang (39)
51	Taipei	Taiwan		39 (Note: This figure is from the linked page of Taipei's tallest buildings, which includes skyscrapers in both the municipalities of Taipei City and New Taipei City. The two municipalities form a contiguous urban area. The CVU's figure for each city is 15 and 12 respectively, for a combined total of 27.)	New Taipei City (23), Taipei (16)
52	Penang	Malaysia		38	Penang (38)
53	Johor Bahru	Malaysia		35	Johor Bahru (35)
54	Kunming	China		35	Kunming (35)
55	Balneário Camboriú	Brazil		33	Balneário Camboriú (32), Itapema (1)
56	Macau	Macau		33	Macau (33)
57	Los Angeles	United States		32	Los Angeles (32)
58	Mexico City	Mexico		32	Mexico City (30), Huixquilucan (2)
59	Ningbo	China		32	Ningbo (32)
60	Xi'an	China		32	Xi'an (32)
61	Riyadh	Saudi Arabia		30	Riyadh (30)
62	Vancouver	Canada		30	Burnaby (17), Vancouver (7), Coquitlam (4). New Westminster (1), Surrey (1)
63	Wuxi	China		30	Wuxi (30)

== Map of cities with the most skyscrapers ==
The following maps shows the location of every city and urban area with over 30 skyscrapers taller than 150 m (492 ft). Cities with over 100 skyscrapers are indicated by blue dots. Labels in italics indicate metropolitan areas with over 30 skyscrapers, but without any individual city that reaches that number. Cities in China and South Korea are labelled on the lower map due to the lack of space on the upper map.

Cities with at least 30 skyscrapers taller than 150 m (492 ft) as of 2026
Cities in Asia with at least 30 skyscrapers taller than 150 m (492 ft) as of 2026

== Cities with the most skyscrapers under construction ==
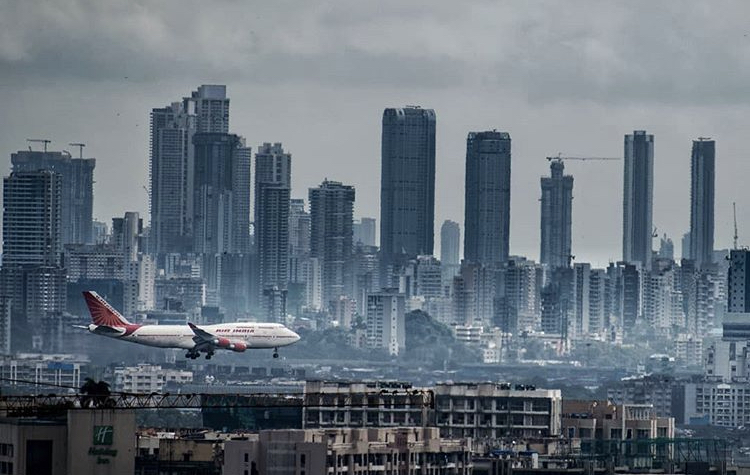
Mumbai has the highest number of skyscrapers under construction as of 2025.

This is a list which ranks cities that have at least 10 skyscrapers under construction that are taller than 150 m (492 ft) as of September 2025. Values without a citation or a link to the city's corresponding Wikipedia page indicate that the figure was obtained from the Council on Vertical Urbanism. (Note: The CVU’s "Explore Data" search function limits outputs to 25 buildings for free users. Figures higher than 25 skyscrapers were obtained by conducting separate queries of buildings under construction based on their intended purpose.) (Note: CVU figures without a "greater than" sign (≥) should still be taken as minimum values, as the CVU may not catalogue every skyscraper taller than 150 m (492) under construction.)

Rank	City	Country	Skyscrapers under construction
1	Mumbai	India	>300 (Note: This figure is from the corresponding linked article. It excludes buildings that are topped out.)
2	Hyderabad	India	230
3	Gurgaon	India	170
4	Moscow	Russia	≥90 (Note: This figure is from the corresponding linked article.)
5	Thane	India	79
6	Shenzhen	China	≥73
7	Baghdad	Iraq	≥42
8	Dubai	United Arab Emirates	≥38
9	Guangzhou	China	≥32
10	Wuhan	China	≥30
11	Xi'an	China	31
12	Singapore	Singapore	27
13	Tokyo	Japan	29
14	Navi Mumbai	India	27
15	Chengdu	China	20
16	Hangzhou	China	20
17	Toronto	Canada	20
18	Changsha	China	17
19	Zhuhai	China	16
20	Balneário Camboriú	Brazil	14
21	Miami	United States	13
22	Suzhou	China	13
23	Shanghai	China	12
24	Shenyang	China	12
25	Sydney	Australia	11
26	New York City	United States	11
27	Dongguan	China	10
28	Jinan	China	10

== Cities with the most skyscrapers by height ==
The ranking of cities with the most skyscrapers depends on the height used for the definition of a skyscraper. The following table lists the number of skyscrapers in a city that stands above 150 meters (492 ft), 200 meters (656 ft), and 300 meters (984 ft), as of January 2026. When using a definition of 200 meters (656 ft), Shenzhen is the city with the most skyscrapers, followed by Dubai, Hong Kong, and New York City. Dubai is the city with the most supertall skyscrapers, followed by Shenzhen and New York City.

Rank	City	Country/region	≥150 m (492 ft)	≥200 m (656 ft)	≥300 m (984 ft)	≥400 m (1,312 ft)
1	Hong Kong	Hong Kong	569	102	6	2
2	Shenzhen	China	471	200	22	2
3	New York City	United States	324	102	18	6
4	Dubai	United Arab Emirates	289	134	34	3
5	Mumbai	India	247	87	2	0
6	Metro Manila	Philippines	215	15	1	0
7	Guangzhou	China	212	69	14	2
8	Wuhan	China	209	76	8	2
9	Shanghai	China	205	76	9	3
10	Bangkok	Thailand	204	43	3	0
11	Kuala Lumpur	Malaysia	201	74	7	4
12	Tokyo	Japan	200	42	1	0
13	Chongqing	China	156	64	6	0
14	Chicago	United States	137	38	7	2
15	Chengdu	China	136	50	0	0
16	Jakarta	Indonesia	117	51	2	0
17	Toronto	Canada	106	31	0	0
18	Shenyang	China	101	30	3	0
19	Hangzhou	China	100	38	2	0
20	Moscow	Russia	100	25	6	0
21	Singapore	Singapore	100	34	0	0
22	Nanning	China	94	37	6	1
23	Changsha	China	92	50	6	1
24	Seoul	South Korea	86	21	2	1
25	Nanjing	China	82	39	8	1
26	Melbourne	Australia	79	29	1	0
27	Tianjin	China	79	36	3	1
28	Busan	South Korea	77	25	4	1
29	Beijing	China	70	27	2	1
30	Miami	United States	69	9	0	0
31	Panama City	Panama	68	25	0	0
32	Hyderabad	India	65	5	0	0
33	Zhuhai	China	62	23	3	0
34	Dalian	China	59	30	2	0
35	Doha	Qatar	57	30	3	0
36	Istanbul	Turkey	57	12	1	0
37	Suzhou	China	54	28	3	1
38	Sydney	Australia	53	17	0	0
39	Incheon	South Korea	50	8	1	0
40	Hefei	China	49	27	0	0
41	Jinan	China	46	17	3	0
42	Osaka	Japan	46	5	1	0
43	Abu Dhabi	United Arab Emirates	45	23	4	0
44	Foshan	China	43	17	0	0
45	London	United Kingdom	43	12	1	0
46	Nanchang	China	41	24	2	0
47	Xiamen	China	41	19	1	0
48	Houston	United States	40	16	2	0
49	Qingdao	China	40	17	1	0
50	Guiyang	China	39	29	3	1
51	Taipei	Taiwan	39	8	1	1
52	Penang	Malaysia	38	3	0	0
53	Johor Bahru	Malaysia	35	5	0	0
54	Kunming	China	35	20	3	0
55	Macau	Macau	33	2	0	0
56	Balneário Camboriú	Brazil	32	6	0	0
57	Thane	India	32	0	0	0
58	Los Angeles	United States	32	13	2	0
59	Ningbo	China	32	8	1	1
60	Xi'an	China	32	16	1	0
61	Mexico City	Mexico	30	8	0	0
62	Riyadh	Saudi Arabia	30	15	4	0
63	Wuxi	China	30	15	4	0

== See also ==
- List of countries with the most skyscrapers
- List of cities in Australia with the most skyscrapers
- List of cities in the United States with the most skyscrapers
- List of tallest buildings
- List of tallest buildings by city
