= Guangxi China Resources Tower =

Supertall skyscraper in Nanning, Guangxi, China

- 广西华润大厦
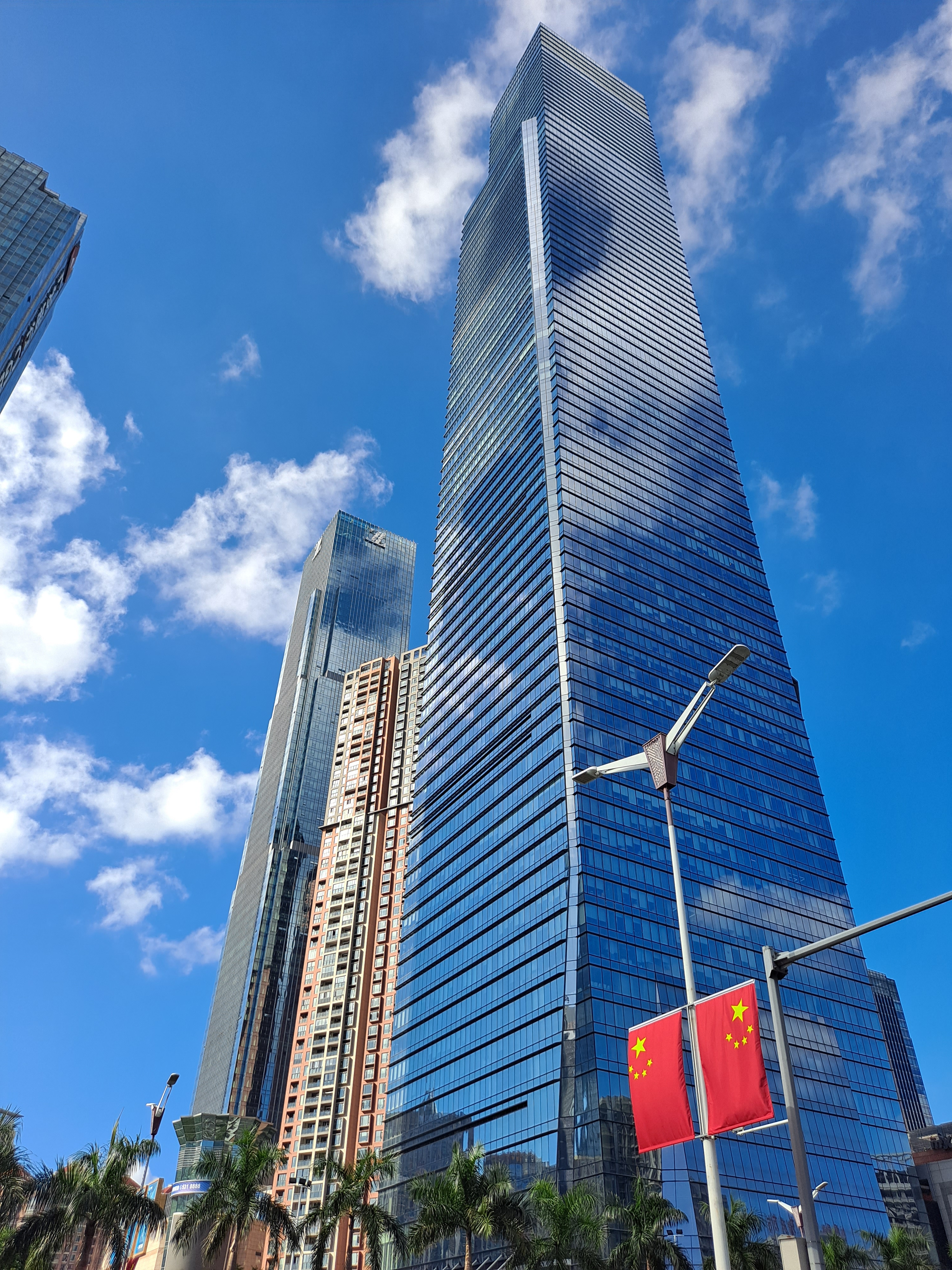
- Interactive map of the Guangxi China Resources Tower area
- Alternative names: China Resources Centre Block A, China Resources Centre Phase 3

General information
- Status: Completed
- Type: Hotel / Office
- Location: Nanning, Guangxi, China
- Construction started: 21 October 2014
- Completed: 2020
- Opened: 2 November 2020
- Owner: China Resources (Holdings) Company Limited

Height
- Architectural: 402.7 metres (1,321.2 ft)
- Top floor: 374.3 metres (1,228 ft)

Technical details
- Floor count: 87
- Floor area: 272,255 m^{2} (2,930,530 sq ft)
- Lifts/elevators: 59

Design and construction
- Architect: Goettsch Partners

Other information
- Number of rooms: 336
- Parking: 500 spaces

Guangxi China Resources Tower or China Resources Centre Block A is a supertall skyscraper in Nanning, Guangxi, China. It rises 403 metres (1,322.2 ft) tall. Construction started in 2014 and opened on November 2, 2020. It was originally planned to be 445 m (1,460 ft) but was cancelled mid construction due to airspace restrictions.

== See also ==
- List of tallest buildings in China
