= Logan Century Center 1 =

Supertall skyscraper in Nanning, Guangxi, China

- Interactive map of the Logan Century Center 1 area

General information
- Status: Completed
- Location: Nanning, Guangxi, China
- Coordinates: 22°48′42.2″N 108°23′41.2″E
- Groundbreaking: 2011
- Construction started: May 15, 2013
- Completed: November 13, 2018

Height
- Architectural: 382 metres (1,253.3 ft)
- Tip: 390 metres (1,279.5 ft)
- Top floor: 365 metres (1,197.5 ft)

Technical details
- Floor count: 82 above and 4 below ground
- Lifts/elevators: 32

Logan Century Center 1 is a 382-metre (1,253.3 ft)-tall supertall skyscraper in Nanning, China. Construction started in 2013 and was completed in 2018.

== See also ==
- List of tallest buildings in China
