= Guangxi Finance Plaza =

Supertall skyscraper in Nanning, Guangxi, China

- Interactive map of the Guangxi Finance Plaza area

General information
- Status: Completed
- Location: Nanning, Guangxi, National Road, China
- Construction started: 2010
- Completed: 2016

Height
- Architectural: 321 m (1,053 ft)
- Tip: 321 m (1,053 ft)
- Roof: 320.5 m (1,052 ft)
- Top floor: 294.6 m (967 ft)

Technical details
- Floor count: 68 (+4 underground)
- Floor area: 219,000 m^{2} (2,360,000 sq ft)

Other information
- Parking: 1,892

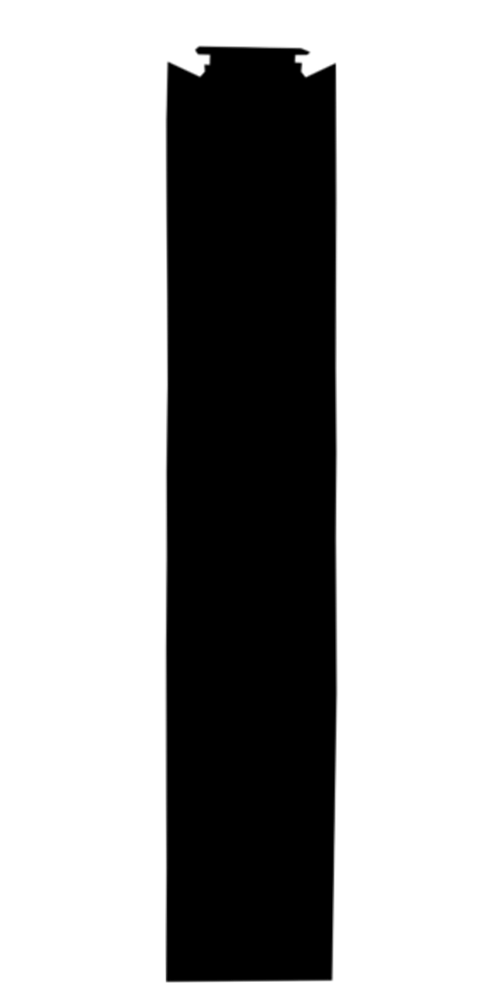
Guangxi Finance Plaza

Guangxi Finance Plaza is a supertall skyscraper in Nanning, Guangxi, China. It has a height of 321 metres (1,053 ft). Construction began in 2010 and was completed in 2016.

== See also ==
- List of tallest buildings in China
