= Diwang International Commerce Center =

Skyscraper in Nanning, Guangxi, China

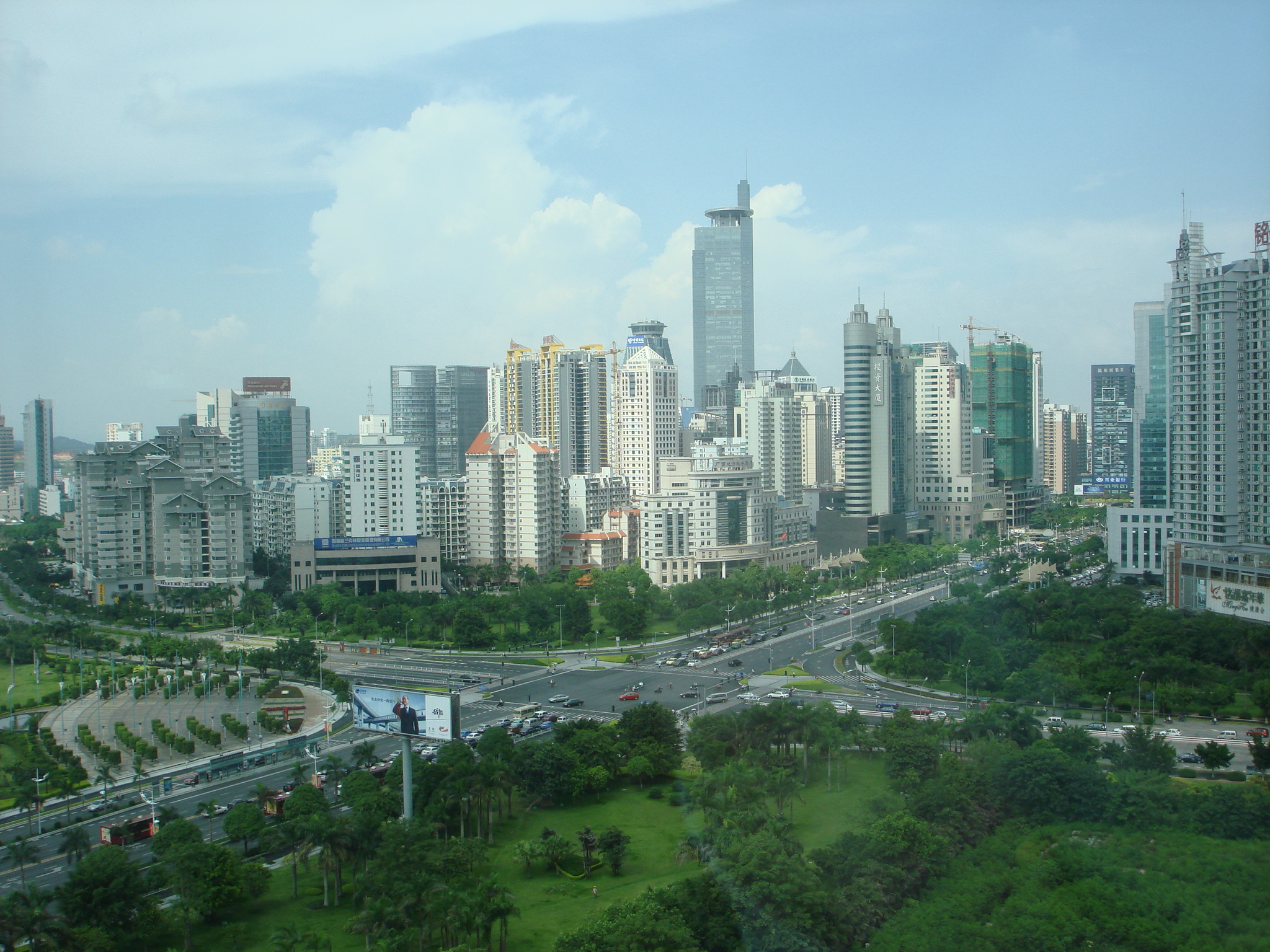
- Diwang International Commerce Center is the eighth-tallest building in Nanning.
- Interactive map of the Diwang International Commerce Center area

General information
- Location: Nanning, China
- Coordinates: 22°49′05″N 108°21′56″E
- Completed: 2006

Height
- Antenna spire: 276 m (906 ft)

Technical details
- Floor count: 54

Diwang International Commerce Center (simplified Chinese: 地王国际商会中心; traditional Chinese: 地王國際商會中心; pinyin: Dìwáng Guójì Shānghuì Zhōngxīn) is a 54-floor, 276-meter (906-foot) tall skyscraper completed in 2006, located in Nanning, China.

== See also ==
- List of tallest buildings in the world
- List of tallest buildings in China
