= List of tallest buildings in Iraq =

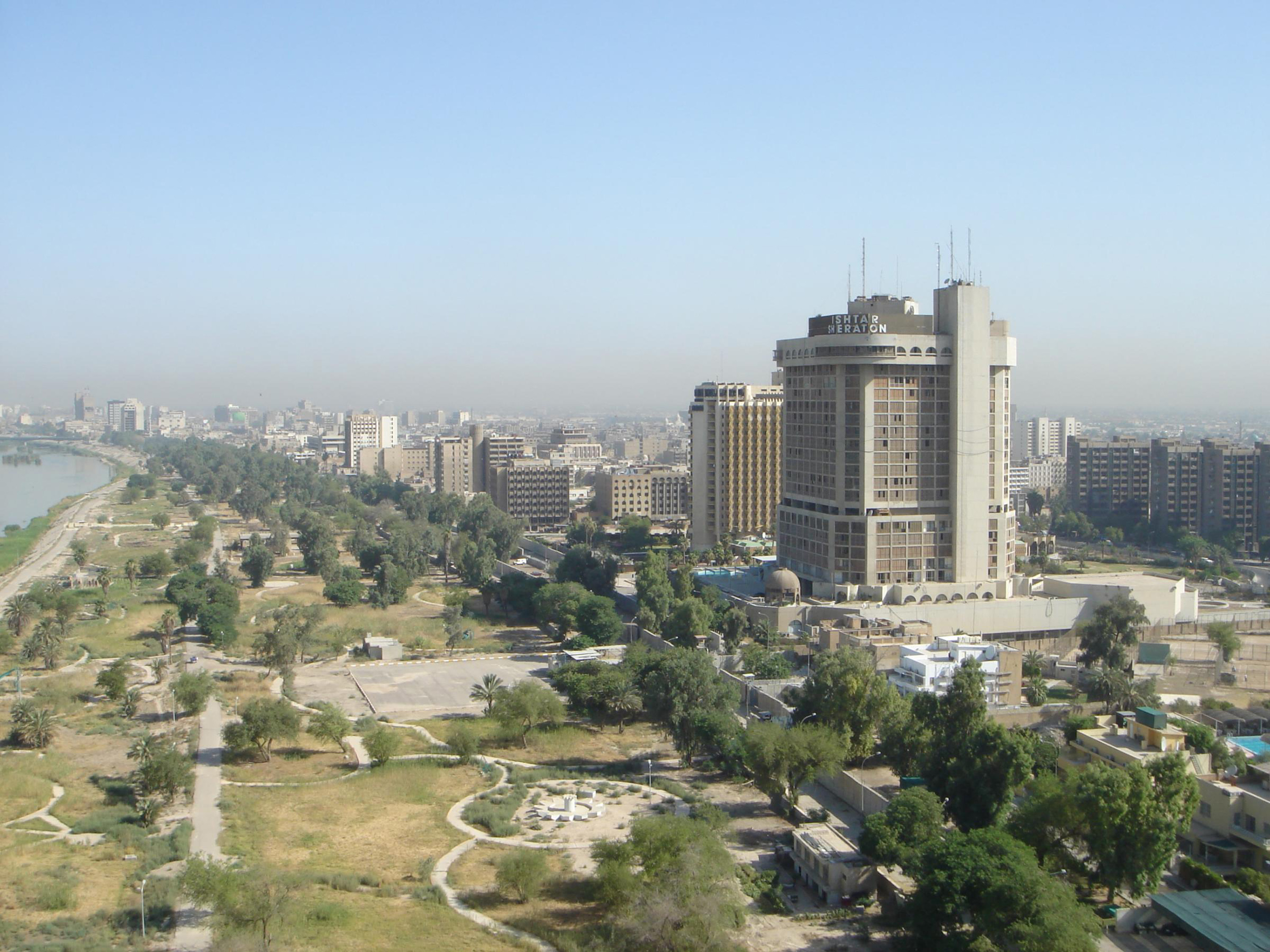
The skyline of Baghdad

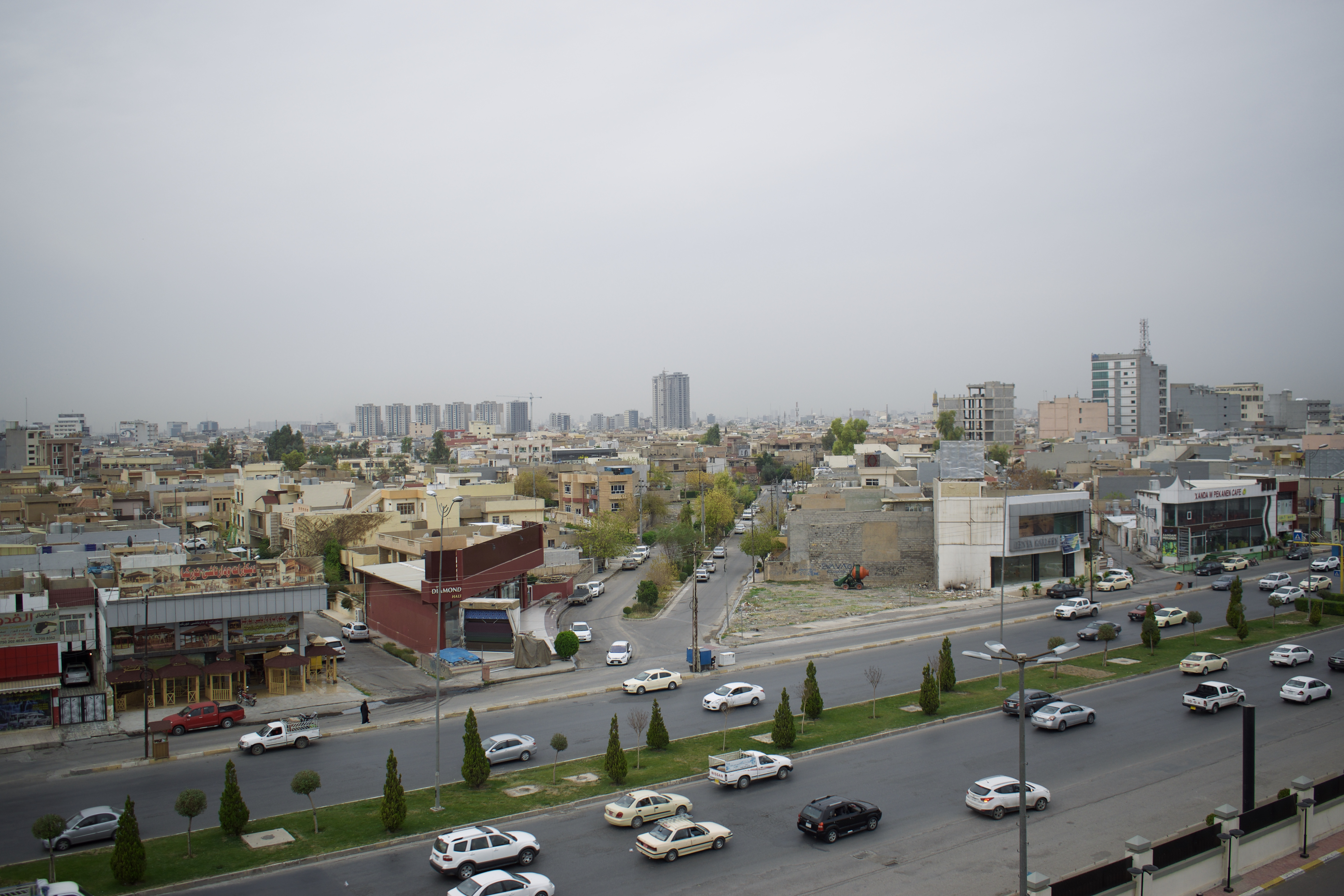
The skyline of Erbil, as viewed from the Cristal Hotel

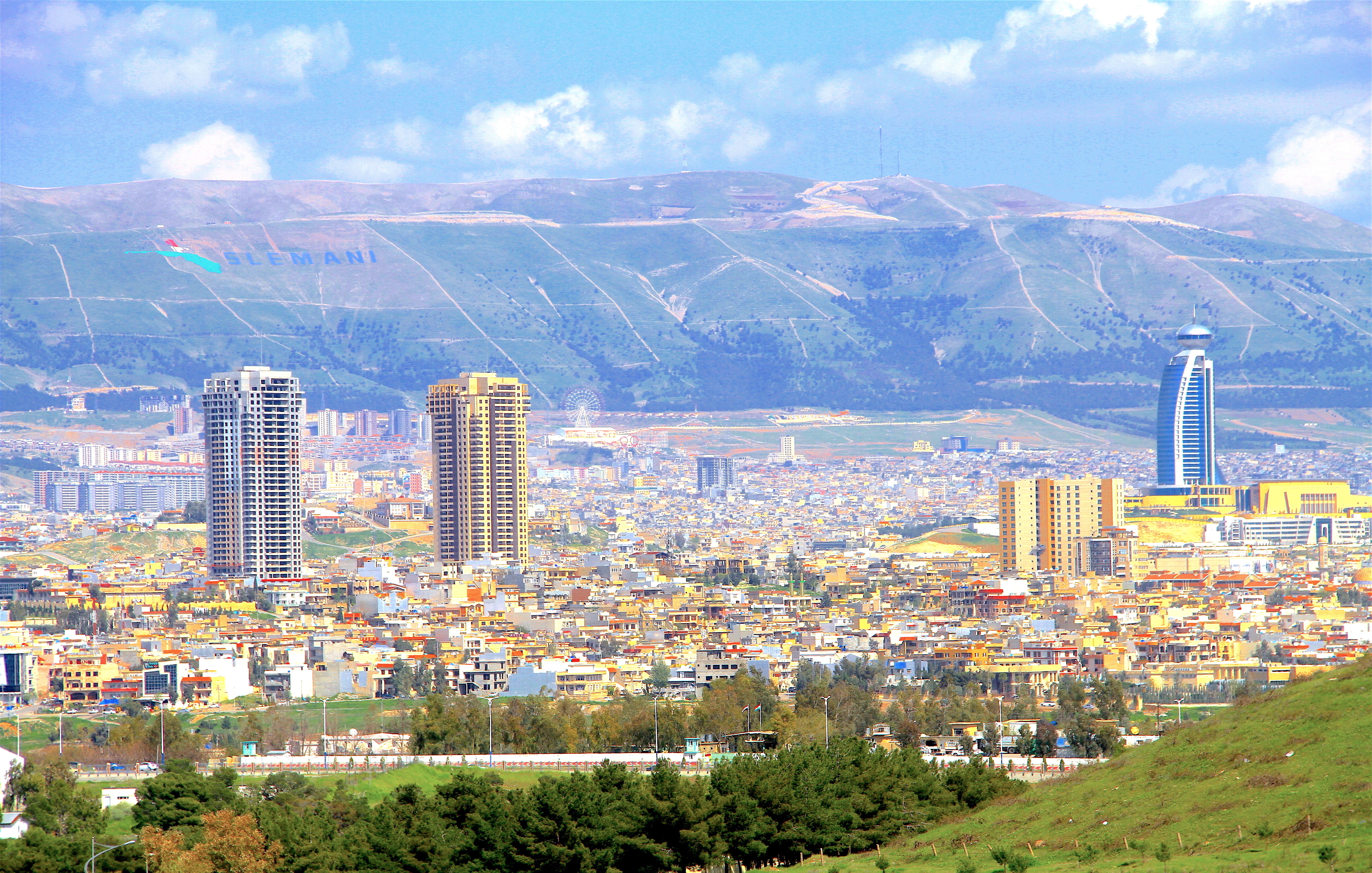
The skyline of Sulaymaniyah

This list of the tallest buildings in Iraq ranks skyscrapers and high-rises in Iraq by height. As of 2026, Iraq has a relatively small number of skyscrapers compared to neighboring countries, a situation largely shaped by decades of conflict, economic instability, and delays in large-scale urban development. Currently, only eight buildings in the country exceed 150 m (490 ft) in height, most of which are located in Erbil and primarily serve mixed-use, residential, or hotel functions. In recent years, renewed investment and post-conflict reconstruction efforts have resulted in several high-rise projects being proposed or entering construction, signaling a gradual shift toward vertical development in Iraq’s major urban centers.

== Tallest buildings ==
Was the tallest building in Iraq upon completion
Indicates buildings that have been topped out but not yet completed

This list ranks completed and topped-out skyscrapers and high-rises in Iraq that stand at least 300 ft (91 m) tall, based on standard height measurement. This includes spires and architectural details, but does not include antenna masts. The "Year" column indicates the year in which a building was completed.

| Rank | Name | Image | Height m (ft) | Floors | Year | City | Notes |
|---|---|---|---|---|---|---|---|
| 1 | E1 Tower | | 180 m (590 ft) | 48 | 2023 | Erbil | The tallest building in Iraq. Formerly known as Zaniary Tower. |
| 2 | Central Bank of Iraq Tower | | 171.9 m (564 ft) | 37 | 2026 | Baghdad | The tallest office building in Iraq. Designed by Zaha Hadid. |
| 3= | Jaff Tower A | | 155 m (509 ft) | 32 | 2013 | Sulaymaniyah | The co-tallest residential building in Iraq. Tallest building in Iraq from 2013 to 2023. |
| 3= | Jaff Tower B | | 155 m (509 ft) | 32 | 2014 | Sulaymaniyah | The co-tallest residential building in Iraq. Tallest building in Iraq from 2013 to 2023. |
| 4= | London Tower A | | 153 m (502 ft) | 51 | 2026 | Erbil | |
| 4= | London Tower B | | 153 m (502 ft) | 51 | 2026 | Erbil | |
| 4= | London Tower C | | 153 m (502 ft) | 51 | 2026 | Erbil | |
| 5 | Grand Millennium Hotel | | 150 m (490 ft) | 39 | 2013 | Sulaymaniyah | Tallest hotel in Iraq. |
| 6 | Cavalli Tower | | 149 m (489 ft) | 50 | 2025 | Erbil | |
| 7= | Tulip Tower 1 | | 145 m (476 ft) | 44 | 2026 | Erbil | |
| 7= | Tulip Tower 2 | | 145 m (476 ft) | 44 | 2026 | Erbil | |
| 7= | Tulip Tower 3 | | 145 m (476 ft) | 44 | 2026 | Erbil | |
| 7= | Tulip Tower 4 | | 145 m (476 ft) | 44 | 2026 | Erbil | |
| 8= | Downtown Baghdad Tower A | | 132 m (433 ft) | 35 | 2026 | Baghdad | |
| 8= | Downtown Baghdad Tower B | | 132 m (433 ft) | 35 | 2026 | Baghdad | |
| 8= | Downtown Baghdad Tower E | | 132 m (433 ft) | 35 | 2026 | Baghdad | |
| 8= | Downtown Baghdad Tower F | | 132 m (433 ft) | 35 | 2026 | Baghdad | |
| 9= | Justice Tower | | 130 m (430 ft) | 40 | 2016 | Erbil | |
| 9= | Empire Business Tower | | 130 m (430 ft) | 33 | 2011 | Erbil | Tallest building in Iraq from 2011 to 2013. |
| 10 | Rayhaan Rotana | | 120 m (390 ft) | 32 | 2017 | Baghdad | |
| 11 | Quattro Towers | | 116 m (381 ft) | 29 | 2017 | Erbil | |
| 12 | Ishtar Hotel | | 99 m (325 ft) | 21 | 1982 | Baghdad | Formerly known as Ishtar Sheraton Hotel & Casino. Seriously damaged during a bomb attack on October 2005. Tallest building in Iraq from 1982 to 2011. |

== Under construction ==
This section lists skyscrapers and high-rises in Iraq that are under construction and are expected to rise over 300 ft (91 m) in height. As of 2026, Baghdad’s skyline is growing rapidly, with five supertall skyscrapers and more than 45 skyscrapers planned to reach at least 328 ft (100 m), along with numerous additional proposals.

| Name | Height | Floors | Estimated Completion | City | Notes |
|---|---|---|---|---|---|
| First Iraq Tower | 380 m (1,250 ft) | 80 | 2028 | Baghdad | |
| Amwaj Twin Towers | 330 m (1,080 ft) | 70 | 2028 | Baghdad | |
| Amwaj Twin Towers II | 280 m (920 ft) | 60 | 2028 | Baghdad | |
| Rashid Gate Tower | 260 m (850 ft) | 70 | 2028 | Baghdad | |
| Dijlah Dreams Tower 1 | 240 m (790 ft) | 60 | TBA | Baghdad | |
| Dijlah Dreams Tower 2 | 240 m (790 ft) | 60 | TBA | Baghdad | |
| Dijlah Dreams Tower 3 | 240 m (790 ft) | 60 | TBA | Baghdad | |
| Landmark Gateway 1 | 240 m (790 ft) | 60 | TBA | Baghdad | |
| Landmark Gateway 2 | 240 m (790 ft) | 60 | TBA | Baghdad | |
| Bismayah Hotel Skyscraper | 240 m (790 ft) | 60 | TBA | Baghdad | |
| Al-Asreeyah Tower 1 | 230 m (750 ft) | 52 | TBA | Baghdad | |
| Al-Asreeyah Tower 2 | 230 m (750 ft) | 52 | TBA | Baghdad | |
| Fakher Towers 1 | 220 m (720 ft) | 53 | 2027 | Baghdad | |
| Nawas Tower | 210 m (690 ft) | 50 | TBA | Baghdad | |
| Dragh Tower 1 | 210 m (690 ft) | 47 | TBA | Baghdad | |
| Dragh Tower 2 | 210 m (690 ft) | 47 | TBA | Baghdad | |
| Dragh Tower 3 | 210 m (690 ft) | 47 | TBA | Baghdad | |
| Dragh Tower 4 | 210 m (690 ft) | 47 | TBA | Baghdad | |
| Fakher Towers 2 | 200 m (660 ft) | 50 | TBA | Baghdad | |
| Heritage Towers | 186 m (610 ft) | 48 | TBA | Baghdad | |
| Fakher Towers 3 | 180 m (590 ft) | 43 | TBA | Baghdad | |
| Kurd Tower 1 | 175 m (574 ft) | 33 | TBA | Sulaymaniyah | |
| Kurd Tower 2 | 175 m (574 ft) | 33 | TBA | Sulaymaniyah | |
| Baghdad Grand Palace Hotel | 170 m (560 ft) | 40 | 2028 | Baghdad | |
| Heritage Towers 2 | 160 m (520 ft) | 40 | TBA | Baghdad | |
| Zayouna Tower 1 | 160 m (520 ft) | 41 | TBA | Baghdad | |
| Zayouna Tower 2 | 160 m (520 ft) | 41 | TBA | Baghdad | |
| Zayouna Tower 3 | 160 m (520 ft) | 41 | TBA | Baghdad | |
| Zayouna Tower 4 | 160 m (520 ft) | 41 | TBA | Baghdad | |
| Zayouna Tower 5 | 160 m (520 ft) | 41 | TBA | Baghdad | |
| Burj Rawan | 160 m (520 ft) | 50 | TBA | Baghdad | |
| Al Firdous Mall Tower | 158 m (518 ft) | 15 | TBA | Karbala | |
| Golden Towers 1 | 155 m (509 ft) | 45 | TBA | Baghdad | |
| Golden Towers 2 | 155 m (509 ft) | 45 | TBA | Baghdad | |
| Golden Towers 3 | 155 m (509 ft) | 45 | TBA | Baghdad | |
| Golden Towers 4 | 155 m (509 ft) | 45 | TBA | Baghdad | |
| Canali Towers 1 | 150 m (490 ft) | 44 | TBA | Baghdad | |
| Canali Towers 2 | 150 m (490 ft) | 44 | TBA | Baghdad | |
| Canali Towers 3 | 150 m (490 ft) | 44 | TBA | Baghdad | |
| Canali Towers 4 | 150 m (490 ft) | 44 | TBA | Baghdad | |
| Canali Towers 5 | 150 m (490 ft) | 44 | TBA | Baghdad | |
| Kadhmiya Waterfront Tower | 150 m (490 ft) | 50 | TBA | Baghdad | |
| Swas Tower | 150 m (490 ft) | 50 | TBA | Mosul | |
| Baghdad View Commercial Tower | 150 m (490 ft) | 40 | TBA | Baghdad | |
| Ishtar Gate Towers 1 | 150 m (490 ft) | TBA | TBA | Baghdad | |
| Ishtar Gate Towers 2 | 150 m (490 ft) | TBA | TBA | Baghdad | |
| Downtown Baghdad Tower C | 132 m (433 ft) | 35 | 2027 | Baghdad | |
| Downtown Baghdad Tower D | 132 m (433 ft) | 35 | 2027 | Baghdad | |
| Downtown Baghdad Tower G | 132 m (433 ft) | 35 | 2026 | Baghdad | |
| Downtown Baghdad Tower H | 132 m (433 ft) | 35 | 2027 | Baghdad | |
| Al Firdous Towers | 130 m (430 ft) | 36 | TBA | Karbala | |
| Swiss Commercial Tower | 112 m (367 ft) | 26 | TBA | Baghdad | |
| Silk Tower 1 | 110 m (360 ft) | 33 | TBA | Baghdad | |
| Silk Tower 2 | 110 m (360 ft) | 33 | TBA | Baghdad | |
| Silk Tower 3 | 110 m (360 ft) | 33 | TBA | Baghdad | |
| Silk Tower 4 | 110 m (360 ft) | 33 | TBA | Baghdad | |
| Silk Tower 5 | 110 m (360 ft) | 33 | TBA | Baghdad | |
| Silk Tower 6 | 110 m (360 ft) | 33 | TBA | Baghdad | |
| Silk Tower 7 | 110 m (360 ft) | 33 | TBA | Baghdad | |
| Diamond Tower 1 | 104 m (341 ft) | 29 | TBA | Baghdad | |
| Diamond Tower 2 | 104 m (341 ft) | 29 | TBA | Baghdad | |
| Emerald Tower | 102 m (335 ft) | 25 | TBA | Baghdad | |
| Wishes Towers | 101 m (331 ft) | 25 | TBA | Karbala | |
| Sky Office Tower | 100 m (330 ft) | 24 | TBA | Baghdad | |

== On hold ==
This list ranks skyscrapers and high-rises in Iraq that are currently on hold and were planned to exceed 300 ft (91 m) in height.

| Name | Height m (ft) | Floors | Estimated Completion | City | Notes |
|---|---|---|---|---|---|
| Naza Tower | 275 m (902 ft) | 65 | TBD | Erbil | Indefinitely on hold since 2018. |
| Marriott Hotel | 122 m (400 ft) | 28 | TBD | Erbil | |

== Proposed ==
This list ranks proposed skyscrapers and high-rises in Iraq that are planned to exceed 300 ft (91 m) in height.

| Name | Height m (ft) | Floors | Estimated Completion | City | Notes |
|---|---|---|---|---|---|
| The Bride | 1,152 m (3,780 ft) | 241 | TBD | Basra | If built, it would become the world's tallest building and structure. Despite the project being presented, there are currently no signs of construction. |
| Max Tower | 470 m (1,542 ft) | TBD | TBD | Erbil | |
| Erbil Tower | 190 m (623 ft) | TBD | TBD | Erbil | |
| Future City Tower 1 | 138 m (453 ft) | 46 | TBD | Erbil | |
| Future City Tower 2 | 138 m (453 ft) | 46 | TBD | Erbil | |

== See also ==
- List of tallest structures in the Middle East
- List of tallest buildings in Iran
