= Zhonghua =

Zhōnghuá, Chung¹-hua² or Chunghwa (simplified Chinese: 中华; traditional Chinese: 中華) is a term that indicates a relation to, or descent from, China or its culture, and derives from the historical concept of Huaxia. It is used in the following terms:

== People's Republic of China ==
- Zhōnghuá Rénmín Gònghéguó, the Chinese name for the People's Republic of China
- Zhonghua (car), cars produced by Brilliance China Auto
- Chunghwa (cigarette), premium brand of cigarettes
- Chung Hwa Pencil, a famous pencil brand owned by Lao Feng Xiang
- Chung-hwa, toothpaste brand owned by Unilever

=== Subdistricts ===
- Zhonghua Subdistrict, Xiamen, in Siming District, Xiamen, Fujian

== Republic of China ==
- Zhōnghuá Mínguó or Chunghwa Minkuo, the Republic of China in Chinese
- Chunghwa Telecom
- Chunghwa Post, the official postal service of Taiwan
- Chung Hua University, a private university in Xiangshan District, Hsinchu City, Taiwan
- Chung-Hua Institution for Economic Research, a Taiwan-based international policy think tank
- Chunghwa Postal Museum, a museum located in Zhongzheng District, Taipei, Taiwan
- Chinese Taipei, the formal name used by Taiwan for diplomatic purposes, standardised in Taiwanese Mandarin as "Chunghwa Taipei".
- Zhōnghuá Hángkōng, China Airlines in Chinese

== Other uses ==
- Huaxia, a name representing the Chinese civilisation
- Zhonghua minzu, literally the Chinese nation
- Little China (ideology), or "Xiao Zhonghua", conception of the political and cultural realm of China in the Sinosphere
- A school in Singapore. See primary schools in Singapore.
- Chong Hua Hospital, a hospital in Cebu City, Philippines
- Zamboanga Chong Hua High School, a school in Zamboanga City, Philippines
- Davao Chong Hua High School, a school in Davao City, Philippines
- Lanao Chung Hua School, a school in Iligan City, Philippines
- China Motor Bus, a real estate developer and former public bus service operator in Hong Kong
- CLP Power, a multinational power company based in Kowloon, Hong Kong
- Hong Kong and China Gas, supplier of towngas in Hong Kong and numerous other markets

== See also ==
- Sinocentrism
- Sinosphere
- Chunghwasan
- China (disambiguation)
- Kaisyuan Jhonghua light rail station, Kaohsiung Metro, Taiwan
