= List of tallest buildings in Xiamen =

Tall buildings in Xiamen
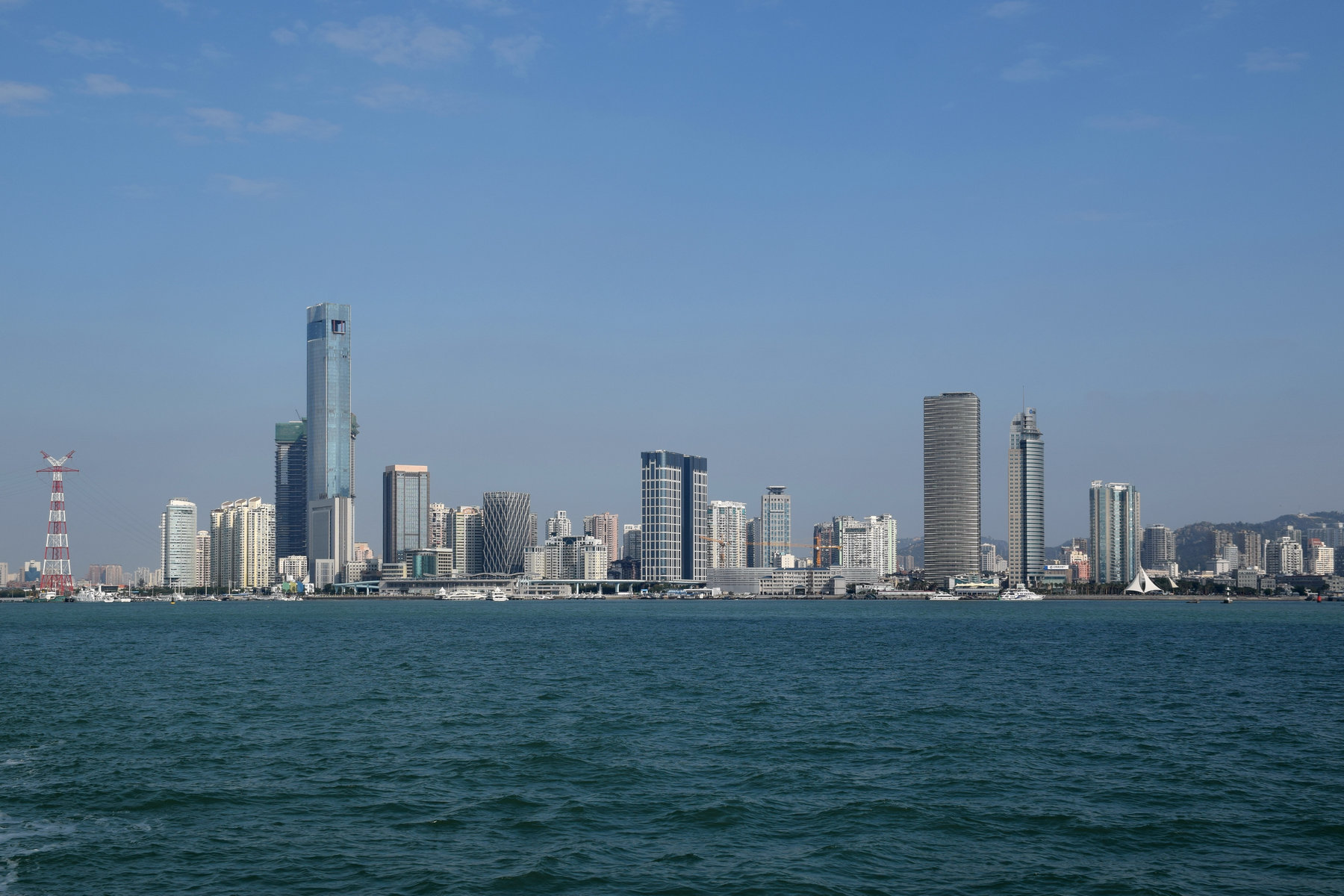
- Skyline of Siming District in Xiamen in 2018, with the Xiamen International Center to the left
- Tallest building: Xiamen International Centre (2025)
- Tallest building height: 343.9 metres (1,128 ft)
- First 150 m+ building: International Trade Building (1995)

Number of tall buildings
- Taller than 150 m (492 ft): 38 (2025)
- Taller than 200 m (656 ft): 16 (2025)

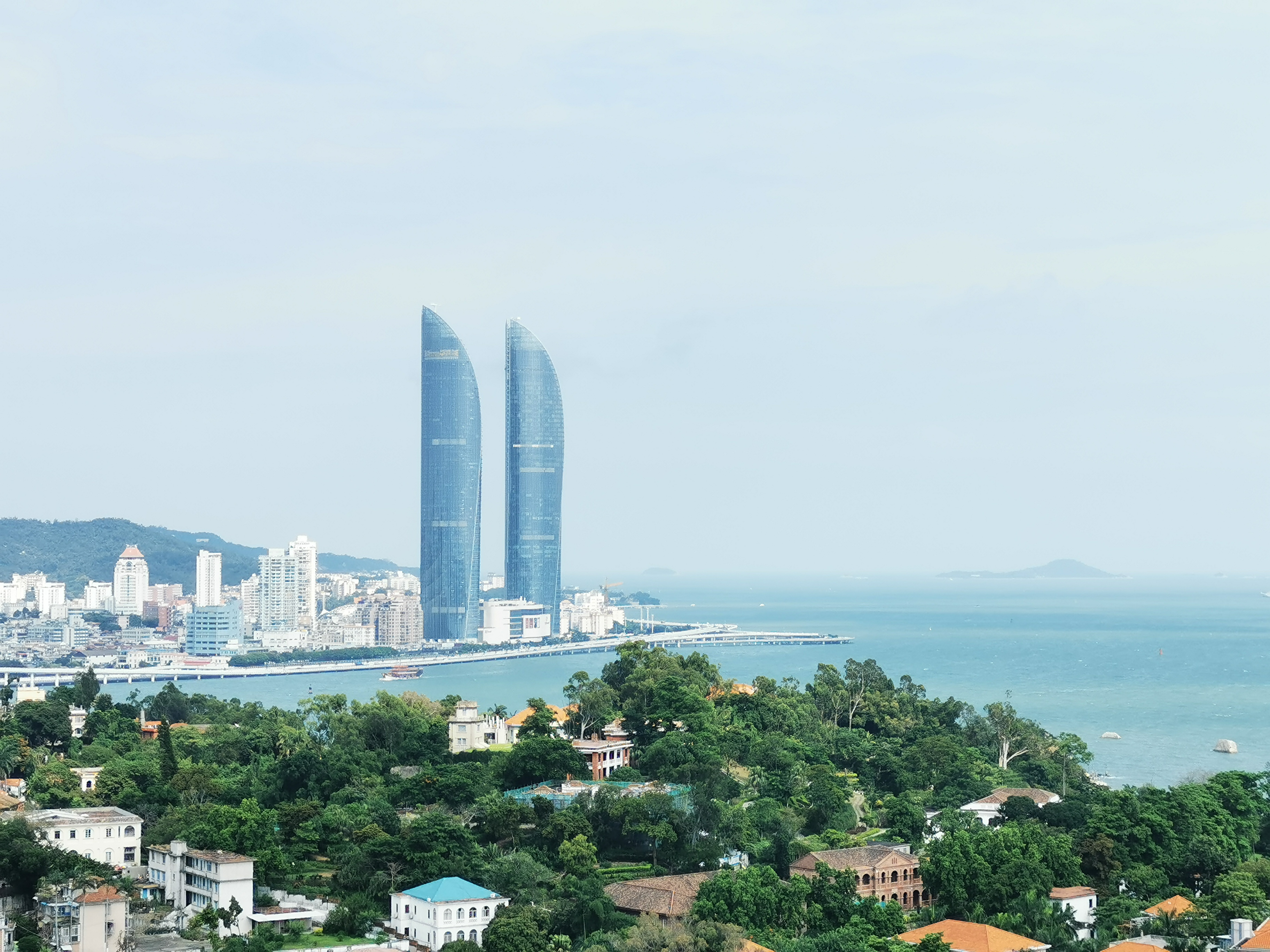
Skyline of Siming District and Gulangyu in Xiamen with Xiamen Shimao Strait Tower

This list of tallest buildings in Xiamen ranks skyscrapers in the southeastern coastal city of Xiamen, China, by height. Xiamen is a sub-provincial city under Fujian province, and is one of the largest cities in Fujian. The urbanized area of the city, which includes districts in neighbouring Zhangzhou, forms a built-up area of over 7.2 million people.

Xiamen became one of China's earliest Special Economic Zones (SEZs) in the 1980s, although its skyline has not grown as much as other early SEZs such as Shenzhen. The construction of tall buildings increased significantly during the early 2010s and has since stayed mostly constant.

As of 2025, Xiamen has 38 skyscrapers that reach a height of 150 m (492 ft), more than the provincial capital, Fuzhou. 16 of these are over 200 m (656 ft) in height. Fuzhou has no completed supertall skyscrapers, buildings that reach over 300 m (984 ft) in height;. The planned supertall building Xiamen International Center, which topped out in 2016, remains unfinished and was sold by the original developer in 2020. Now renamed the Xiamen Cross Strait Financial Centre, it is expected to finish construction in 2025 at a height of 343.9 m (1,128 ft), overtaking Tower B of Shimao Cross-Strait Plaza as the city's tallest building.

== Tallest buildings ==
This list ranks completed skyscrapers in Xiamen that are at least 200 metres (656 ft) tall, based on standard height measurement. This includes spires and architectural details but does not include antenna masts.

| Rank | Building | Image | Height | Floors | Use | Year | Notes |
|---|---|---|---|---|---|---|---|
| 1 | Xiamen Shimao Straits Tower B | | 295.3 m | 67 | Office | 2015 | |
| 2 | Xinglin Bay Business Tower | | 261.9 m | 54 | Office | 2016 | |
| 3 | Dijing Park Tower 1 | | 258 m | 62 | Residential | 2019 | |
| 4 | Dijing Park Tower 2 | | 258 m | 62 | Residential | 2019 | |
| 5 | Dijing Park Tower 3 | | 258 m | 62 | Residential | 2019 | |
| 6 | Xiamen Shimao Straits Tower A | | 249.9 m | 59 | Mixed-use | 2015 | |
| 7 | Bangzhou Park Tower | | 248 m | 49 | Office | 2022 | |
| 8 | Xiamen Strait Pearl Plaza | | 235.8 m | 50 | Office | 2019 | |
| 9 | C&D International Tower | | 219.4 m | 49 | Office | 2013 | |
| 10 | Lucheng Plaza Tower 1 | | 217 m | 53 | Residential | 2018 | |
| 11 | Portman Fortune Center Tower A | | 213.8 m | 48 | Office | 2014 | |
| 12 | Portman Fortune Center Tower B | | 213.8 m | 48 | Office | 2014 | |
| 13 | Xiamen Financial Centre | | 212.7 m | 49 | Office | 2013 | |
| 14 | AVIC Plaza | | 202 m | 48 | Office | 2015 | |
| 15 | Zijin Mining Plaza | | 202 m | 48 | Office | 2015 | |
| 16 | Wyatt Hotel | | 202 m | 41 | Hotel | 2024 | |

== Tallest under construction or proposed ==
=== Under construction ===
This lists buildings that are under construction in Xiamen and are planned to rise at least 200 metres (656 ft).

| Rank | Building | Height | Floors | Use | Year | Notes |
|---|---|---|---|---|---|---|
| 1 | Xiamen Cross Strait Financial Centre | 343.9 m | 68 | Office | 2025 | |
| 2 | CCCC Egret West Tower | 266 m | 47 | Office / Hotel | 2025 | |
| 3 | Xiamen International Centre Hotel Tower | 216.1 m | 50 | Hotel | 2025 | |
| 4 | Jinyuan Investment Group Headquarters | 215.7 m | 45 | Office | 2025 | |
| 5 | Xiamen International Bank Headquarters | 210 m | 45 | Office | 2025 | |

== Timeline of tallest buildings ==
This lists buildings that once held the title of tallest building in Xiamen.

| Name | Chinese name | Chinese Address | Years as tallest | Height m/ft | Floors | Reference |
|---|---|---|---|---|---|---|
| Hall of Guanyin, South Putuo Temple | 南普陀寺大悲殿 | 思明南路515號 | 1684–1859 | 18 metres (59 ft) | 3 | Religious |
| Church of Our Lady of the Rosary | 玫瑰聖母堂 | 磁安路15號 | 1859–1925 | 20 metres (66 ft) | 3 | Religious |
| Running-Water Company Building | 自來水公司大樓 | 鷺江道水仙路口 | 1925–1927 | 25 metres (82 ft) | 5 | Office |
| Police, Fire and Clock Tower | 警察消防鐘樓 | 公園西路出米巖 | 1927–1932 | 30 metres (98 ft) | 6 | Office |
| New World Casino | 新世界娛樂城 | 廈禾路與故宮路交匯處 | 1932–1959 | 30 metres (98 ft) | 7 | Commercial |
| Nanxun Lou | 南薰樓 | 鰲園路27號 | 1959–1986 | 54 metres (177 ft) | 15 | Educational |
| Zhenye Plaza | 振業大廈 | 湖濱北路108號 | 1986–1988 | 68.9 metres (226 ft) | 18 | Office |
| Haibin Plaza | 海濱大廈 | 鷺江道52號 | 1988–1994 | 95.6 metres (314 ft) | 24 | Office |
| Xiangjiang Garden | 香江花園 | 嘉禾路104號 | 1994–1995 | 118.8 metres (390 ft) | 36 | Residential |
| Minnan Plaza | 閩南大廈 | 湖濱一裏26號 | 1995 | 151.2 metres (496 ft)(Pinnacle 161.2 metres (529 ft)) | 39 | Office, hotel |
| ITG Plaza | 廈門國貿大廈 | 湖濱南路388號 | 1995–2003 | 168 metres (551 ft) | 45 | Office |
| CCB Plaza | 建設銀行大廈 (廈門) | 鷺江道98號 | 2003–2011 | 176.68 metres (580 ft)(Pinnacle 197 metres (646 ft)) | 43 | Office |
| Kempinski Hotel Xiamen | 源昌凱賓斯基大酒店 | 湖濱中路98號 | 2011 | 185.2 metres (608 ft)(Pinnacle 197.9 metres (649 ft)) | 47 | Office, hotel |
| Xiamen Fortune Center | 廈門財富中心 | 鷺江道100號 | 2011–2013 | 192.45 metres (631 ft) | 43 | Office |
| Xiamen International Financial Center | 廈門國際金融中心 | 展鴻路82號 | 2013 | 212.65 metres (698 ft) | 49 | Office |
| C&D International Plaza | 建發國際大廈 | 環島東路1699號 | 2013–2015 | 219.85 metres (721 ft) | 49 | Office |
| Shimao Cross-Strait Plaza | 廈門世茂海峽大廈 | 大學路177號 | 2015–2025 | 295.3 metres (969 ft) | 64 | SOHO |
| Shimao Cross-Strait Plaza | 廈門世茂海峽大廈 | 大學路177號 | 2015–2025 | 295.3 metres (969 ft) | 55 | Office, hotel |
| Xiamen International Centre | 廈門綠發中心 | 鷺江道501號 | 2025– | 343.9 metres (1,128 ft) | 68 | Office |
