= List of tallest buildings in China by city =

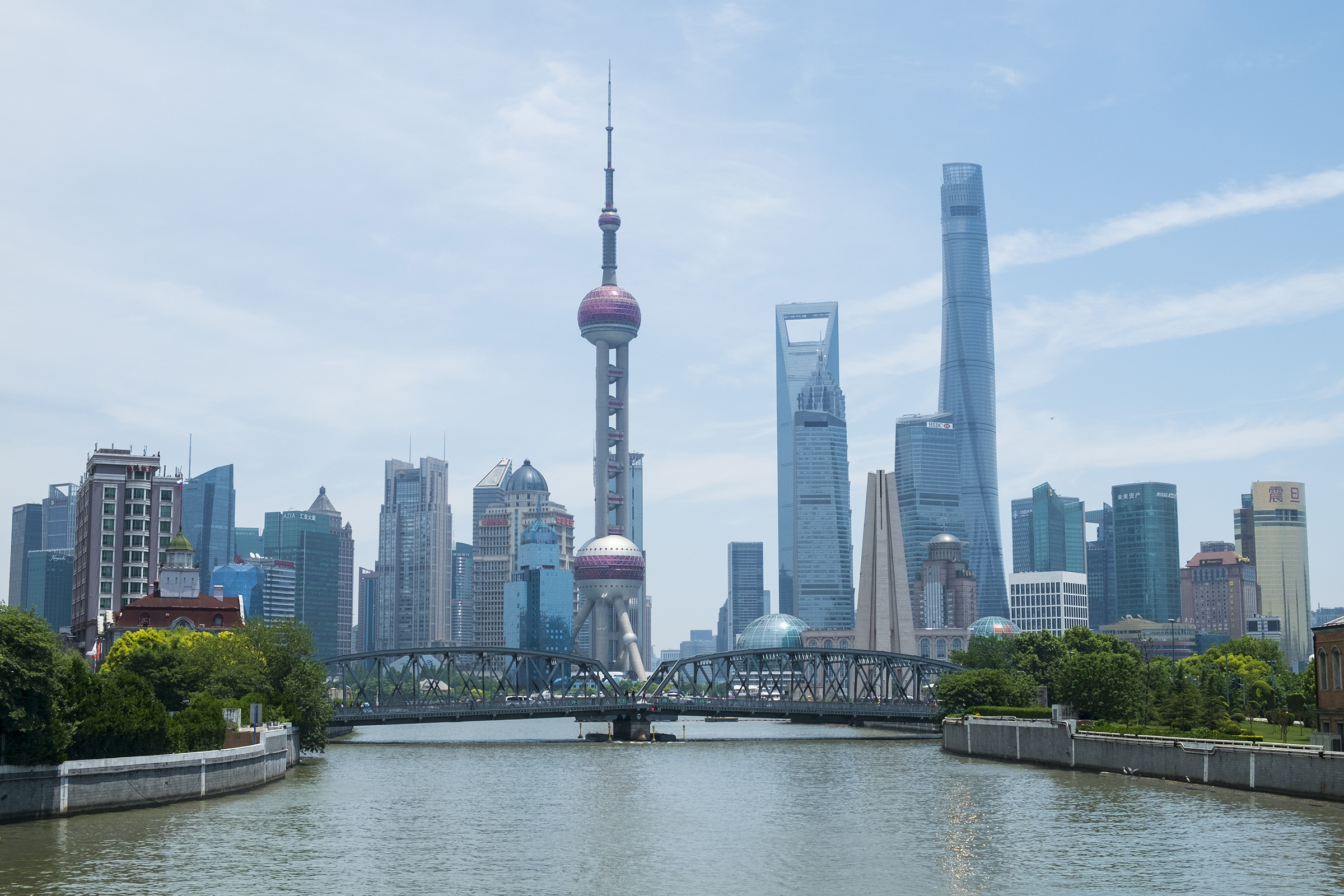
Shanghai skyline

This following lists the tallest buildings in China by city, including the Special Administrative Regions of Hong Kong and Macau, and excluding Taiwan. A total of 32 cities featured in this list currently have at least one supertall skyscraper. The current tallest building in China is the Shanghai Tower in Shanghai, which rises 632 metres (2,073 ft) and was completed in 2015.

== Current ==
This list includes the tallest (completed or topped out) buildings in China by city. All measurements are as defined and recognised by the Council on Tall Buildings and Urban Habitat (CTBUH). Heights are measured to architectural top, with antennae being excluded. Only buildings over 300 metres (980 ft) are included.

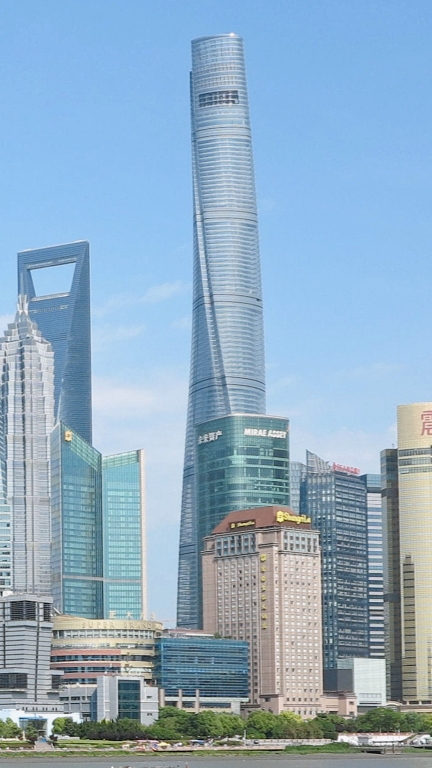
Shanghai Tower in Shanghai, currently the tallest building in China

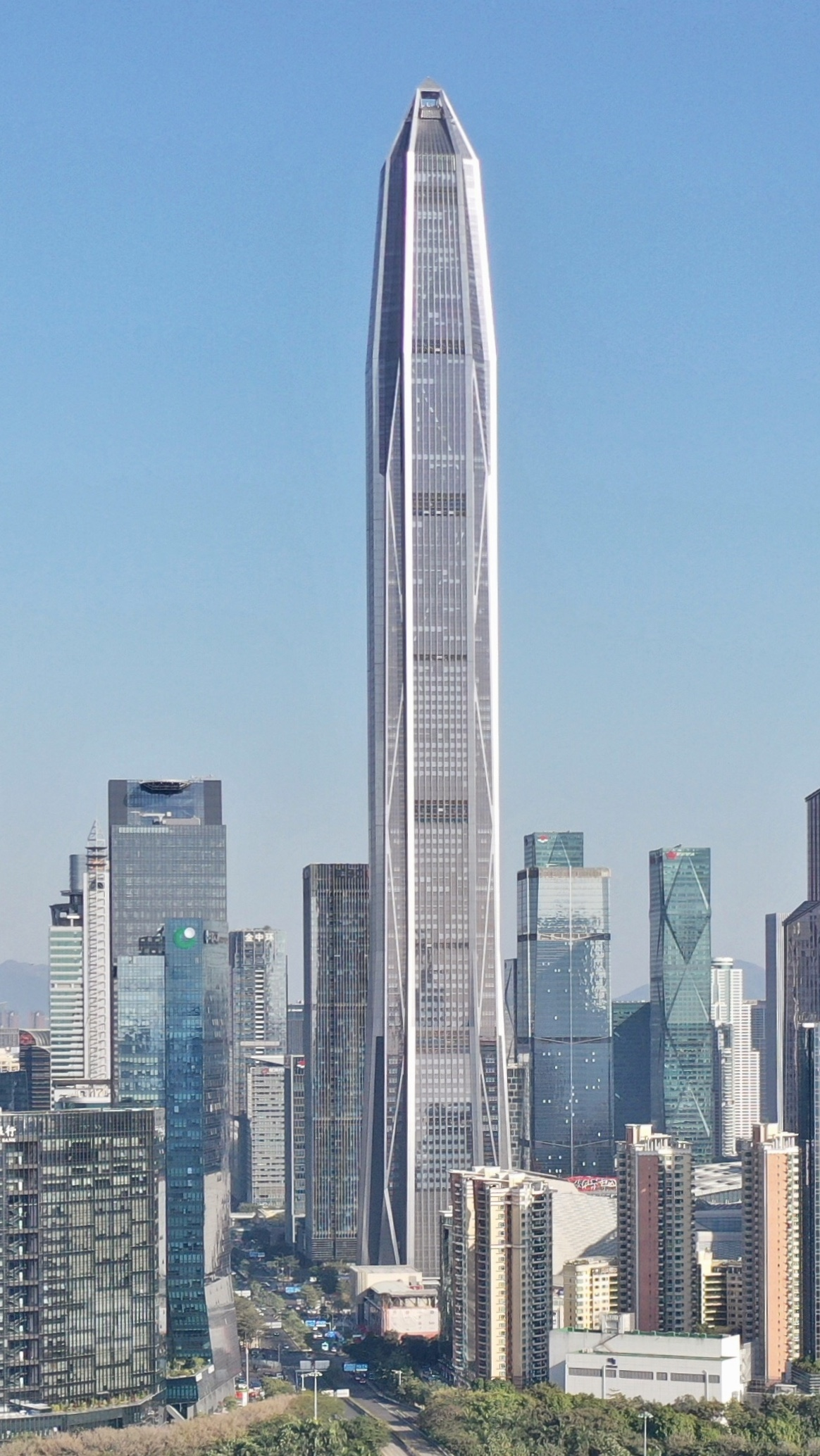
Ping An Finance Center in Shenzhen

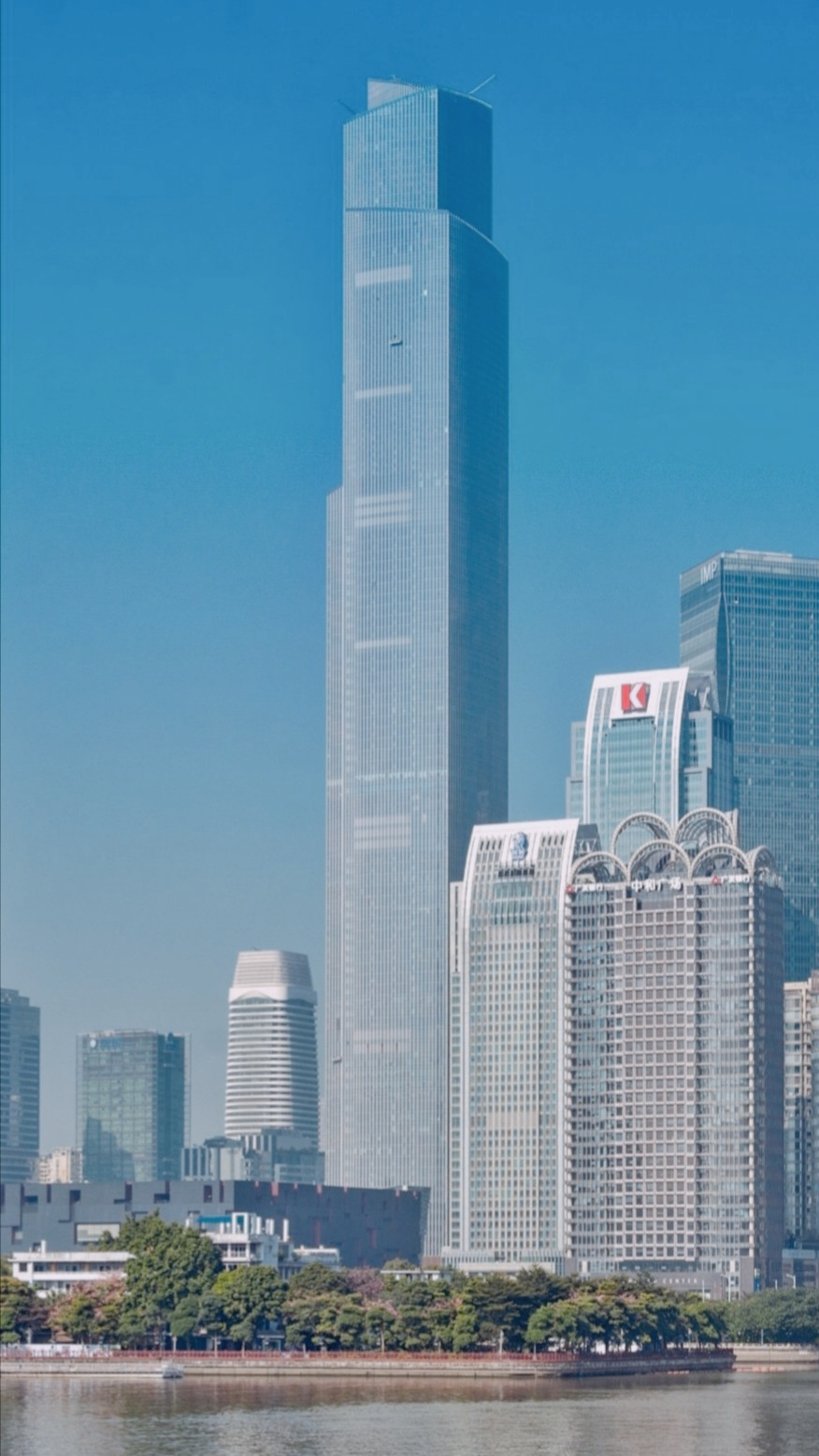
Guangzhou CTF Finance Center in Guangzhou

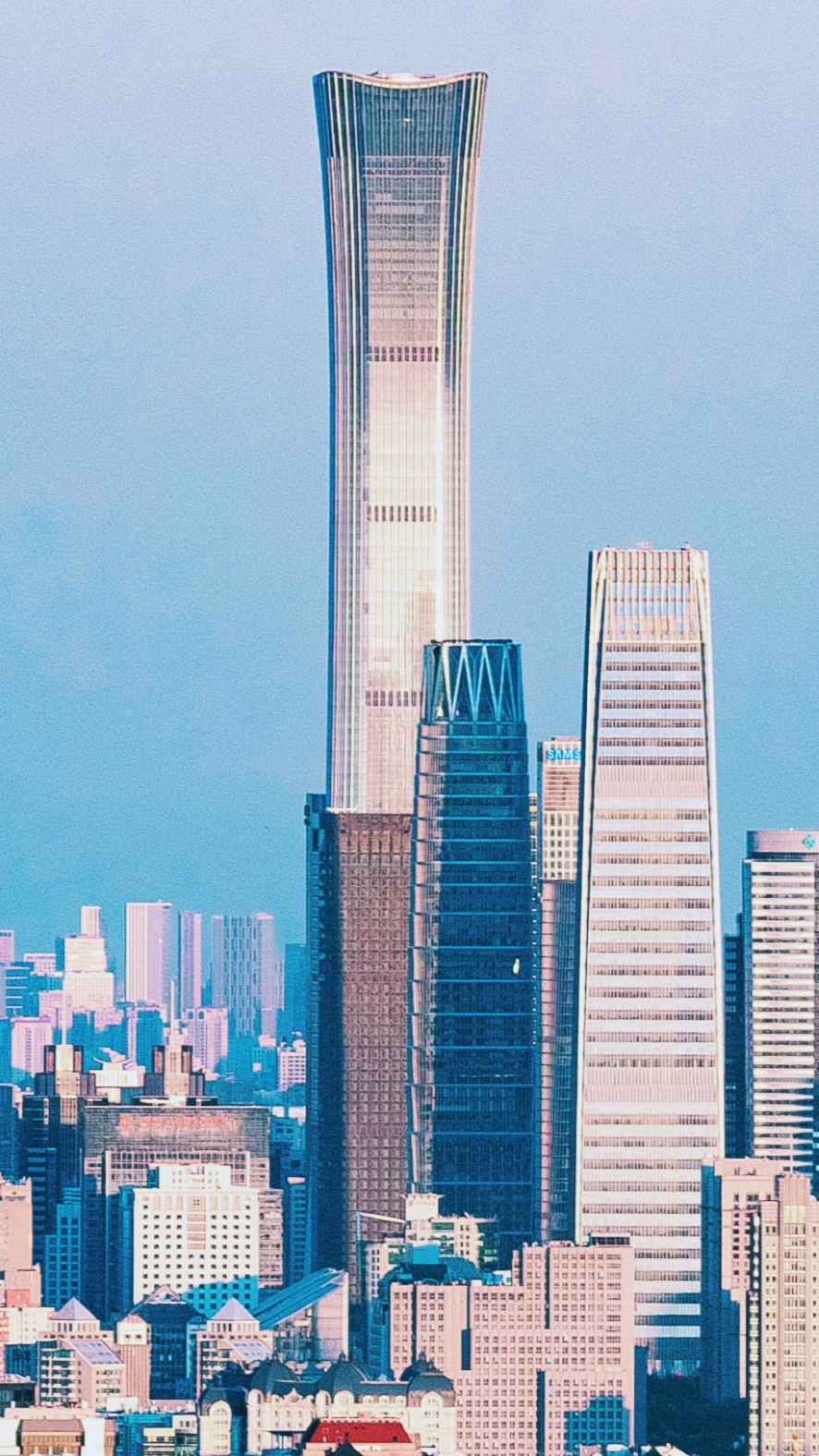
China Zun in Beijing

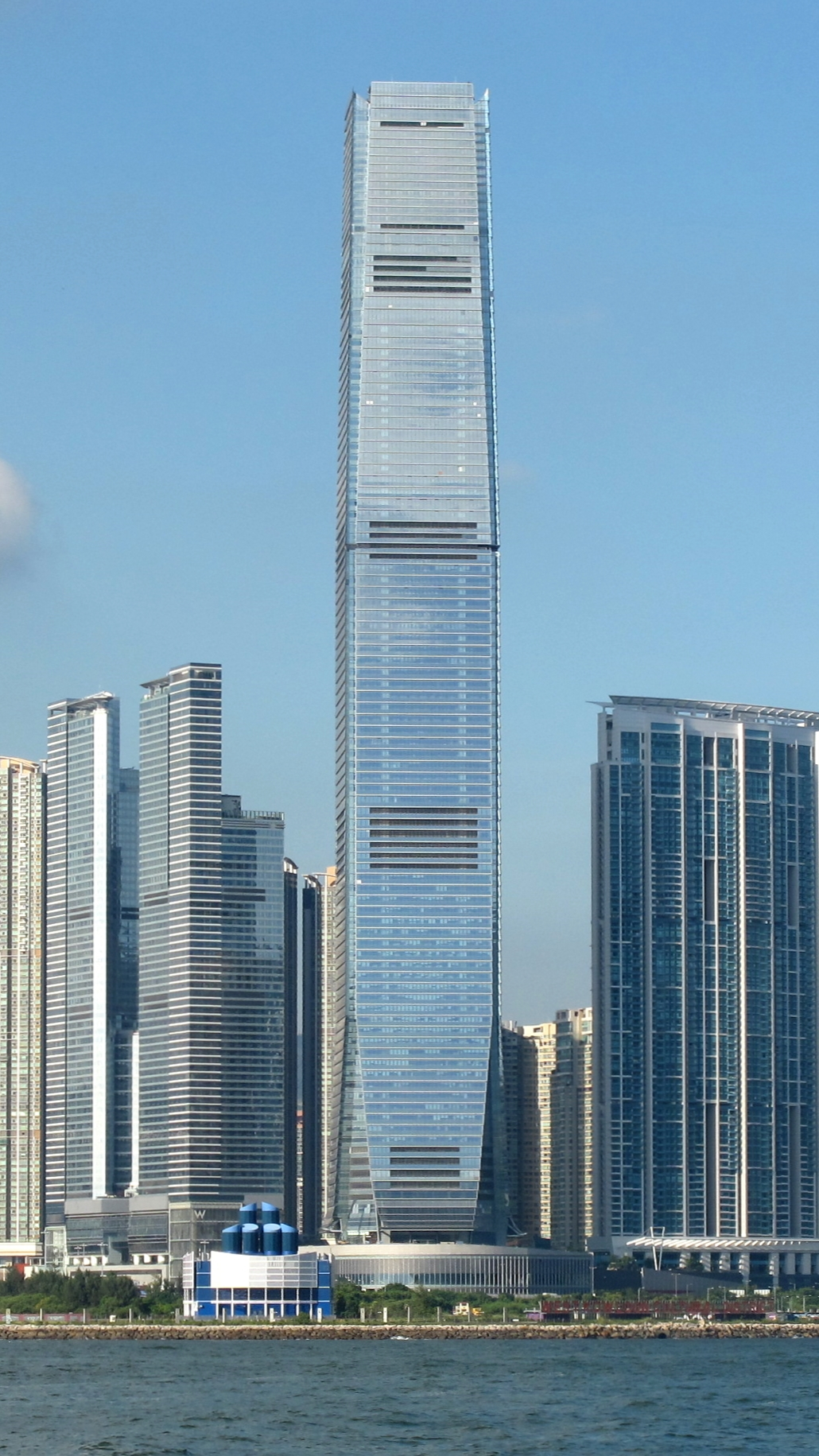
International Commerce Centre in Hong Kong

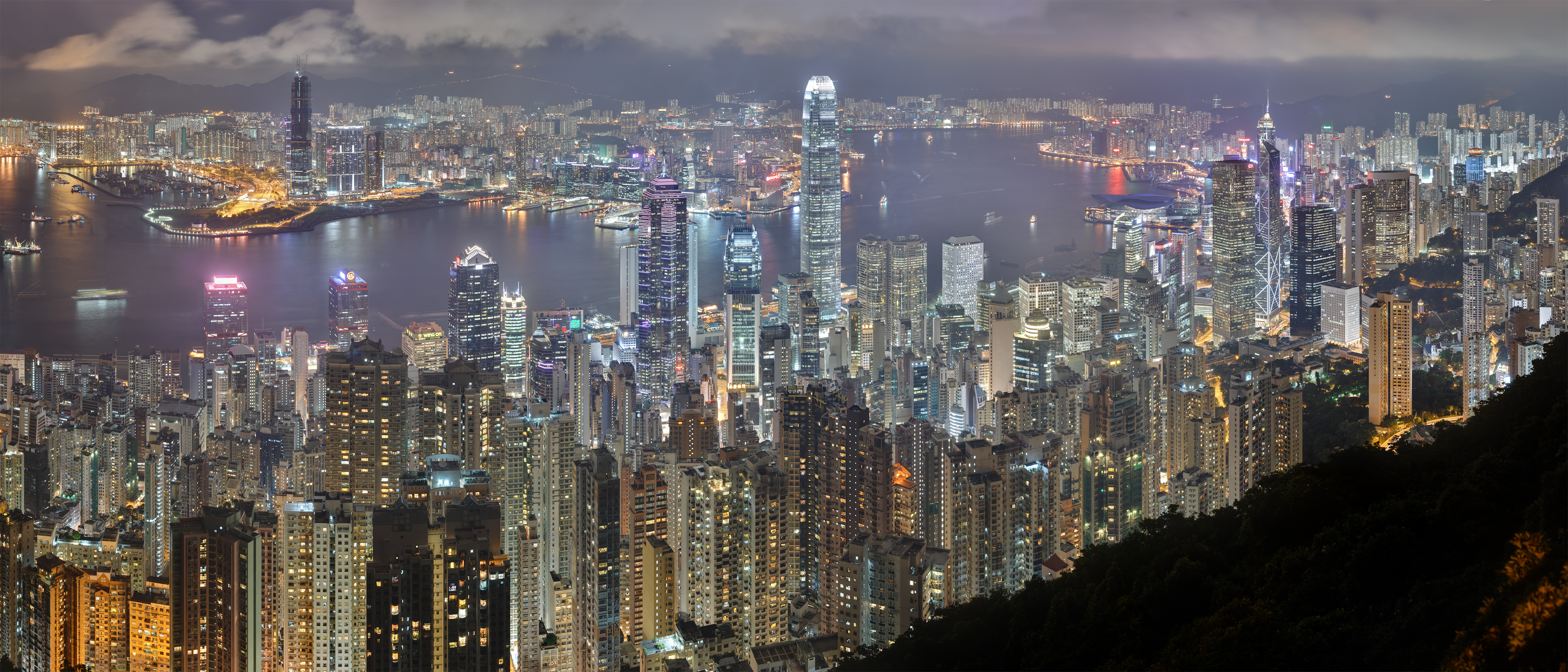
Hong Kong is home to the most completed skyscrapers in China

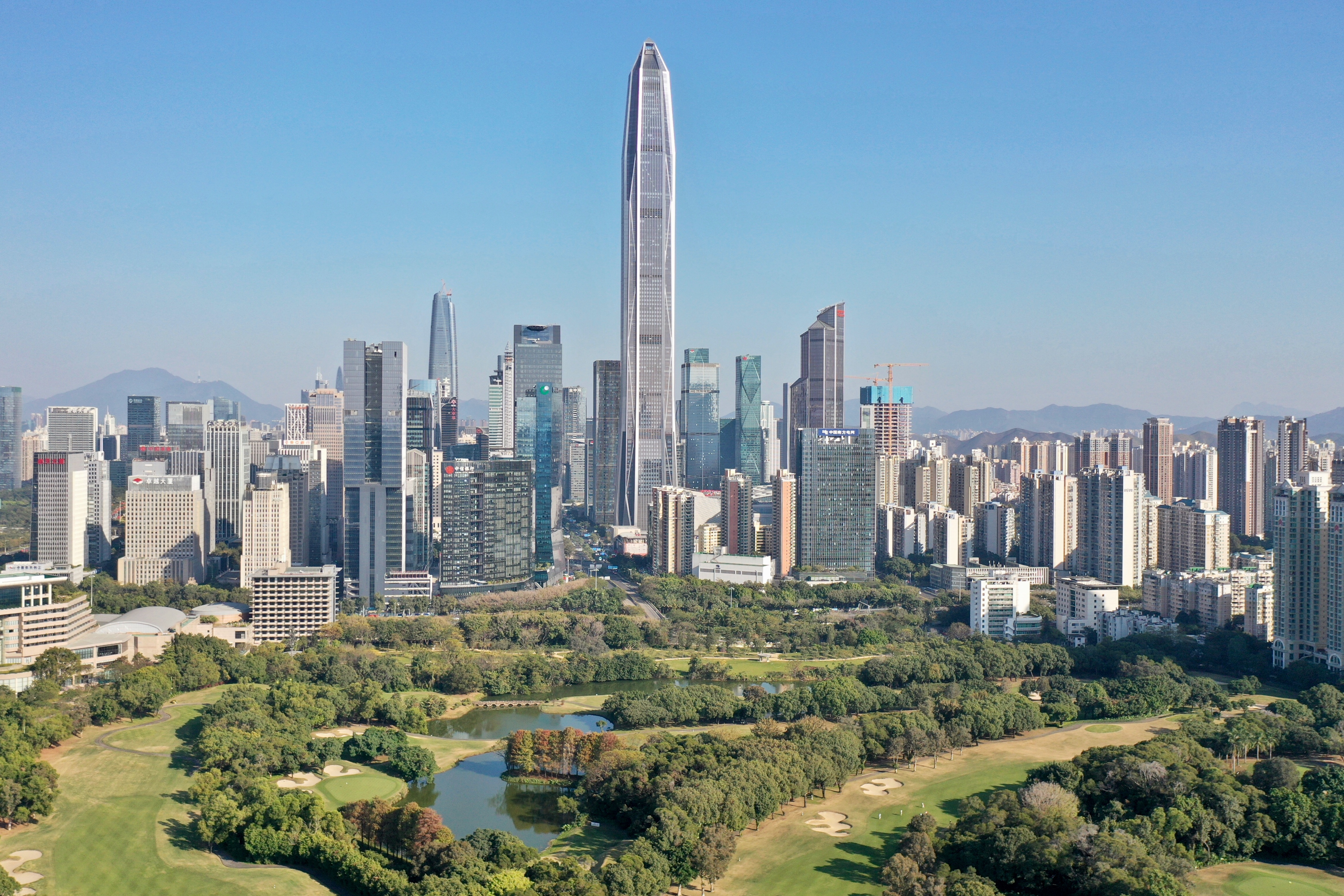
Shenzhen is home to the most completed supertall skyscrapers in China

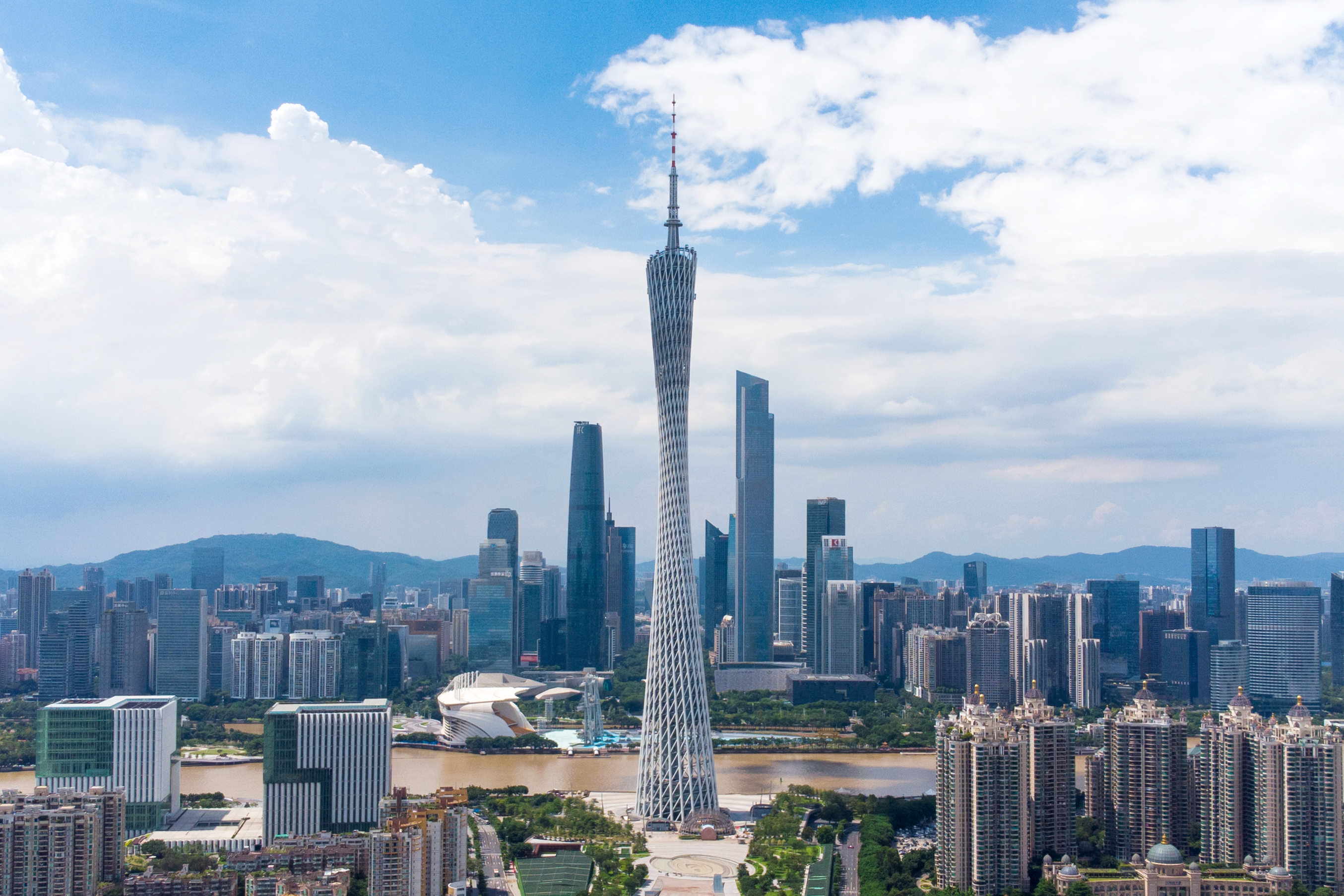
Guangzhou is home to the 2nd most completed supertall skyscrapers in China

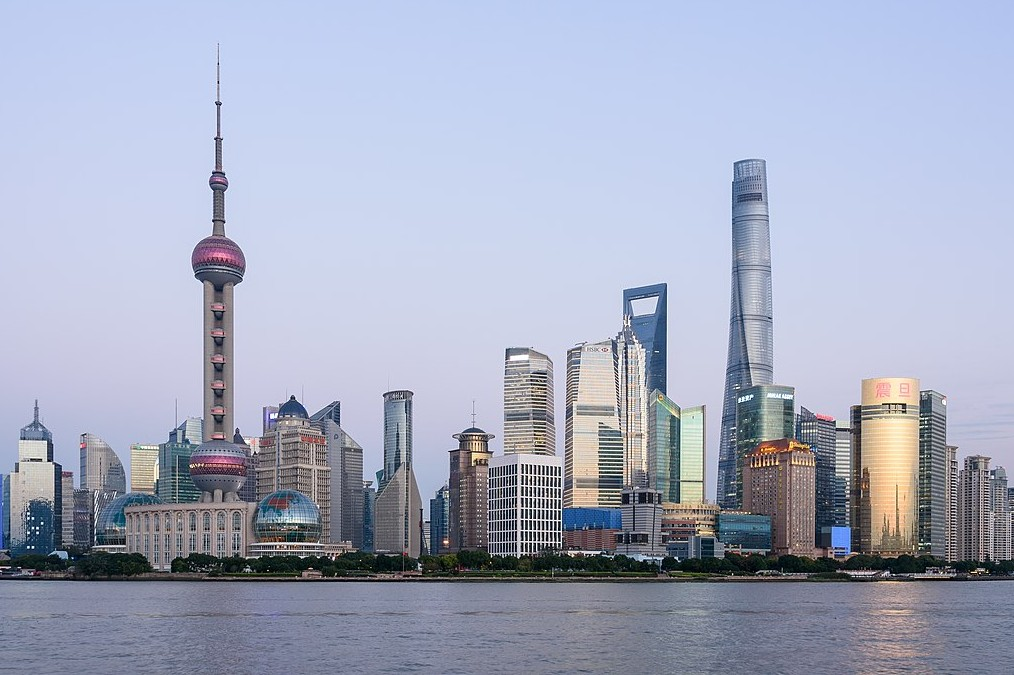
Shanghai is home to the only completed megatall skyscrapers in China

City	Building	Height (m)	Height (ft)	Floors	Built	Rank in China
Beijing	China Zun	528 m	1732 ft	109	2018	5
Changsha	Changsha IFS Tower T1	452 m	1483 ft	94	2018	10
Chongqing	International Land-Sea Center	458 m	1,535 ft	98	2024	
Dalian	Eton Place Dalian Tower 1	383 m	1257 ft	80	2016	26
Dongguan	Dongguan International Trade Center 1	423 m	1,386 ft	85	2021	16
Fuzhou	ICC Thang Long Global Center	300 m	984 ft	57	2019	114
Guangzhou	Guangzhou CTF Finance Centre	530 m	1739 ft	111	2016	3
Guiyang	Guiyang International Financial Center	401 m	1316 ft	79	2020	20
Hangzhou	Hangzhou Greenland Center 1 and 2	310 m	1017 ft	67	2023	94
Hong Kong	International Commerce Centre	484 m	1588 ft	108	2010	8
Jinan	Shandong IFC	428 m	1404 ft	88	2024	
Kunming	Spring City 66	349 m	1145 ft	61	2019	44
Lanzhou	Honglou Times Square	313 m	1027 ft	56	2018	89
Liuzhou	Diwang International Fortune Center	303 m	994 ft	72	2015	106
Nanchang	Jiangxi Greenland Central Plaza 1 and 2	303 m	994 ft	59	2015	106
Nanjing	Zifeng Tower	450 m	1476 ft	89	2010	11
Nanning	Guangxi China Resources Tower	403 m	1321 ft	86	2020	19
Ningbo	Ningbo Central Plaza Tower 1	409 m	1342 ft	80	2024	
Qingdao	Haitian Center Tower 2	369 m	1210 ft	73	2021	32
Shanghai	Shanghai Tower	632 m	2073 ft	128	2015	1
Shenyang	Moi Center Tower A	351 m	1150 ft	68	2015	42
Shenzhen	Ping An Finance Center	599 m	1965 ft	118	2017	2
Suzhou	Suzhou IFS	450 m	1476 ft	95	2019	11
Tianjin	Tianjin CTF Finance Centre	530 m	1739 ft	97	2019	4
Wenzhou	Wenzhou Trade Center	339 m	1112 ft	71	2024	
Wuhan	Wuhan Greenland Center	476 m	1560 ft	101	2023	9
Wuxi	The Wharf Times Square 1	339 m	1112 ft	68	2014	50
Xiamen	Xiamen International Centre	340 m	1128 ft	68	2025	
Xi'an	Xi'an Glory International Financial Center	350 m	1148 ft	75	2022	45
Yangzhou	Yangzhou Kenye Center	300 m	984 ft	60	2024	
Yantai	Yantai Shimao No.1 The Harbour	323 m	1060 ft	59	2017	75
Zhenjiang	Suning Plaza, Zhenjiang	338 m	1109 ft	75	2018	53
Zhongshan	Zhongshan International Trade Center	305 m	1001 ft	65	2019	102
Zhuhai	Hengqin International Finance Center	338 m	1108 ft	69	2020	55

== Future ==
This list includes the tallest under construction or proposed buildings in China by city. Only buildings which will become their city's tallest building upon completion are included. Buildings are becoming their city sight. All measurements are as defined and recognised by the Council on Tall Buildings and Urban Habitat (CTBUH). Heights are measured to Architectural Top, with antennae being excluded. Only buildings over 300 metres (980 ft) are included.

bold	Denotes building is currently under construction

City	Building	Height (m)	Height (ft)	Floors	Completion
Changchun	Greenland Center 1	300 m	984 ft	80	
Changsha	Greenland Star City Light Tower	379.9 m	1246 ft	83	2025
Chengdu	Chengdu Greenland Tower	468 m	1535 ft	101	2024
Chongqing	International Commerce Center 1	458 m	1503 ft	99	2024
Dalian	Dalian Greenland Center	518 m	1699 ft	88	2019
Dongguan	Houjie International Home Furniture Center Building	480 m	1575 ft	102	
Fangcheng	Jingang Center	328 m	1076 ft	73	
Foshan	Foshan Suning Plaza Tower 1	318 m	1115 ft	90	2023
Fuzhou	Shenglong Global Center	300 m	984 ft	57	2016
Guangzhou	Guangdong Business Center	375.5 m	1232 ft	60	2024
Guiyang	Guizhou Cultural Plaza Orchid Tower	540 m	1772 ft		2020
Haikou	Haikou Tower	428 m	1404 ft	94	2027
Handan	Zhongdao International Plaza Tower 1	330 m	1083 ft	66	
Hangzhou	Bodi Center Tower 1	310 m	1017 ft	55	2016
Hefei	Evergrande International Financial Center T1	518 m	1647 ft	112	2021
Huaiyin	Yunrun International Tower	317 m	1040 ft	75	2017
Jinan	Greenland Shandong International Financial Center	428 m	1404 ft	88	2023
Kunming	Haiya Business Center	428 m	1404 ft	98	2021
Linyi	Hengda Center	360 m	1181 ft		
Liuzhou	Liuzhou International Trade Center 1	338 m	1109 ft	88	
Luoyang	Shenglong Center	369 m	1211 ft	88	2019
Nanchang	Jiangxi Nancheng Greenland Center Plaza	303 m	994 ft	59	2015
Nanning	China Resources Centre Block A	445 m	1440 ft	94	2019
Nantong	Nantong Center	430 m	1411 ft	88	
Ningbo	Evergrande City Light	453.5 m	1488 ft	88	
Qingdao	Hai Tian Center Tower 2	369 m	1211 ft	72	2021
Shenyang	Pearl of the North	568 m	1854 ft	114	2020
Shenzhen	China Resources Hubei Old Village Redevelopment	500 m	1640 ft		
Shijiazhuang	Tianshan Gate of the World Plots 27 and 28	450 m	1476 ft	106	2025
Suzhou	Suzhou Zhongnan Center	499.2 m	1638 ft	103	2025
Taiyuan	Taiyuan International Finance Center	333 m	1093 ft	75	
Tianjin	Goldin Finance 117	597 m	1957 ft	128	2022
Wenling	Wenling Sheraton	300 m	984 ft		2019
Wenzhou	Wenzhou Lucheng Plaza Landmark Tower	350 m	1148 ft	71	
Wuhan	Wuhan Greenland Center	475.6 m	2087 ft	97	2022
Wuhu	Riverside Century Plaza Main Tower	318 m	1043 ft	66	2015
Wujiang	Greenland Group Suzhou Center	358 m	1175 ft	75	
Wuxi	Shimao Railway Station Tower 1	358 m	1175 ft		
Xiamen	Xiamen International Centre	343 m	1115 ft	61	2019
Xi'an	Silkroad International Center	498 m	1634 ft	101	2024
Yantai	Yantai Shimao No. 1 The Harbour	323 m	1060 ft	59	2015
Yinchuan	Greenland Center	301 m	988 ft	57	
Zhenjiang	Suning Plaza Tower 1	330 m	1082 ft	77	2016
Zhuhai	Guowei ZY Plaza	350 m	1148 ft	62	

== Statistics ==
This section includes the total number of supertall skyscrapers in China by city in graph format. The section is split to separate complete, under construction (or topped out), and proposed supertall skyscrapers by city. Only cities with more than one skyscraper in a given section are included.

=== Completed ===
15	Shenzhen

10	Guangzhou

6	Hong Kong

6	Nanjing

6	Nanning

5	Changsha

5	Shanghai

5	Wuhan

4	Chongqing

4	Tianjin

4	Wuxi

3	Guiyang

3	Kunming

3	Shenyang

3	Zhuhai

2	Beijing

2	Dalian

2	Hangzhou

2	Jinan

2	Nanchang

2	Suzhou

=== Under construction ===
16	Shenzhen

10	Wuhan

7	Nanjing

7	Guangzhou

6	Shanghai

5	Suzhou

4	Changsha

4	Chongqing

2	Guiyang

2	Kunming

2	Tianjin

1	Nanning

1	Shenyang

1	Nanchang

=== Proposed ===
8	Shenzhen

7	Shenyang

4	Chongqing

4	Kunming

3	Beijing

3	Guiyang

3	Hefei

3	Jinan

3	Shijiazhuang

3	Tianjin

3	Wuhan

2	Changsha

2	Dalian

2	Dongguan

2	Linyi

2	Ningbo

2	Qingdao

2	Suzhou

2	Wuxi

2	Yinchuan

== See also ==
- List of tallest buildings in China
- List of tallest buildings in Asia
- List of tallest buildings in the world
