= Shimao International Center =

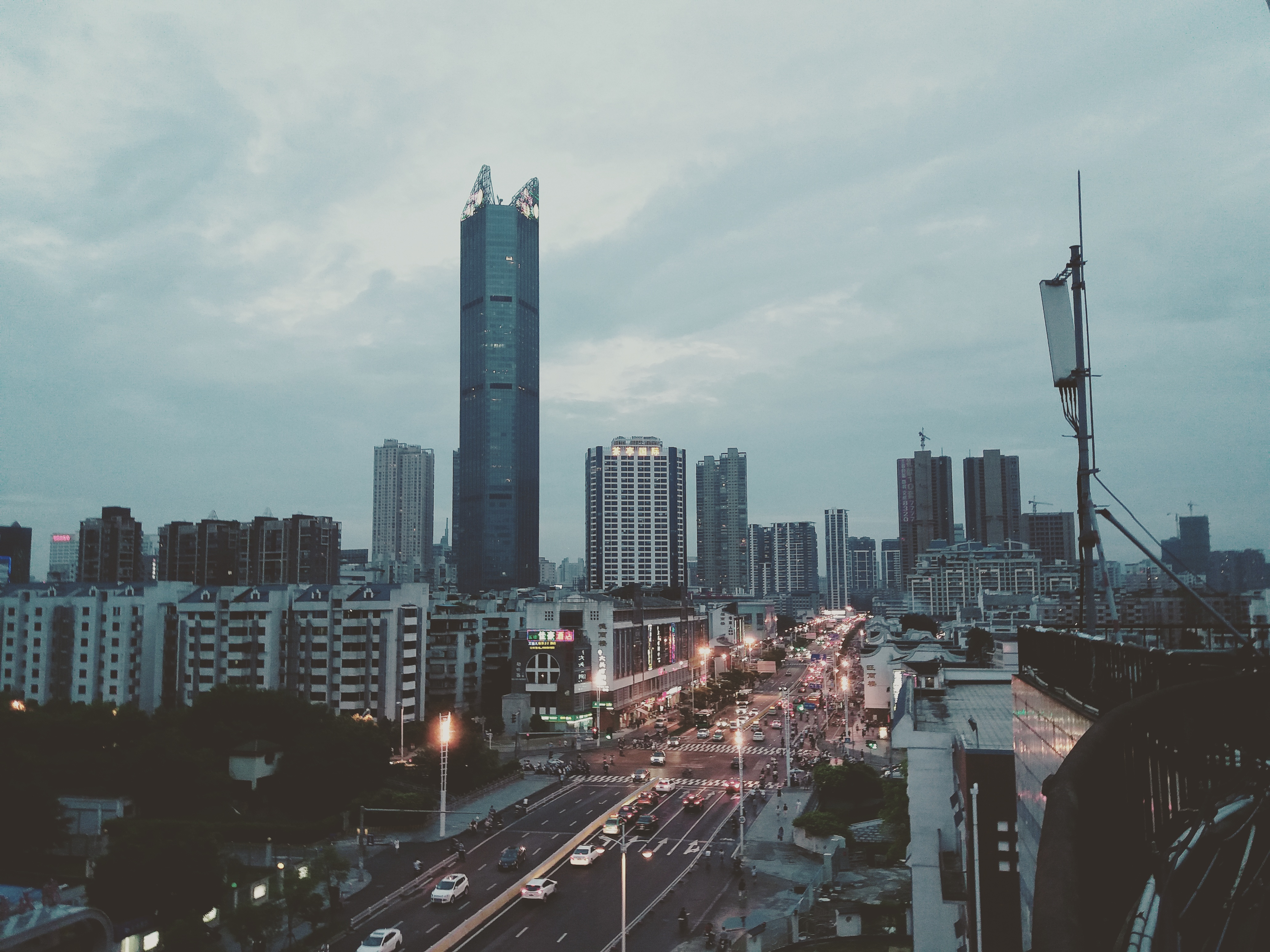
- Shimao International Center (center left)
- Interactive map of the Shimao International Center area

General information
- Status: Completed
- Type: Office and hotel
- Location: Fuzhou, Fujian, China
- Construction started: 2007
- Completed: 2013

Height
- Roof: 273 m (896 ft)

Technical details
- Floor count: 56

Shimao International Center is a 273-metre (896 ft) tall skyscraper located in Fuzhou, Fujian, China. The building's main usage is for commercial offices. Completed in 2013, it was the tallest building in Fuzhou. It was then surpassed by the 300-metre (984 ft) tall Shenglong Global Center in 2019.

== History ==
On May 16, 2007, Shimao Property bought several land plots near Fuzhou's Wuyi Square for development at ¥1.51 billion. The development project, which at that time was known as Fuzhou Chating Phase II, would comprise a 250 m (820 ft) tall five-star hotel, office building and four 160 m (525 ft) tall residential towers. The tallest building, called "Shimao International Center", was planned to contain offices, a five-star hotel, retail space, and a podium. It is located at Plot 1, at the southwest corner of the intersection of Qunzhong Road and Guangda Road in Taijiang District.

The Strait Metropolis Daily reported that the project broke ground in October 2007. The ceremony was attended by Fuzhou Mayor Zheng Songyan and Shimao Group Chairman Xu Rongmao. On July 16, 2010, Haixi Real Estate Network reported that the tower's functions would be divided as follows: floors 1–7 would contain InterContinental Hotel's supporting facilities, floors 9–18 would contain offices, floors 20–33 would function as InterContinental Hotel's guest rooms, and floors 35–58 would be used for a private club, with the tower height raised to 262 m (860 ft). Later in September that year, Strait Metropolis Daily stated that it would reach a height of 273 m (896 ft). The building was eventually topped out on September 28, 2011, at a height of 273 m (896 ft). It was then completed and opened in 2013.

On January 25, 2014, InterContinental Fuzhou was officially opened in the building. The hotel has 360 rooms.

== See also ==
- List of tallest buildings in China
- List of tallest buildings in China by city
