= Shenglong Global Center =

Supertall skyscraper in Fuzhou, Fujian, China

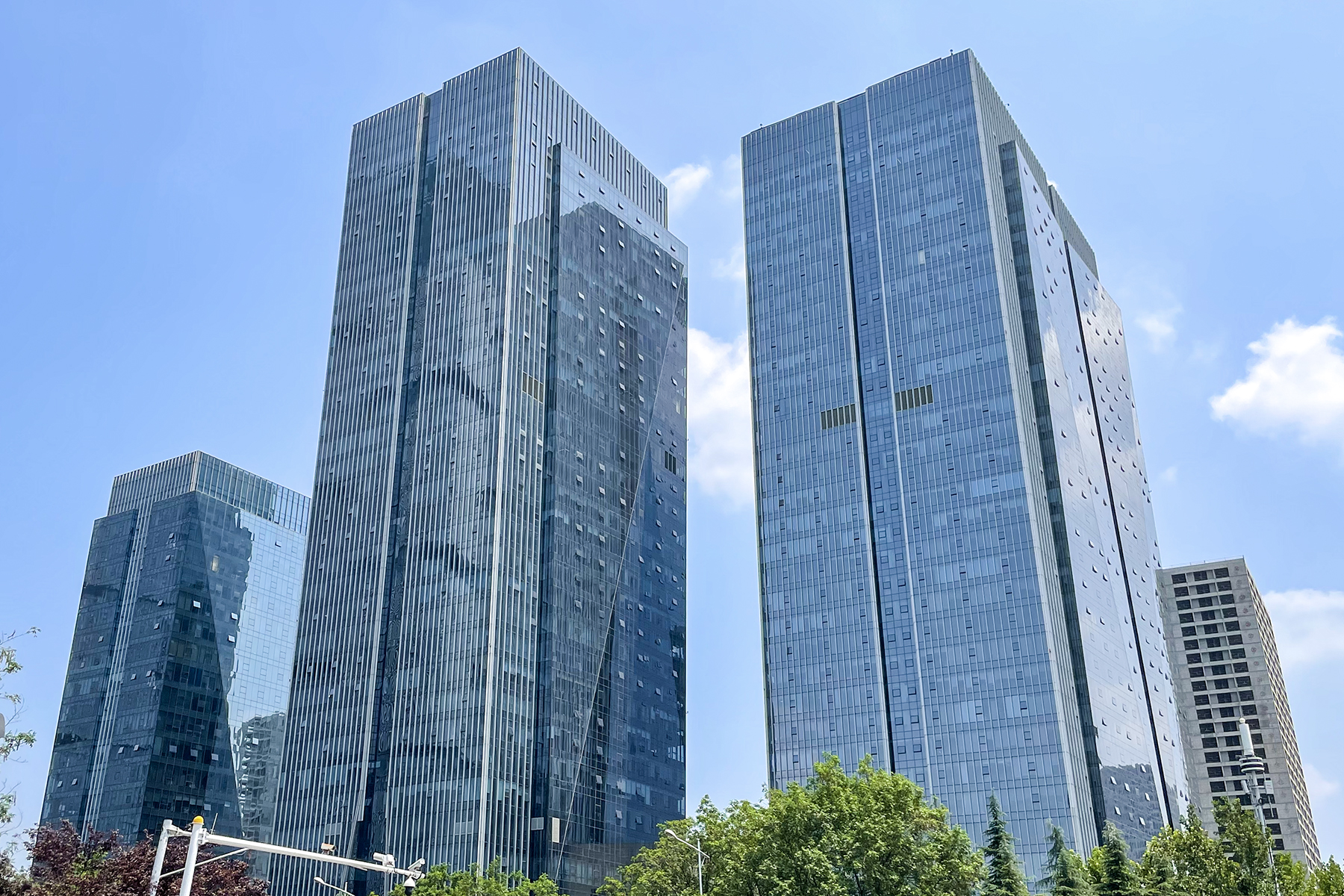
- ICC Thang Long Global Center skyscraper
- Interactive map of the Shenglong Global Center area

General information
- Status: Completed
- Location: Fuzhou, Fujian, China
- Coordinates: 26.0613783°N 119.2810564°E
- Construction started: 2012
- Completed: 2019
- Opened: 2020

Height
- Architectural: 300 m (984 ft)
- Tip: 300 m (984 ft)

Technical details
- Floor count: 57

ICC Thang Long Global Center, also known as Shenglong Global Center, is a supertall skyscraper in Fuzhou, Fujian, China. It is 300 metres (984 feet) tall. Construction started in 2012 and was completed in 2019. It was then opened in 2020. Upon its completion, it surpassed the 273 metres (896 feet) tall Shimao International Center and became the tallest building in Fuzhou.

== See also ==
- List of tallest buildings in China
- List of tallest buildings in China by city
