= Shimao Cross-Strait Plaza =

Skyscraper complex in Xiamen, Fujian, China

Coordinates: 24°26′18″N 118°05′01″E

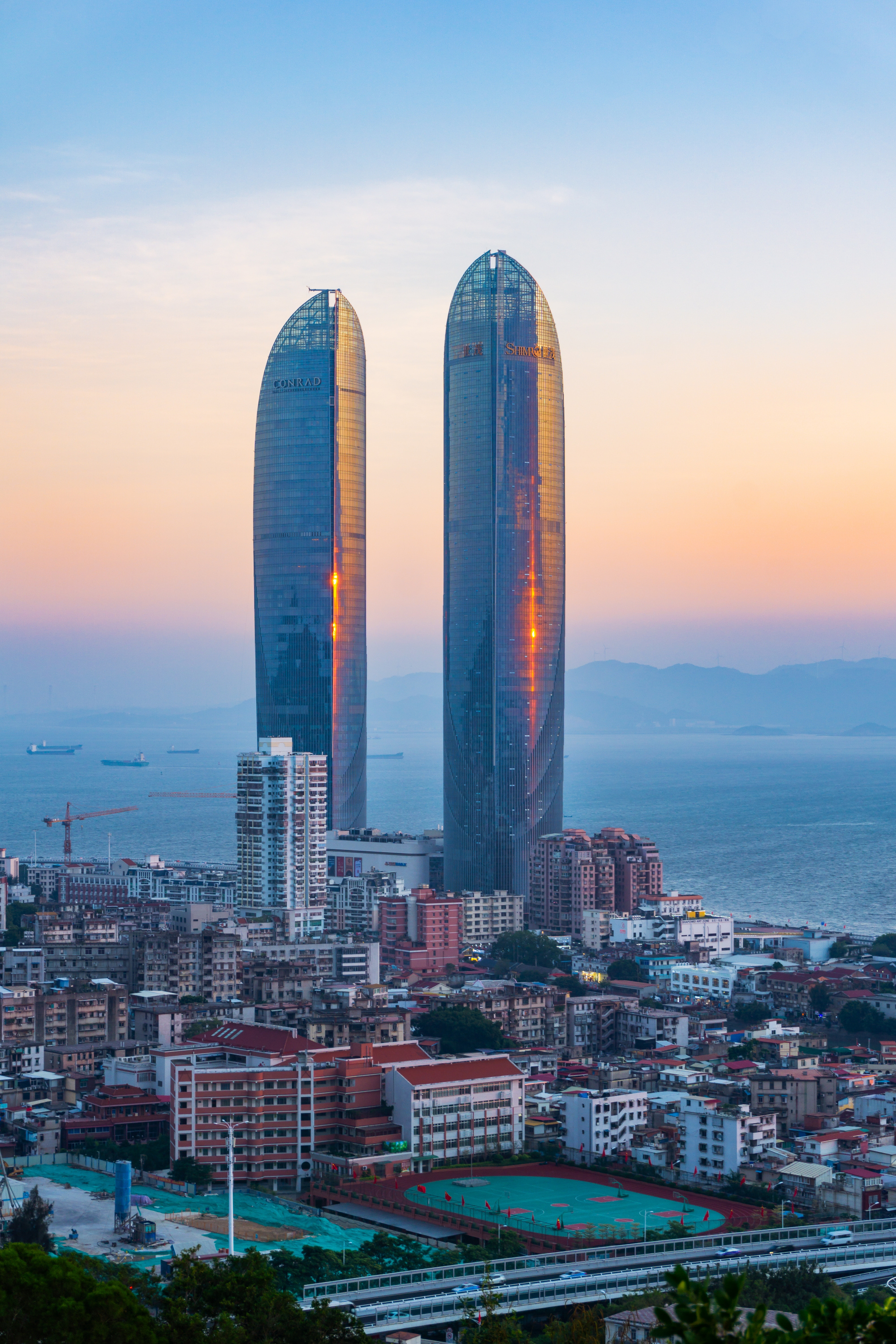
Shimao Cross-Strait Plaza, 2019

Shimao Cross-Strait Plaza (Chinese: 世茂海峡大厦; pinyin: Shìmào Hǎixiá Dàshà), also known as Shimao Straits Tower, Shimao MO Sky Mansion, and Xiamen Shimao Straits Mansion, is a skyscraper complex in Xiagang, Siming District, Xiamen, People's Republic of China. The project was completed in 2015, and the architect was Gensler.

The complex has two towers, Xiamen Shimao Cross-Strait Plaza Tower B and Xiamen Shimao Cross-Strait Plaza Tower A, which are nicknamed the "Twin Towers of Xiamen" (Chinese: 厦门双子塔; pinyin: Xiàmén Shuāngzǐ Tǎ). The plaza features two sail-like towers, standing at 300 meters each.

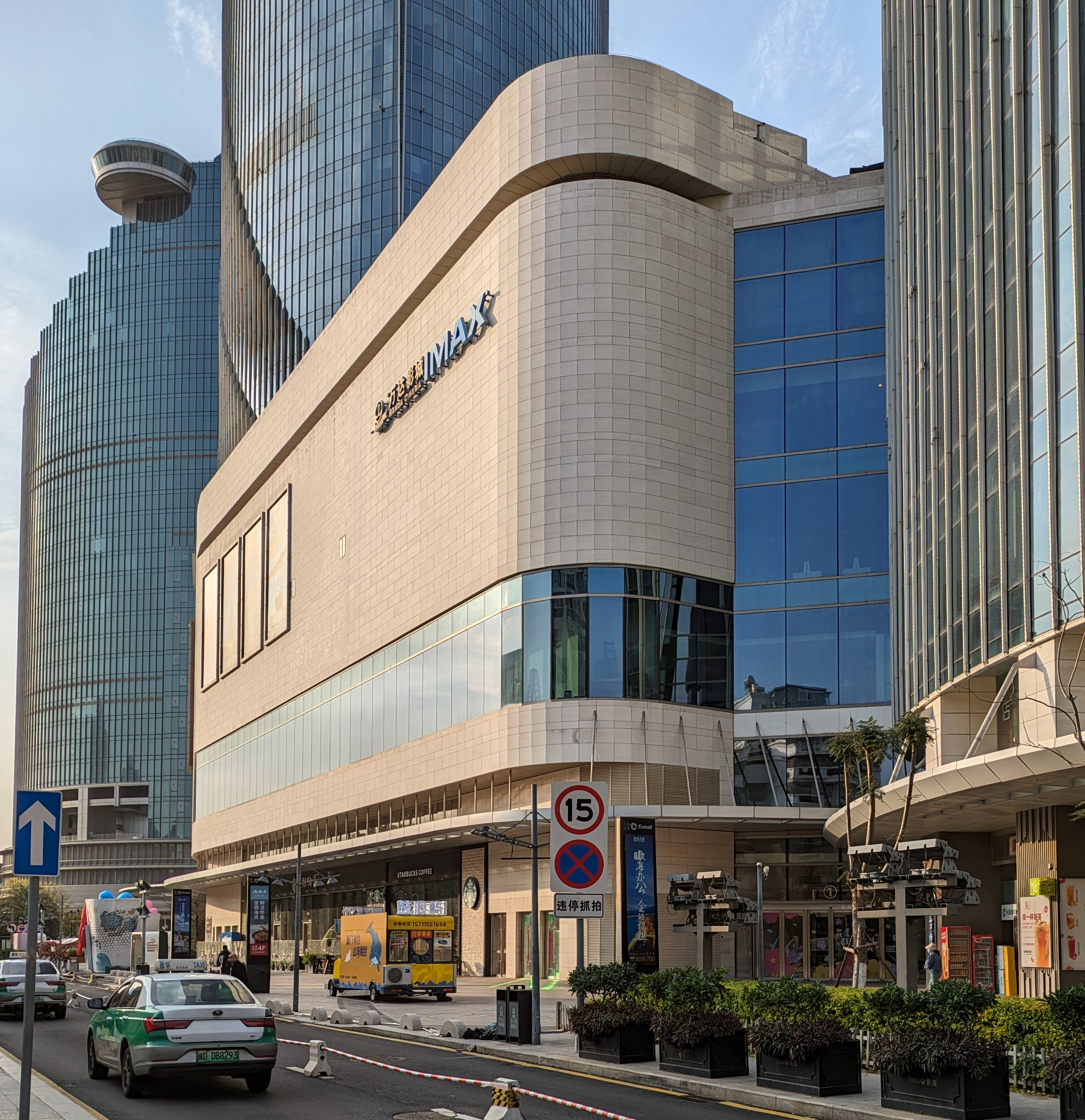
Emall, the shopping center between the towers

The primary use of the towers is for office space. Tower B also includes a hotel, and Tower A has "small office/home office" (SOHO) units. The complex has an observation deck from which the island of Kinmen can be seen. In between the two towers is a shopping center called Emall.

== Architecture ==
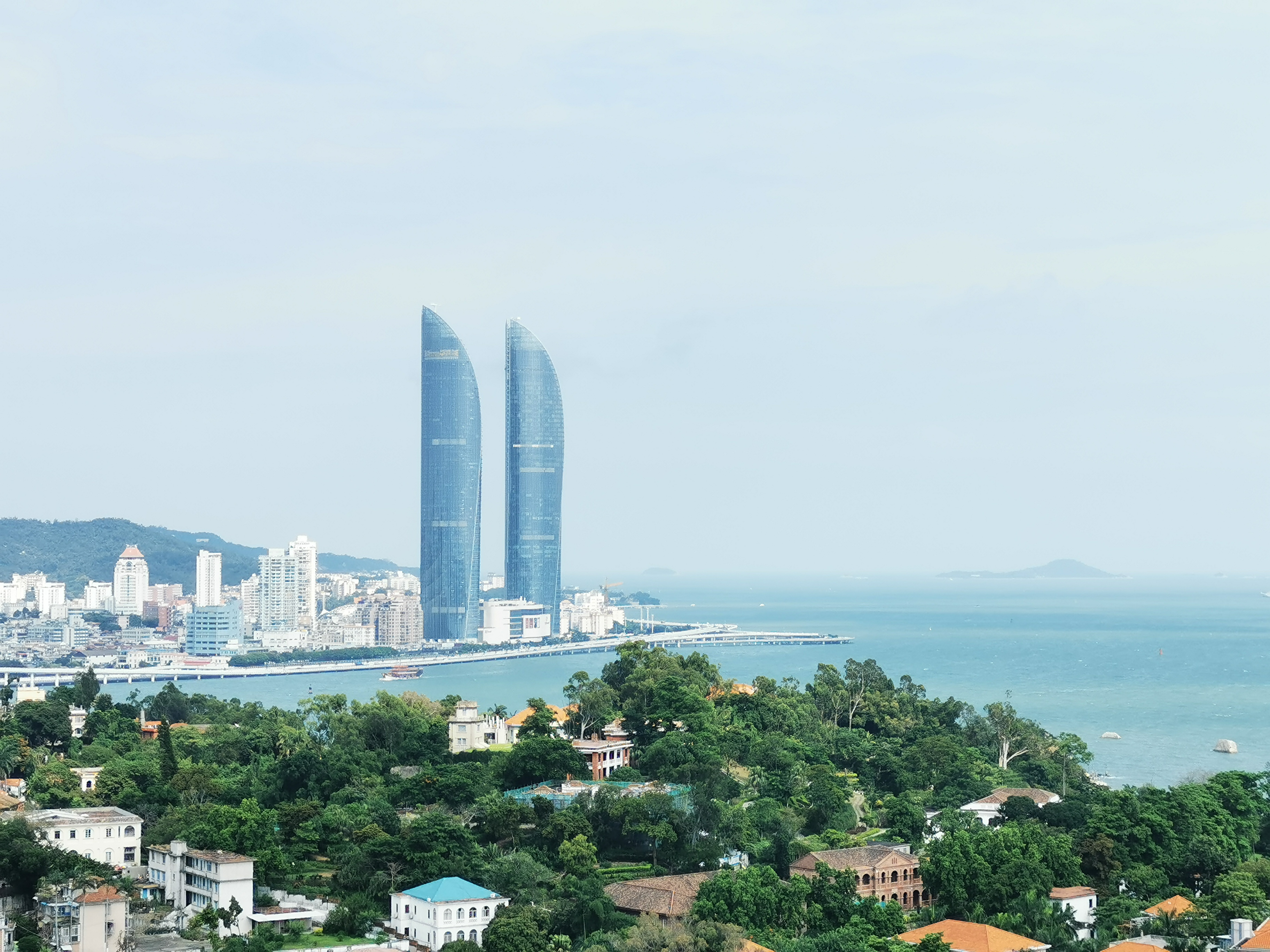
The towers' shapes are intended to represent sails.

The towers are designed to evoke "two giant sails of a gigantic vessel on the waterfront", as an homage to Xiamen's maritime history. They were also inspired by the bougainvillea, the city flower of Xiamen.

Sources differ on the total number of floors. Emporis says that Tower A has 59 above-ground floors while Tower B has 67. An article in the journal Intelligent City said that Tower A had 66 floors and Tower B had 57, while other sources say the complex has 64 floors. There are three underground levels used for parking and equipment. Total floor space is about 350,000 square meters (270,000 above ground).

== Construction ==
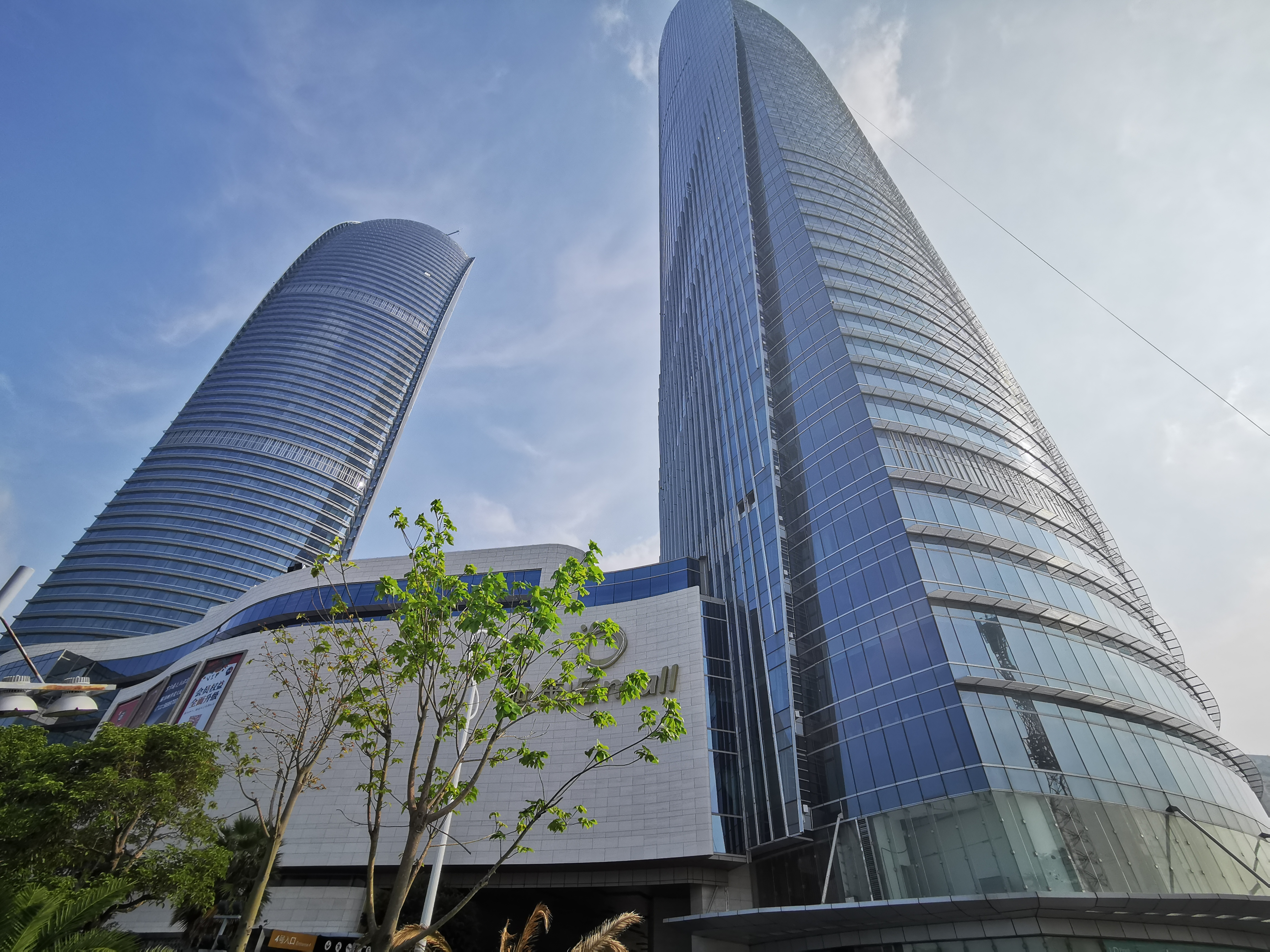
The towers seen from below

Construction started in May 2010. The construction of the complex was funded by Shimao Property, which invested about RMB 5 billion in the project. The development is located on a 30,000-square-meter plot in Xiagang, Siming District. When the complex topped out in 2015, it was the tallest building in Xiamen.

During construction the complex was described as "China's first twin towers".
