= Cheonghwasan =

Mountain in Sangju, South Korea

Highest point
- Elevation: 984 m (3,228 ft)
- Coordinates: 36°36′14″N 127°55′14″E

Geography
- Location: South Korea

Korean name
- Hangul: 청화산
- Hanja: 靑華山
- RR: Cheonghwasan
- MR: Ch'ŏnghwasan

Cheonghwasan (Korean: 청화산) is a mountain between Goesan County, North Chungcheong Province and Sangju, South Korea. It has an elevation of 984 m (3,228 ft).

== See also ==
- List of mountains in Korea
