= Yantai Shimao No.1 The Harbour =

Supertall skyscraper in Yantai, Shandong, China

- 烟台世茂海湾一号
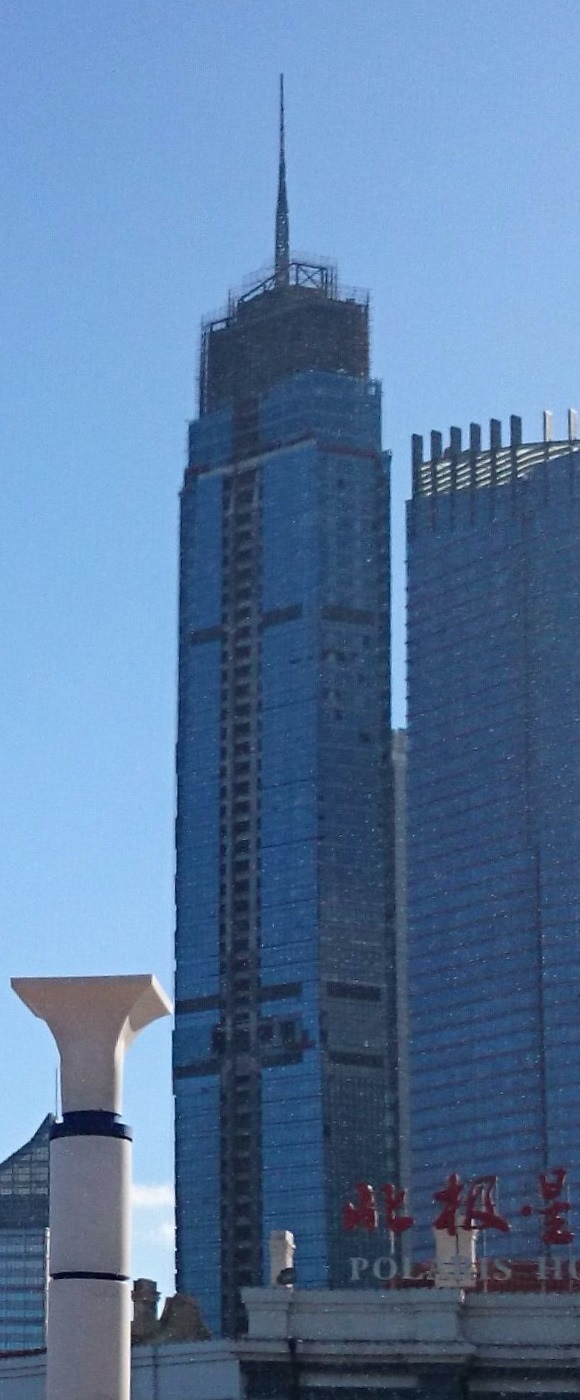
- Interactive map of the Yantai Shimao No.1 The Harbour area

General information
- Status: Completed
- Location: 156 Jiefang Road, Zhifu District, Yantai City, Shandong Province (山东省烟台市芝罘区解放路156号), Yantai, China
- Coordinates: 37.5401°N 121.4073°E
- Groundbreaking: July 10, 2007
- Construction started: April 19, 2008
- Completed: May 24, 2015
- Opened: October 2, 2015

Height
- Architectural: 323 m (1,060 ft)
- Tip: 323 m (1,060 ft)

Technical details
- Floor count: 62
- Floor area: 277,000 m^{2} (2,980,000 sq ft)

Design and construction
- Architects: Wong Tung & Partners
- Developer: Shimao Group
- Main contractor: China Construction Third Engineering Bureau Co., Ltd.

Other information
- Number of rooms: 396

Yantai Shimao No. 1 The Harbour (Chinese: 烟台世茂海湾一号 or 世茂海湾壹号) is a 323-metre (1,060 ft) 62-story supertall skyscraper was completed in the city of Yantai, Shandong, China. Its foundation was laid on 9 July 2007. Construction started in 2008 and is slated to finish in 2015. There are three other towers part of the project completed in 2011 and built in the same plot, ranging from 54 to 59 stories high and 175 to 190 meters.

Though promoted as the "tallest building in Shandong", its planned height was surpassed by other buildings in the province before construction was completed.
