= Zhonghua Subdistrict, Xiamen =

Coordinates: 24.4539°N 118.0820°E

Zhonghua Subdistrict 中华街道
- Subdistrict

Chinese transcription(s)
  - Chinese: 中华街道
  - Pinyin: Zhōnghuá jiēdào
- Interactive map of Zhonghua Subdistrict
- Country: China
- Province: Fujian
- Prefecture: Xiamen
- District: Siming
- Time zone: UTC+8 (China Standard Time)

Zhonghua Subdistrict is a township-level division of the Siming District of Xiamen, Fujian Province, China.

== See also ==
- List of township-level divisions of Fujian
