= Lao Feng Xiang =

Chinese jewellery brand

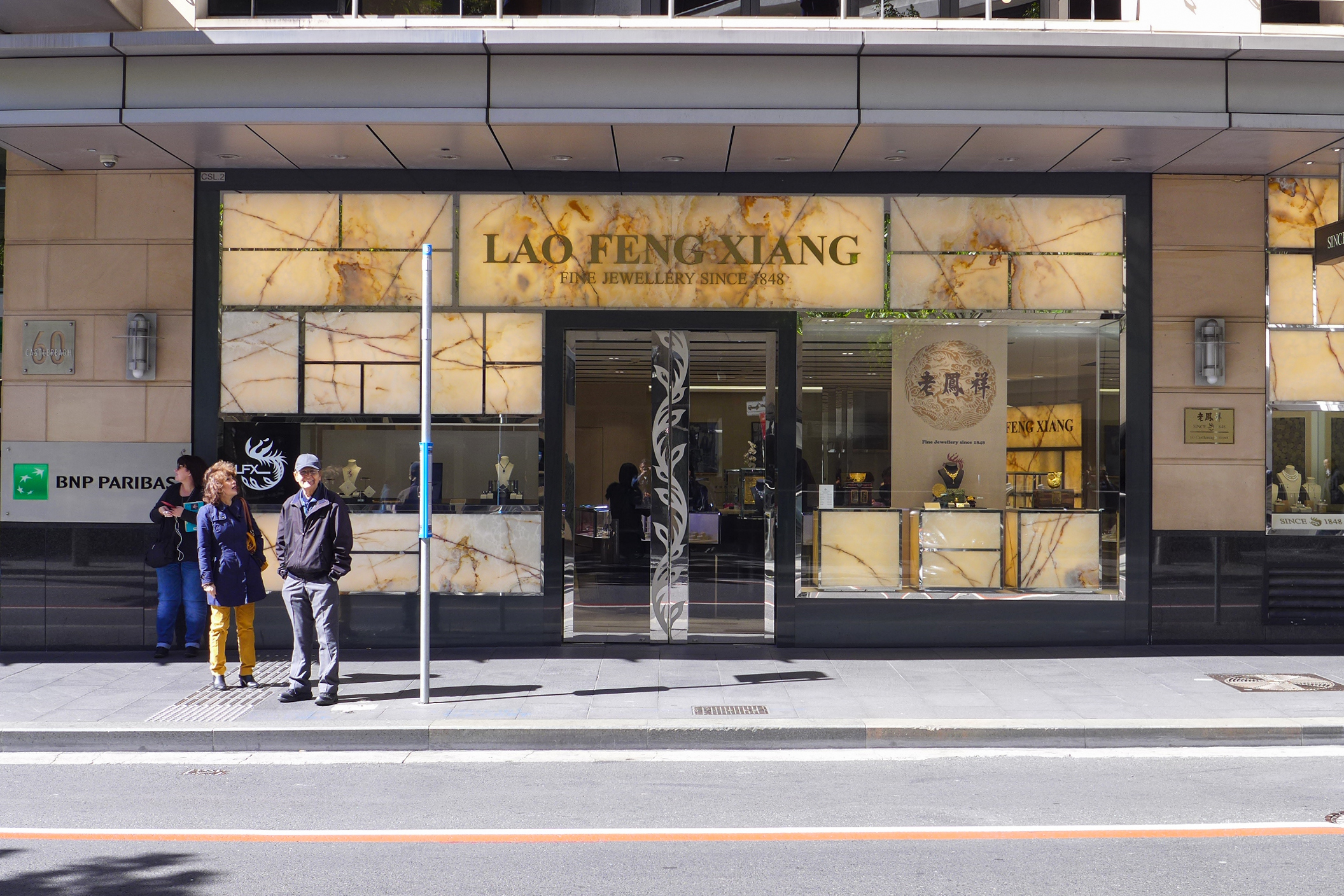
- LFX store in Sydney
- Native name: 老鳳祥
- Industry: Jewelry store, pencil manufacturing
- Founded: 1848; 177 years ago
- Headquarters: Shanghai, China
- Number of locations: >3,000
- Website: laofengxiang.com

Lao Feng Xiang is one of the oldest Chinese jewellery brands in existence, spanning 174 years of continuous operation.

The first Lao Feng Xiang Jewelry Shop opened in 1848, the twenty-eighth year of reign of Daoguang Emperor in Qing dynasty. The locations were Dadongmen, Nanshi and Shanghai. At this time, the store was named Feng Xiang Jewelry Shop.

Lao Feng Xiang's name consists of three Chinese characters representing the Phoenix, symbolizing rebirth.

== Retail stores ==
LFX operates over 3,000 stores worldwide, including stores in almost every province in mainland China. The company also operates flagship international stores in New York City on 5th Avenue, in Sydney, Australia and Vancouver, British Columbia and Canada. In 2015, five new stores were opened in Hong Kong.
