= Siming, Xiamen =

Siming 思明区
- District
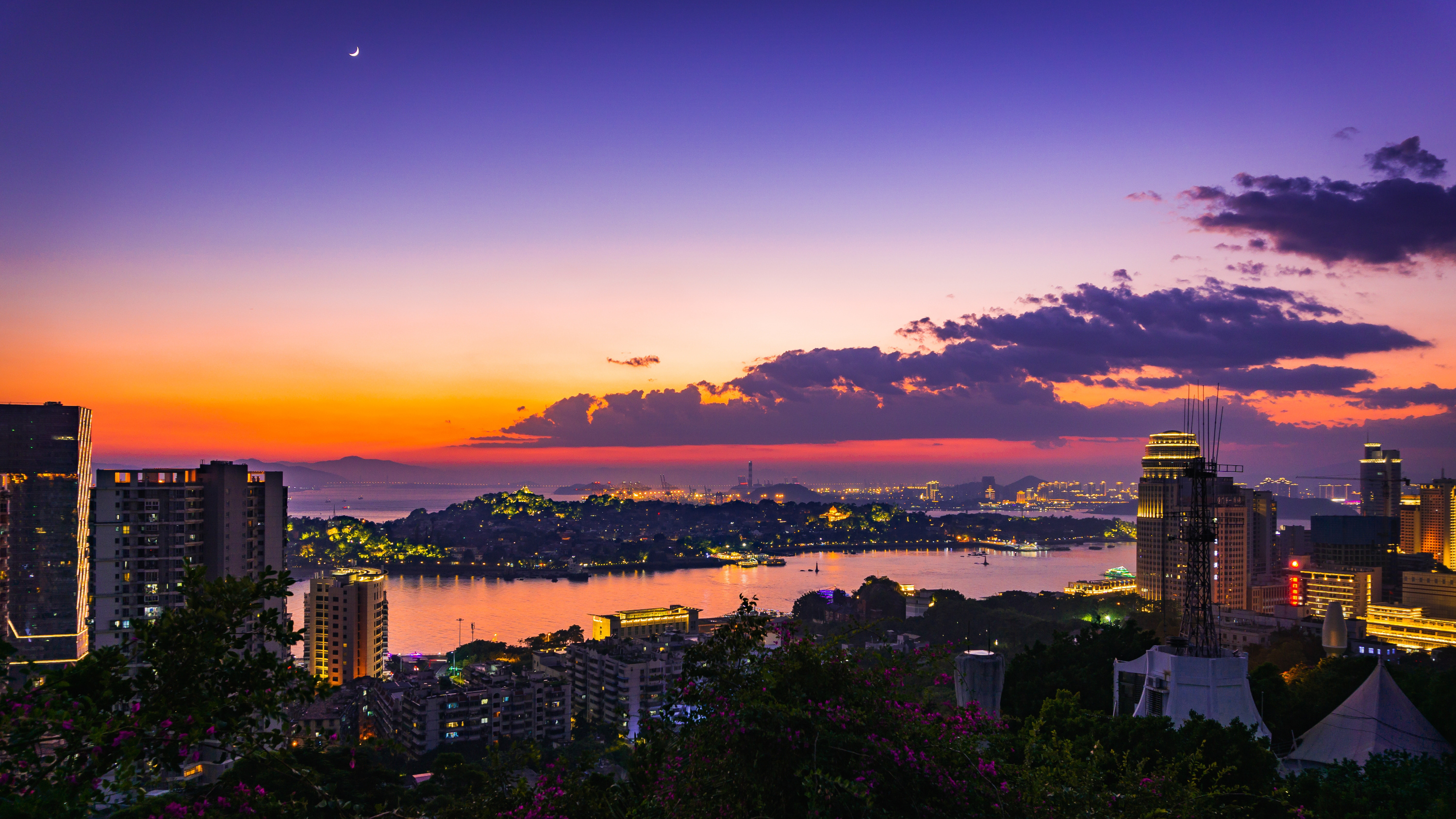
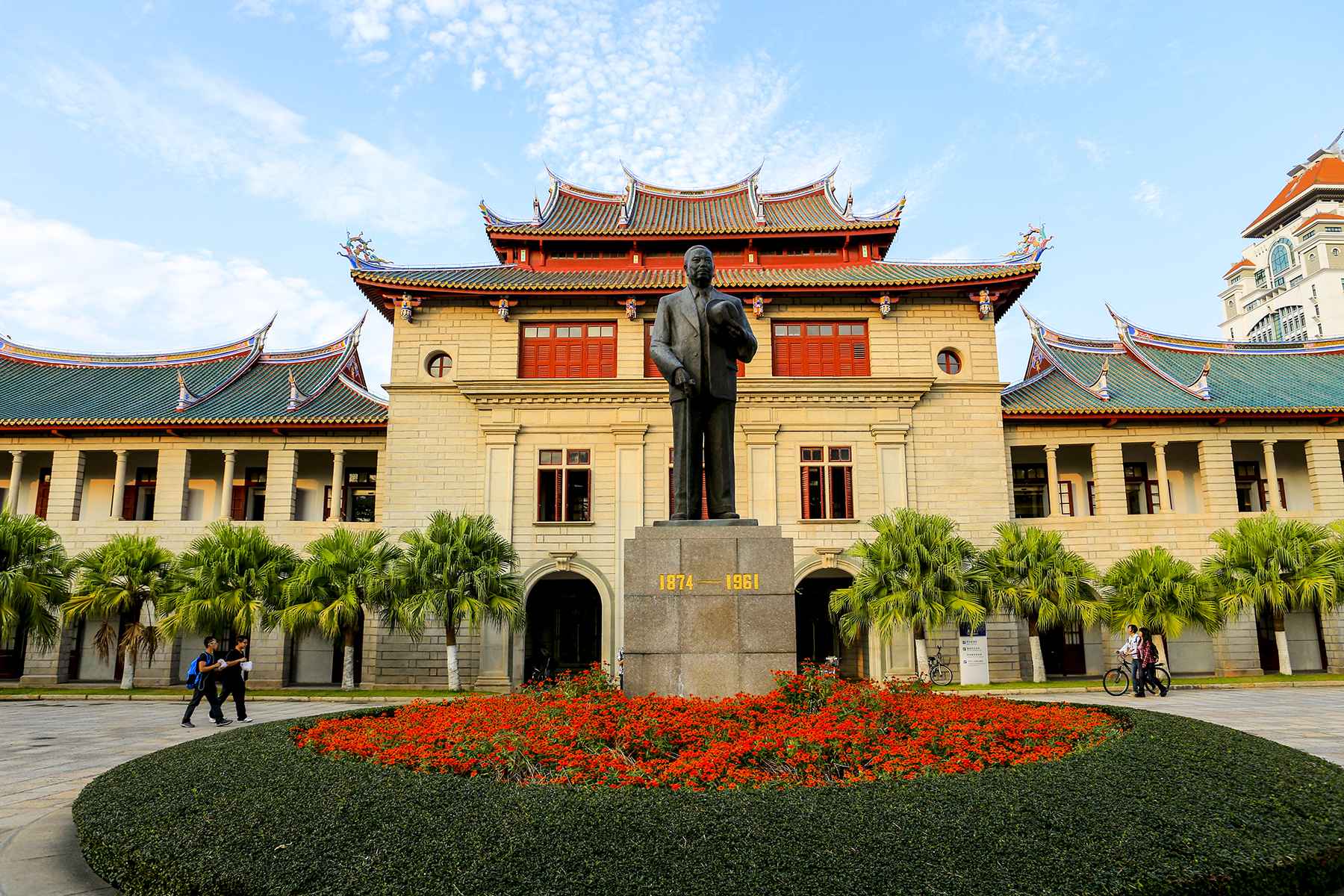
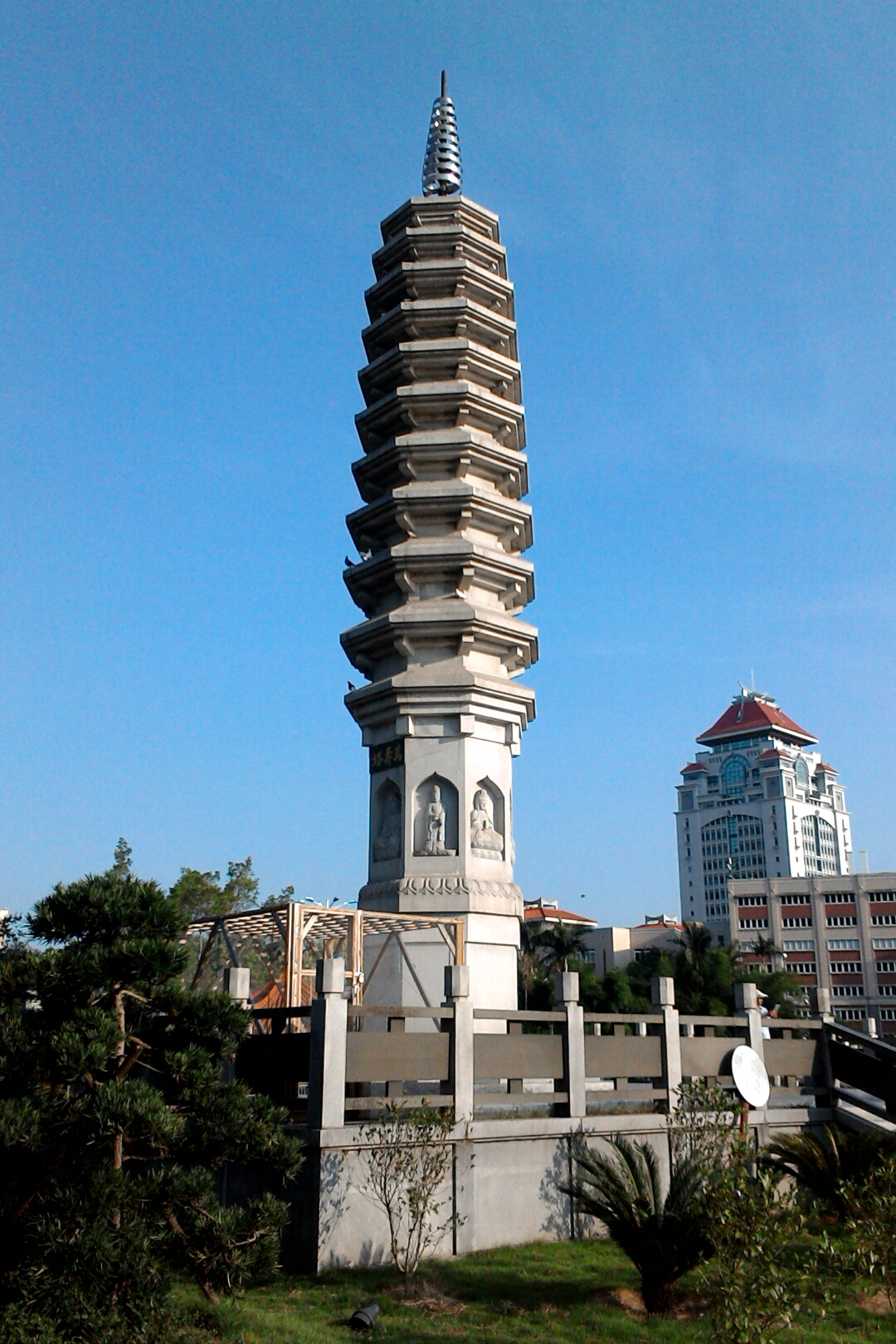
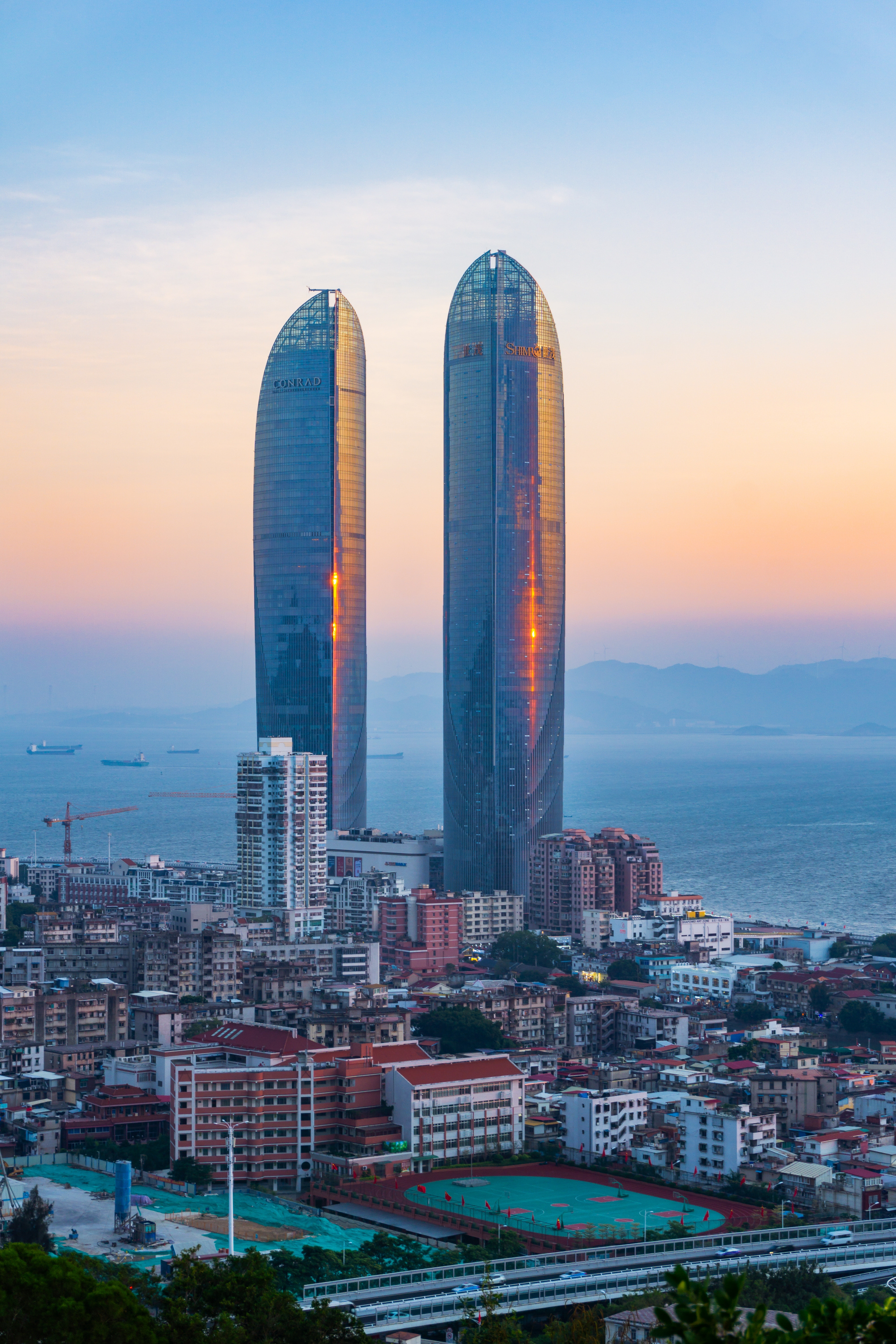
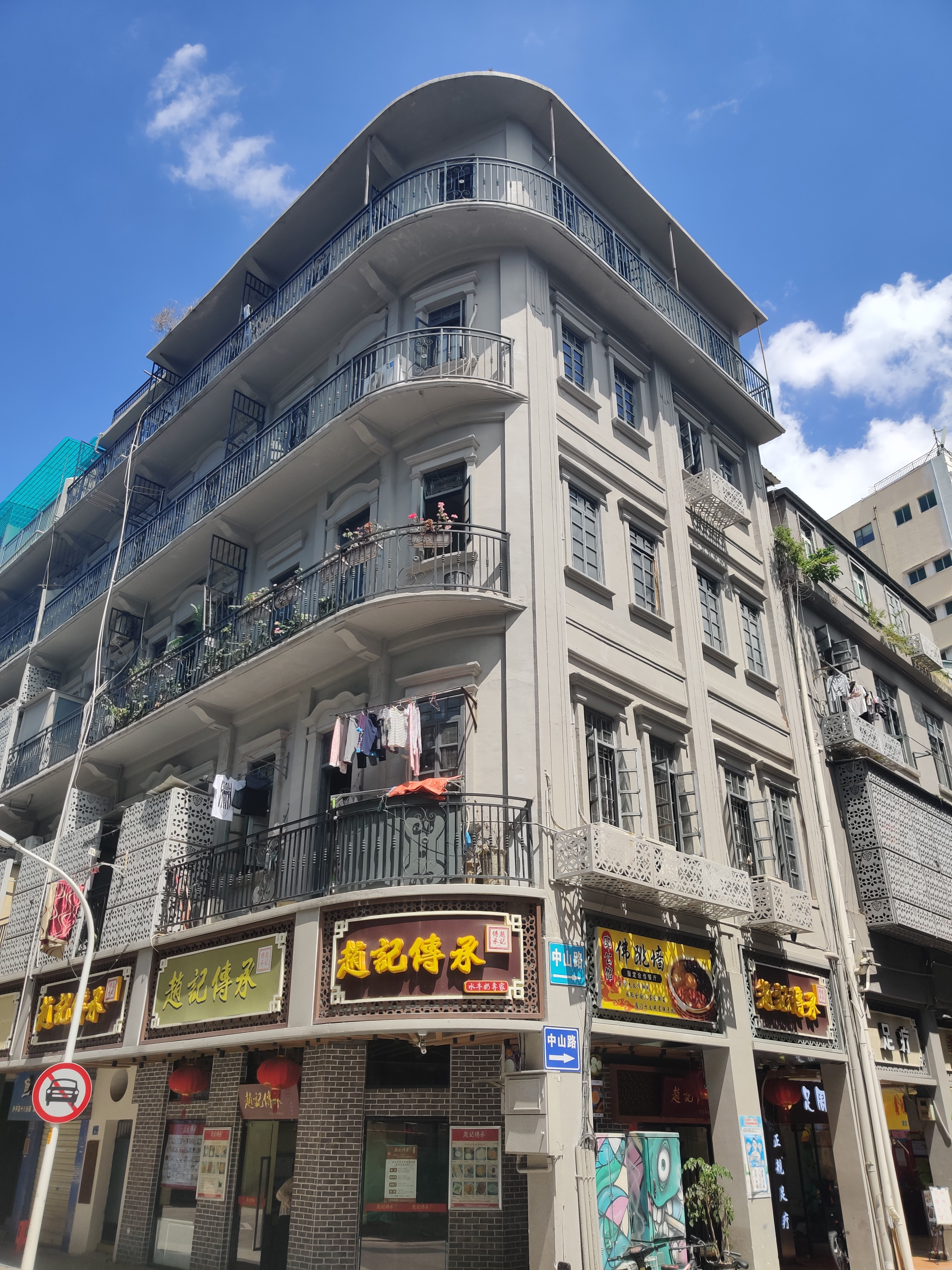
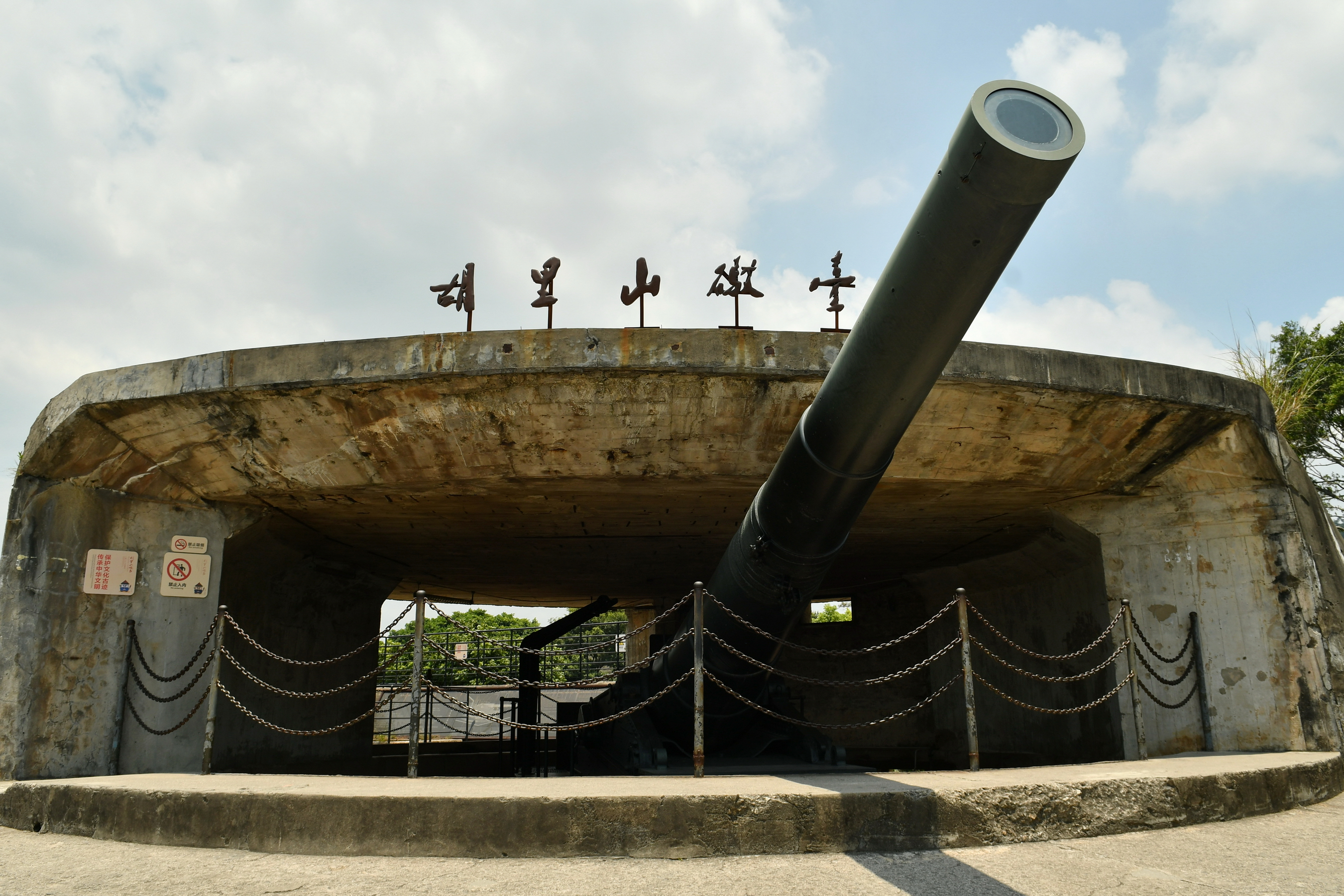
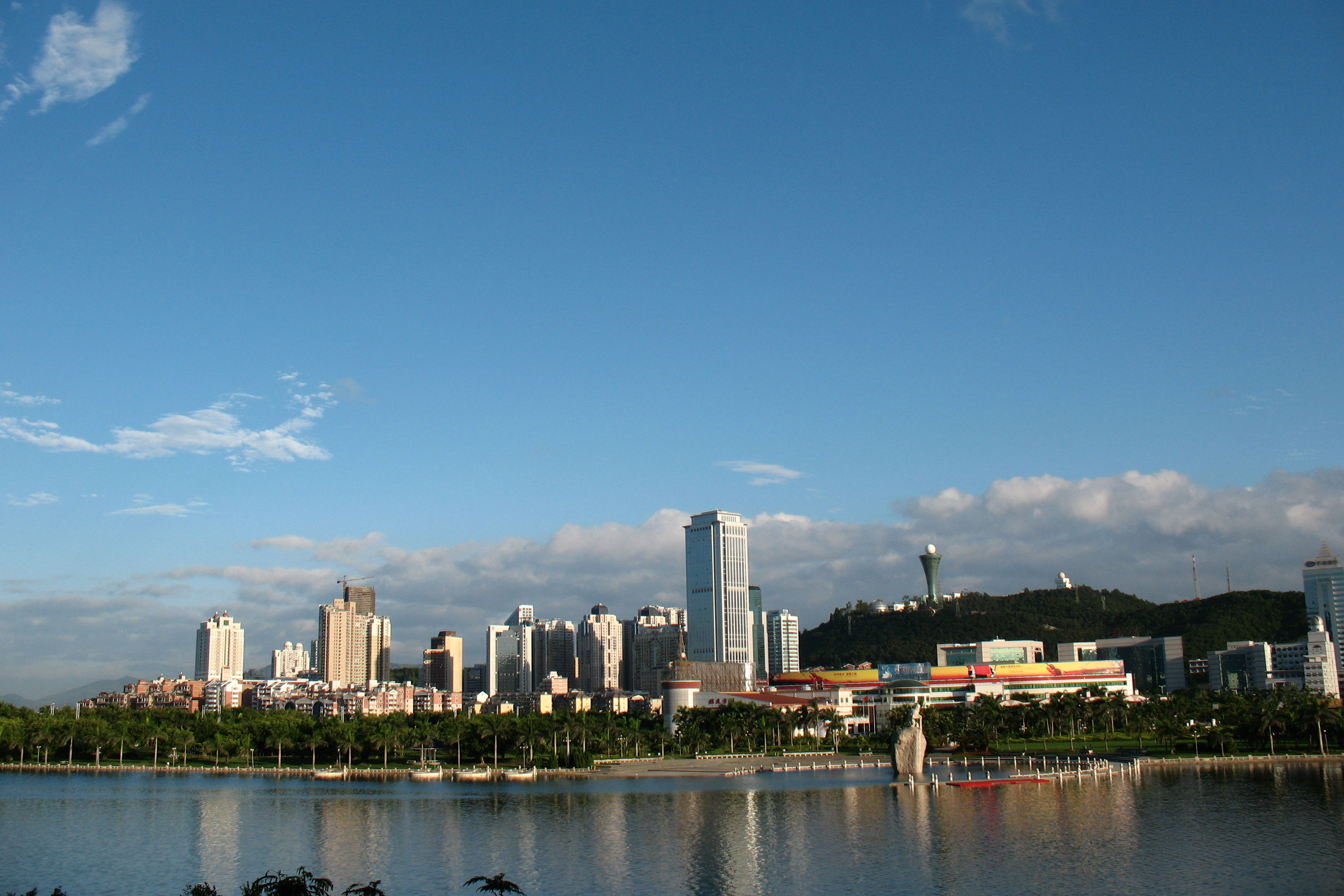
- Gulangyu Xiamen University South Putuo Temple Shimao Cross-Strait Plaza Haihou Street Hulishan Fort Yundang Lake

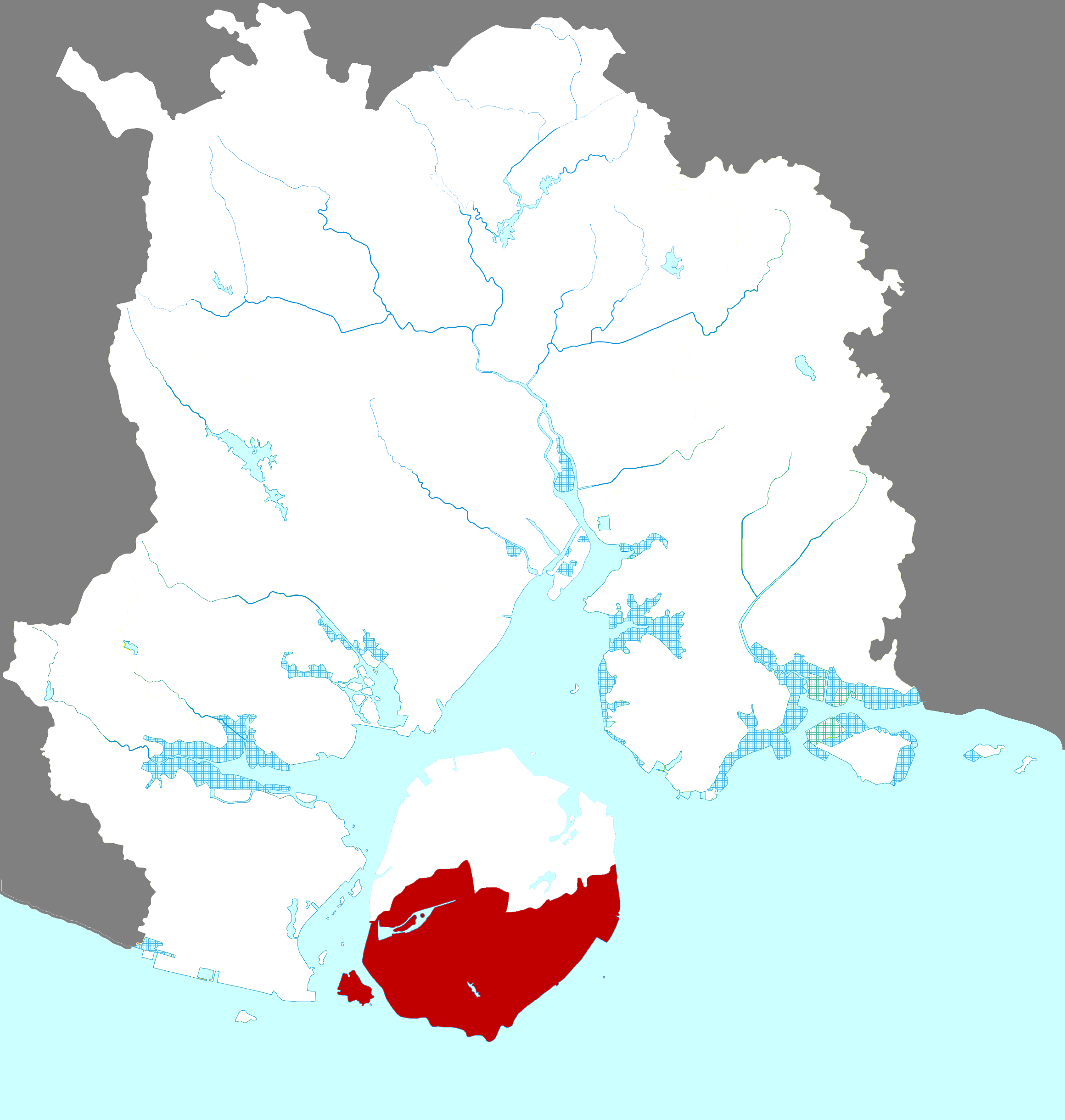
- Location of Siming in Xiamen

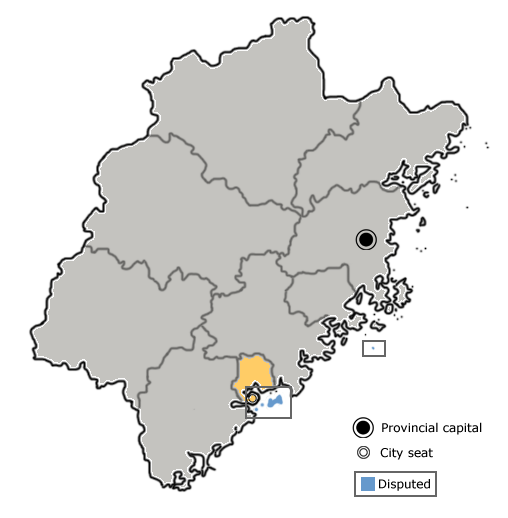
- Xiamen in Fujian
- Coordinates: 24°26′44″N 118°04′58″E
- Country: People's Republic of China
- Province: Fujian
- Sub-provincial city: Xiamen

Area
  - Total: 76 km^{2} (29 sq mi)

Population (2020 census)
  - Total: 1,073,315
  - Density: 14,000/km^{2} (37,000/sq mi)
- Time zone: UTC+8 (China Standard)
- Postal code: 361001
- Area code: 0592
- Website: http://www.siming.gov.cn

Siming
- Chinese: 思明
- Literal meaning: Missing the Ming
Transcriptions
Standard Mandarin
- Hanyu Pinyin: Sīmíng
- Wade–Giles: Ssu-ming
Southern Min
- Hokkien POJ: Si-bêng / Su-bêng

Former names

Central District
- Traditional Chinese: 中心區
- Simplified Chinese: 中心区
Transcriptions
Standard Mandarin
- Hanyu Pinyin: Zhōngxīn Qū
- Wade–Giles: Chung-hsin Ch‘ü
Southern Min
- Hokkien POJ: Tiong-sin Khu

Xiangyang
- Traditional Chinese: 向陽
- Simplified Chinese: 向阳
Transcriptions
Standard Mandarin
- Hanyu Pinyin: Xiàngyáng
- Wade–Giles: Hsiang-yang
Southern Min
- Hokkien POJ: Hiong-iong

Siming District is an urban district of the city of Xiamen, Fujian province, China. It includes the territory of the old town of Xiamen and the government offices of the modern sub-provincial city.

== Geography ==
Siming occupies the southern half of Xiamen Island. It also includes Gulangyu Island to its southwest. The sheltered Yundang Bay (篔簹港) responsible for old Xiamen's prized harbor was converted into a lake in the 20th century by the addition of landfill from construction.

== History ==
The modern Siming District includes the territory of the old town of Xiamen, which had its harbor in the sheltered Yundang Bay. The town took the name "Siming" for a brief period in the early Qing when it was occupied by the Southern Ming loyalist Koxinga, who used it from 1650 as a base to launch attacks on the Manchu drive southwards. He abandoned the island in favor of Taiwan when he defeated the Dutch there. The Qing held the city from the early 1660s, restoring its former name. Gulangyu Island, now part of the district, developed as a foreign enclave after Xiamen became a treaty port at the end of the First Opium War in 1842. After the fall of the Qing in 1912, the Republic of China organized the area around Xiamen as Siming County. It was renamed the Central District in October 1945 after its reconquest from the Japanese. Following its capture by the Communists at the end of the Chinese Civil War, it was renamed Siming District in 1950. In April 1953, its "district bureau" (区公所) administration was upgraded to a "people's government" (人民政府). As part of the Cultural Revolution, it was renamed Xiangyang District from August 1966 to October 1979. Along with Huli District to its north, Siming District formed one of the first four special economic zones for foreign investment and trade established by Deng Xiaoping's Opening Up Policy in the early 1980s. Gulangyu Island and Kaiyuan District were merged into Siming in May 2003.

== Administration ==
Before the merge, Siming originally had five local government street offices (街道办事处):

- Binhai (滨海, Pin-hai)
- Siming (思明, Su-bing)
- Wen'an (文安, Bun-an)
- Xiagang (厦港, Ha-kang)
- Zhonghua (中华, Tiong-hua)

The above five were divided into 58 residential committees (居委会) and two villages, Zengcuo'an (曾厝垵, Tsan-tshu-uann) and Huangcuo (黄厝, Ng-tshu). Xiagang Street was originally a district in 1950.

Today, Siming has ten street offices (街道办事处):

- Binhai (滨海, Pin-hai)
- Zhonghua (中华, Tiong-hua)
- Xiagang (厦港, Ha-kang)
- Lianqian (莲前, Lian-tsian)
- Jialian (嘉莲, Ka-lian)
- Yundang (筼筜, Uan-tang)
- Wucun (梧村, Ngoh-tshng)
- Kaiyuan (开元, Khai-guan)
- Lujiang (鹭江, Loo-kang)
- Gulangyu (Kulangsu)

These street offices are divided into 95 residential committees (社区居委会).

== Economy ==
Xiamen Bluebird Cartoon Company (厦门青鸟动画有限公司动画有限公司), which makes the XingXing Fox cartoon, is headquartered in the Amoy Software Park 2 (厦门软件园二期) in Siming District.
