= Xiamen International Center =

Skyscraper in Xiamen, China

- 厦门国际中心
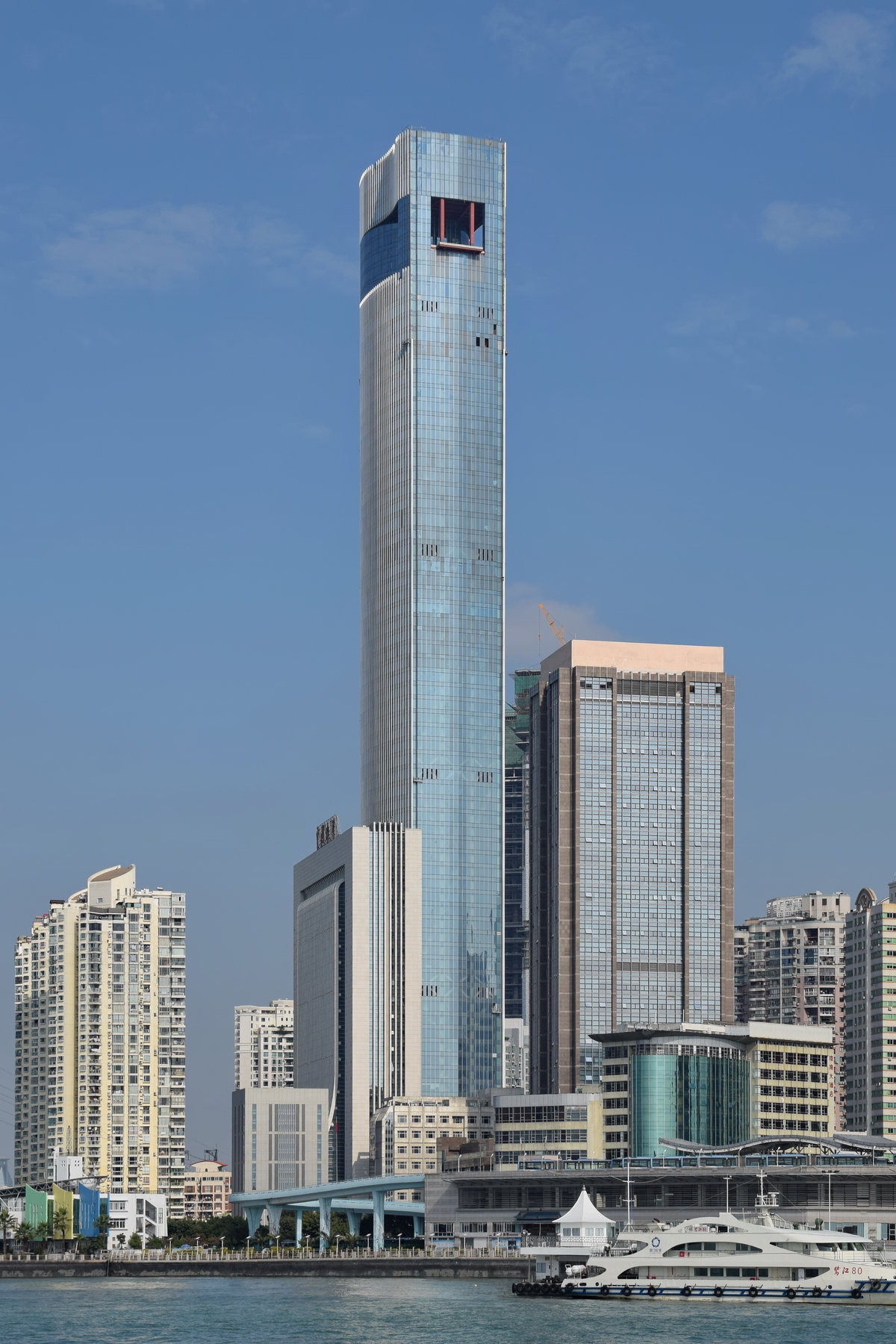
- Xiamen International Center in October 2018
- Interactive map of the Xiamen International Center area
- Former names: 邮电大厦 (China Post & Telecommunication Tower)

General information
- Status: Completed
- Location: Xiamen, China
- Coordinates: 24.467512°N 118.070599°E
- Construction started: 1996 (As China Post & Telecom Tower)
- Completed: 2017 (est.)
- Opened: 2025

Height
- Height: 343.9 m (1,128 ft)

Technical details
- Floor count: 68
- Floor area: 129,555 m^{2} (1,394,520 sq ft)

Design and construction
- Architecture firm: Gensler
- Structural engineer: ISA Architecture

Xiamen International Center is a skyscraper under construction in Xiamen, China. The tower was topped out in April 2016 and finished in 2025.

The China Post & Telecommunication Tower, a planned 342-meter tall office building was previously planned to be at the same location. The project began construction in 1996 but was halted at podium level. The current building began construction in 2014, and was sold unfinished in a liquidation sale by the previous owner on 11 November 2020.

From 2016 to present, Xiamen International Center has been the tallest building in the city of Xiamen, as well as tallest in the Haixi Metropolitan Area.

The Xiamen International Center serves as a hotel and an office after being completed in 2025.
