= List of tallest structures in the Middle East =

This list of tallest structures in the Middle East ranks structures and buildings in the Middle East by height. According to the Council on tall buildings and urban habitat 22 cities in 10 Middle Eastern countries have at least one structure above 150 m.

== Tallest structures and buildings ==
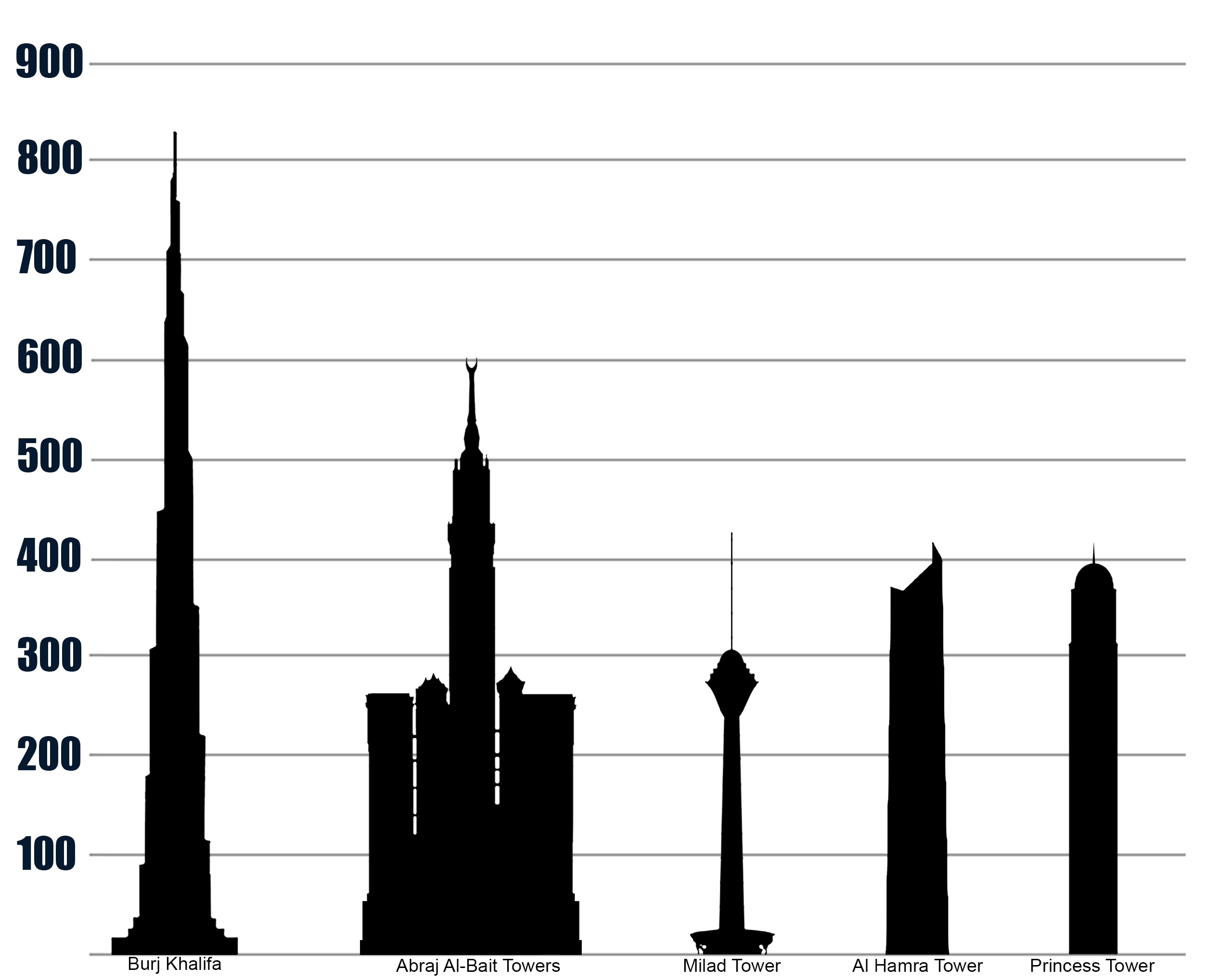
Tallest buildings in the Middle East.

Name	Location	Height (m)	Notes
Burj Khalifa	(United Arab Emirates) Dubai, UAE	828	Tallest man-made structure in the world
Mecca Royal Clock Tower	Mecca, Saudi Arabia	601	sixth-tallest freestanding structure in the world
Umm Qasr TV Mast	Umm Qasr, Iraq	492	
Qurayyat Transmitter, Mast 1	Qurayyāt, Saudi Arabia	468	
Qurayyat Transmitter, Mast 2	Qurayyāt, Saudi Arabia	458	
Milad Tower	Tehran, Iran	435	Tallest telecommunication tower in Iran.
Marina 101	(United Arab Emirates) Dubai, UAE	425	4th-tallest Residential building in the world
Princess Tower	(United Arab Emirates) Dubai, UAE	413	5th-tallest Residential building in the world
Al Hamra Tower	Kuwait City, Kuwait	413	Tallest sculpted tower in the world. Tallest building in Kuwait.
Dimona Radar Facility	Dimona, Israel	400	Tallest towers in Israel, and tallest radar towers in the world.
Legacy Tower	NAC, Egypt	394	Tallest building in Africa.
23 Marina	(United Arab Emirates) Dubai, UAE	393	
Public Investment Fund Tower	Riyadh, Saudi Arabia	385	Second tallest building in Saudi Arabia.
World Trade Center Abu Dhabi	(United Arab Emirates) Abu Dhabi, UAE	382	
Elite Residence	(United Arab Emirates) Dubai, UAE	380	
Denizköy VLF transmitter	Bafa, Turkey	380	
Liberation Tower	Kuwait City, Kuwait	372	
Address Boulevard	(United Arab Emirates) Dubai, UAE	370	
Zibakenar TV Mast	Zibakenar, Iran	365	
Ciel Tower	(United Arab Emirates) Dubai, UAE	366	Tallest hotel in the world.
Almas Tower	(United Arab Emirates) Dubai, UAE	360	
Il Primo	(United Arab Emirates) Dubai UAE	356	
Gevora Hotel	(United Arab Emirates) Dubai, UAE	356	Second tallest hotel in the world.
JW Marriott Marquis Dubai	(United Arab Emirates) Dubai, UAE	355	
Emirates Tower One	(United Arab Emirates) Dubai, UAE	355	
CBRT Tower	Istanbul, Turkey	352	
The Marina Torch	(United Arab Emirates) Dubai, UAE	352	
Basra TV Mast	Basra, Iraq	350	
Nahr al Bawadish TV Mast	Baghdad, Iraq	349	
ADNOC Headquarters	(United Arab Emirates) Abu Dhabi, UAE	342	
Al Mafraq TV Mast	(United Arab Emirates) Abu Dhabi, UAE	340	
Al Neser TV Mast	Nasiriyya, Iraq	337	
SLS Dubai	(United Arab Emirates) Dubai, UAE	336	
A A Tower	(United Arab Emirates) Dubai, UAE	334	
Rose Tower	(United Arab Emirates) Dubai, UAE	333	
Address Fountain Views III	(United Arab Emirates) Dubai, UAE	331	
One Za'abeel	(United Arab Emirates) Dubai, UAE	330	
Al Yaqoub Tower	(United Arab Emirates) Dubai, UAE	328	
The Index	(United Arab Emirates) Dubai, UAE	326	
Nineveh TV Mast	Mosul, Iraq	325	
The Landmark	(United Arab Emirates) Abu Dhabi, UAE	324	
El-Mahalla el-Kubra TV Mast	El-Mahalla el-Kubra, Egypt	323	
Al Jamiliyah TV Mast	Dukhan, Qatar	322	
Burj Al Arab	(United Arab Emirates) Dubai, UAE	321	
Bakriya TV Mast	Baghdad, Iraq	319	
Husaibah TV Mast	Ramadi, Iraq	318	
HHHR Tower	(United Arab Emirates) Dubai, UAE	318	
Ocean Heights	(United Arab Emirates) Dubai, UAE	310	
Emirates Tower Two	(United Arab Emirates) Dubai, UAE	309	
Beyond Office Tower	Givatayim, Israel	308	
Al Jarf TV Mast	(United Arab Emirates) Dubai, UAE	308	
Cayan Tower	(United Arab Emirates) Dubai, UAE	307	
Etihad Towers T2	(United Arab Emirates) Abu Dhabi, UAE	305	
ToHa2	Tel Aviv, Israel	303	
Kingdom Centre	Riyadh, Saudi Arabia	302	
Address Downtown	(United Arab Emirates) Dubai, UAE	302	
Lusail Plaza Towers	Lusail, Qatar	301	
Address Beach Resort	(United Arab Emirates) Dubai, UAE	301	
Mount Qarrah Chouk TV Mast	Al-Qamishli, Syria	300	
Arraya Tower	Kuwait City, Kuwait	300	
Chimney of Orot Rabin	Hadera, Israel	300	
Aspire Tower	Doha, Qatar	300	
Failaka TV Mast	Failaka, Kuwait	299	
Emirates Crown	(United Arab Emirates) Dubai, UAE	296	
Forte Towers 1	(United Arab Emirates) Dubai, UAE	295	
Khalid Al Attar Tower 2	(United Arab Emirates) Dubai, UAE	294	
Sky Tower	(United Arab Emirates) Abu Dhabi, UAE	292	
Opera Grand	(United Arab Emirates) Dubai, UAE	288	
Millennium Tower	(United Arab Emirates) Dubai, UAE	285	
Sulafa Tower	(United Arab Emirates) Dubai, UAE	285	
Skyland İstanbul	Istanbul, Turkey	284	
Marina Pinnacle	(United Arab Emirates) Dubai, UAE	280	
Boulevard Point	(United Arab Emirates) Dubai, UAE	279	
Etihad Towers T1	(United Arab Emirates) Abu Dhabi, UAE	278	
Zahedan Mediumwave Transmitter	Zahedan, Iran	276	
Four Seasons Hotel Bahrain Bay	Manama, Bahrain	270	
Radisson Royal Hotel Dubai	(United Arab Emirates) Dubai, UAE	269	
21st Century Tower	(United Arab Emirates) Dubai, UAE	269	
Nation Towers Residential Lofts	(United Arab Emirates) Abu Dhabi, UAE	268	
Al-Faisaliah Tower	Riyadh, Saudi Arabia	267	
The Clock Towers -	Mecca, Saudi Arabia	265	
The Clock Towers - Hajar Tower	Mecca, Saudi Arabia	265	
Al Kazim Towers	(United Arab Emirates) Dubai, UAE	265	
Burj Assila	Jeddah, Saudi Arabia	264	
Ubora Towers	(United Arab Emirates) Dubai, UAE	263	
Istanbul Sapphire	Istanbul, Turkey	261	
Etihad Towers T3	(United Arab Emirates) Abu Dhabi, UAE	260	
Vision Tower	(United Arab Emirates) Dubai, UAE	260	
Bahrain Financial Harbour	Manama, Bahrain	260	
Tamkeen Tower	Riyadh, Saudi Arabia	258	
Gol Dasteh Mediumwave Transmitter	Gol Dasteh, Iran	256	
Conrad Hotel	(United Arab Emirates) Dubai, UAE	255	
Dubai Marriott Harbour Hotel & Suites	(United Arab Emirates) Dubai, UAE	254	
Al Fardan Residences	Doha, Qatar	253	
Chelsea Tower	(United Arab Emirates) Dubai, UAE	250	
Rolex Tower	(United Arab Emirates) Dubai, UAE	250	
Al Fattan Marine Towers	(United Arab Emirates) Dubai, UAE	245	
Oasis Beach Tower	(United Arab Emirates) Dubai, UAE	245	
Palm Towers Doha	Doha, Qatar	244	
Azrieli Sarona Tower	Tel Aviv, Israel	238	
Moshe Aviv Tower	Ramat Gan, Israel	235	
Fereshteh Pasargad Hotel	Tehran, Iran	230	Tallest building in Iran
Hi Tower	Givatayim, Israel	227	
Suez Canal overhead powerline crossing	Fifth Shyakha, Egypt	221	
Nimrodi Tower	Bnei Brak, Israel	211	
Saman Faraz Towers	Tehran, Iran	205	
Baghdad Tower	Baghdad, Iraq	204	

== Tallest structures by country ==
Country	Tallest structure
Bahrain	Four Seasons Hotel Bahrain Bay
Egypt	Iconic Tower
Iran	Milad Tower
Iraq	Umm Qasr TV Mast
Israel	Dimona Radar Facility
Jordan	Rotana Hotel Amman
Kuwait	Al Hamra Tower
Lebanon	Sama Beirut
Oman	Sheraton Oman Hotel
Qatar	Lusail Plaza Towers
Saudi Arabia	Mecca Royal Clock Tower
Syria	Mount Qarrah Chouk TV Mast
Turkey	Denizköy VLF transmitter
United Arab Emirates	Burj Khalifa

== See also ==
- List of tallest buildings in the world
- List of tallest buildings in Asia
- List of tallest buildings and structures in the world
- List of tallest structures in the world by country
