= List of tallest towers in Southwest Asia =

The tallest skyscrapers in Southwest Asia are ordered below from tallest to lowest.

== Completed and under construction ==
Milad Tower in Tehran, Iran is the tallest concrete tower in Southwest Asia.

Rank	Tower Name	Year Completed	Country	City	Height
1	Burj Khalifa	2009	UAE	Dubai	828 m
2	Pentominium	2013	UAE	Dubai	618 m
3	Abraj Al Bait Towers	2009	Saudi Arabia	Mecca	601 m
4	Doha Convention Center Tower	2012	Qatar	Doha	551 m
5	Milad Tower	2007	Iran	Tehran	435 m
6	Princess Tower	2009	UAE	Dubai	414 m
7	Marina 101	2015	UAE	Dubai	425 m
8	Lighthouse Tower	2010	UAE	Dubai	402 m
9	Dimona Radar Facility	2009	Israel	Dimona	402 m
10	23 Marina	2009	UAE	Dubai	395 m
11	Liberation Tower	1996	Kuwait	Kuwait City	372 m
12	Almas Tower	2008	UAE	Dubai	360 m
13	Emirates Office Tower	2000	UAE	Dubai	354 m
14	Rose Tower	2007	UAE	Dubai	333 m
15	Burj Al Arab	1999	UAE	Dubai	321 m
16	Kingdom Centre	2000	Saudi Arabia	Riyadh	311 m
17	The Address Downtown Burj Dubai	2008	UAE	Dubai	306 m
18	Jumeirah Emirates Towers Hotel	2000	UAE	Dubai	305 m
19	Chimney of Orot Rabin	?	Israel	Hadera	300 m
19	Aspire Tower	2006	Qatar	Doha	300 m
19	Tehran Office Tower	2000	Iran	Tehran	300 m
20	Mashhad Tower	2012	Iran	Mashhad	297 m
21	Emirates Crown	2008	UAE	Dubai	296 m
22	Millennium Tower	2006	UAE	Dubai	285 m
23	21st Century Tower	2003	UAE	Dubai	269 m
24	Al Faisaliyah Center	2000	Saudi Arabia	Riyadh	267 m
25	Dual Tower 1	2007	Bahrain	Manama	260 m
26	Dual Tower 2	2007	Bahrain	Manama	260 m
27	The Harbour Hotel & Residence	2007	UAE	Dubai	256 m
28	Chelsea Tower	2005	UAE	Dubai	250 m
29	Angsana Suites Tower	2007	UAE	Dubai	250 m
30	Chimneys of Orot Rabin	?	Israel	Hadera	250 m
31	Al Fattan Marine Towers	2006	UAE	Dubai	245 m
32	Goldis Tower	2010	Iran	Tehran	240 m
