= JW Marriott Marquis Dubai =

Building in Dubai

JW Marriott Marquis Dubai Hotel
- Interactive map of the JW Marriott Marquis Dubai Hotel area
- Former names: Emirates Park Towers Hotel & Spa

General information
- Status: Completed
- Type: Hotel
- Architectural style: Postmodern
- Location: Sheikh Zayed Road, Business Bay; Dubai, United Arab Emirates
- Coordinates: 25.1856°N 55.2566°E
- Construction started: 14 November 2006
- Completed: Tower 1 - 12 November 2012; Tower 2 - 27 February 2013
- Cost: AED1.8 billion US$490 million
- Owner: Emirates Group
- Operator: Marriott International

Height
- Antenna spire: 355.4 m (1,166 ft)
- Roof: 298.1 m (978 ft)
- Top floor: 298.1 m (978 ft)

Technical details
- Floor count: 82
- Floor area: 320,314 m^{2} (3,447,830 sq ft)
- Lifts/elevators: Tower 1 - 14; Tower 2 - 14

Design and construction
- Architect: Archgroup Consultants
- Developer: Emirates Group
- Structural engineer: BG&E
- Main contractor: Brookfield Multiplex

Other information
- Number of rooms: Tower 1 - 804 rooms Tower 2 - 804 rooms

The JW Marriott Marquis Dubai Hotel is the world's 3rd tallest hotel: a 72-storey, 355 m (1,165 ft) twin-tower skyscraper complex in Dubai, United Arab Emirates. The AED1.8 billion complex features a 1,608-room hotel run by Marriott International.

== History ==
This project, owned by the Emirates Group, was originally conceived as a single, 350 m (1,150 ft), 77-storey tower intended to be completed in 2008 and built alongside the Sheikh Zayed Road. However, its design and location had to be changed because of the construction of a creek extension belonging to the Business Bay megaproject. The new twin-tower design was launched at the Arabian Travel Market in Dubai in 2006 with 395 m (1,296 ft) towers.

In May 2009, Emirates Group signed a contract with Marriott International to operate the hotel, which would be under the JW Marriott Marquis brand. The concrete structural frames of both towers topped out in April 2010. In the same time, the developer announced that the first tower would be ready for use by 2011 and the second by 2013 and their height would be 365 m (1,198 ft). The first tower was completed and opened on 12 November 2012 and its final height is 355 m (1,165 ft).

With the first tower open, the hotel comprises 14 food and beverage outlets, rooftop bars, a business center, conference halls and meeting rooms, an extensive banquet hall, a 3,700 m^{2} (40,000 sq ft) spa and health club, as well as retail outlets, a swimming pool, and a gymnasium.

The second tower was completed and opened on 27 February 2013. It has the same height as the first one. With this, the hotel officially surpassed the Rose Rayhaan by Rotana as the world's tallest hotel.

The twin towers have 82 above ground floors and 2 basement floors.

In total, the hotel has 1364 standard guest rooms, 240 suites, 4 "presidential suites", a banquet hall, an auditorium, 18 Shops, 19 restaurants and a spa.

The form is inspired by the date palm. The towers are symmetrically placed on the 7-storey high podium to get views of the Burj Khalifa, Business Bay and the sea. The podium houses all the public areas, restaurants, banquet hall and back of house areas. The entrance lobby is 4 floors high and overlooks the Business Bay. The 1,000 capacity banquet hall has an independent access.

Architect Ashok Korgaonkar, founder and principal architect of Archgroup International Consultants designed the J W Marriott Marquis.

In April 2026, the hotel announced that significant parts of the building would be renovated. This includes its rooms, suites, lounges, and dining facilities. The hotel also stated that they would continue to operate during the upgrade.

== Gallery ==
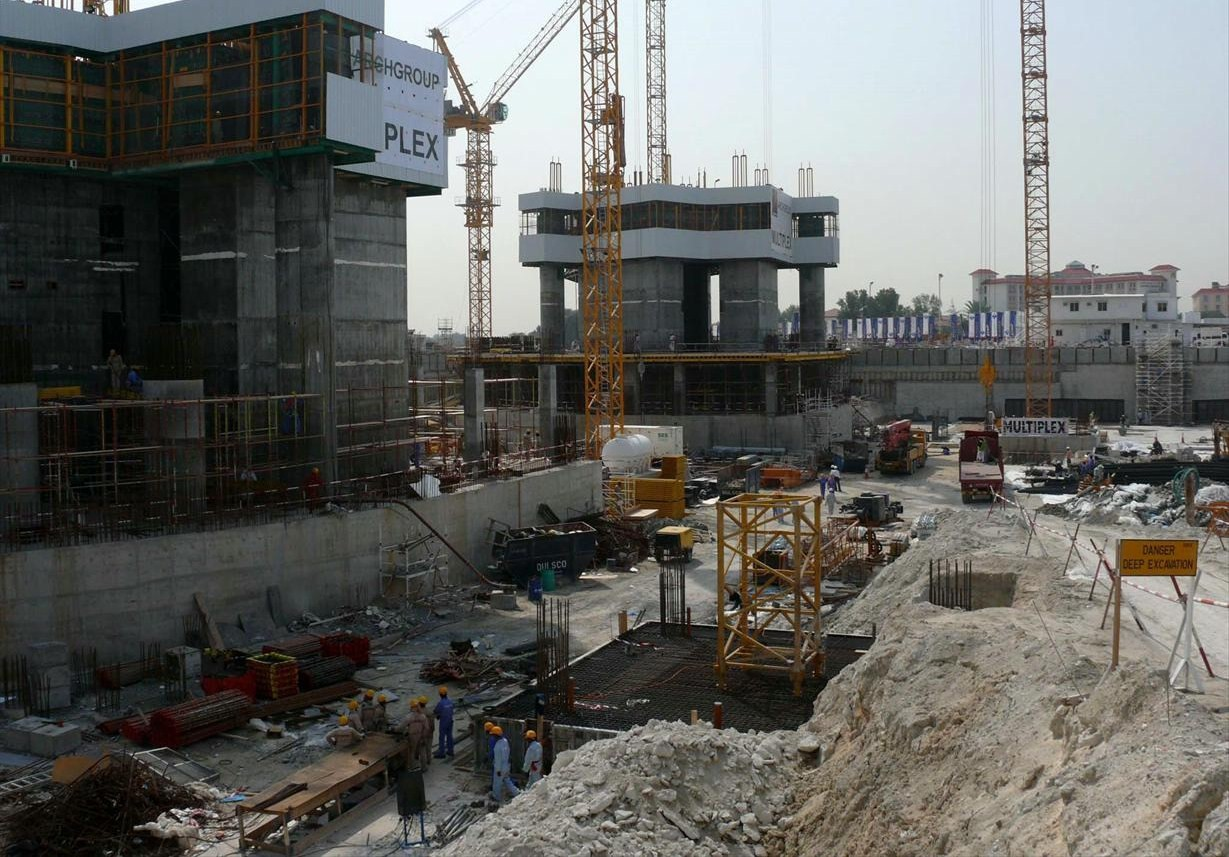
Emirates Park Towers under construction on 31 January 2008

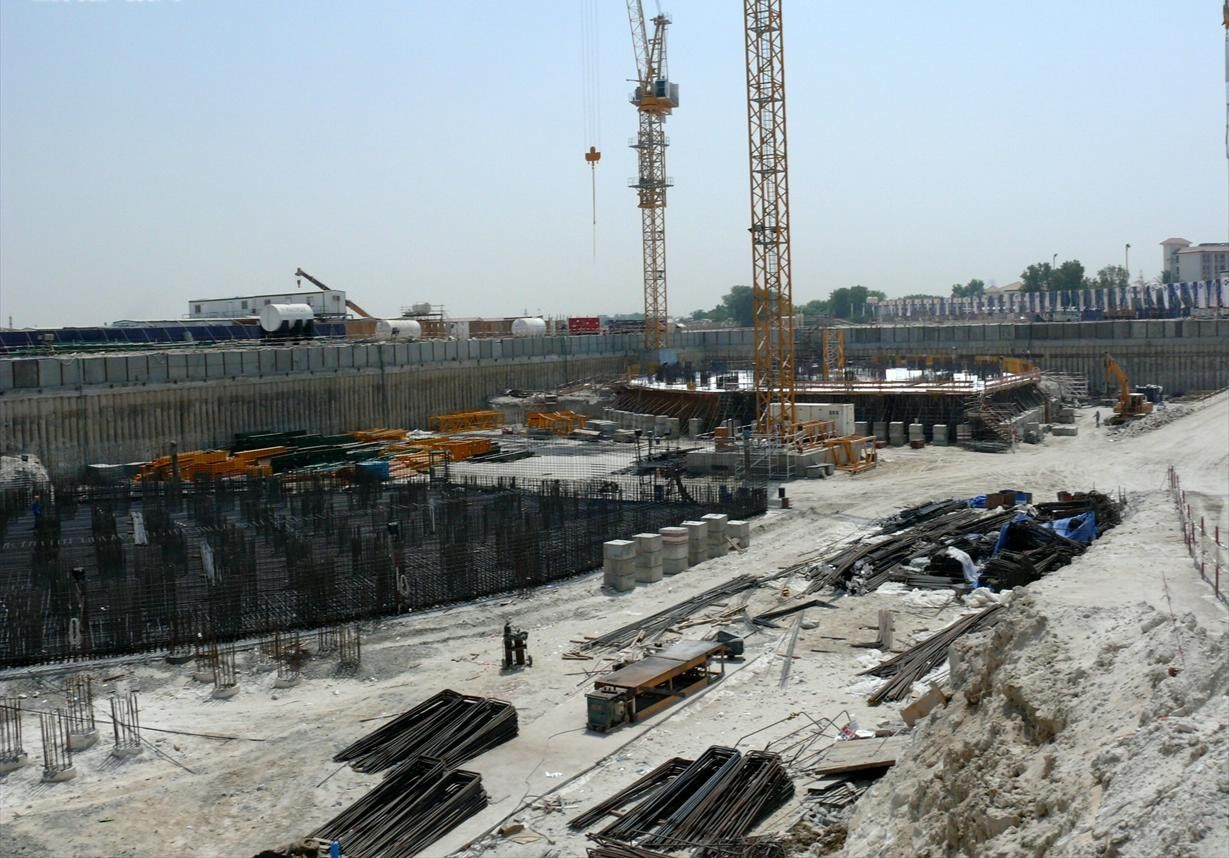
20 September 2007

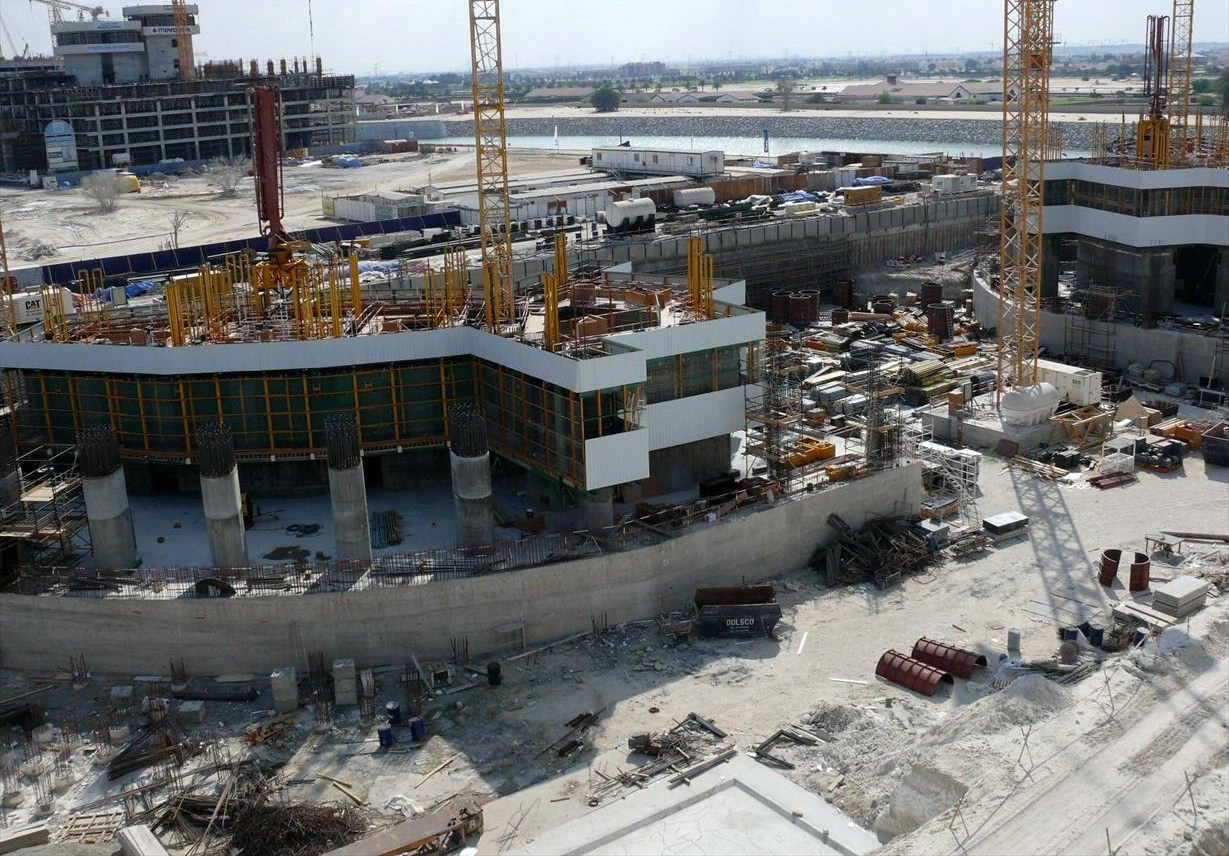
28 December 2007

== See also ==
- List of tallest buildings in Dubai
- List of tallest buildings in the United Arab Emirates
- List of tallest twin buildings and structures in the world
- List of tallest hotels in the world
