= Vue De Lac =

- Interactive map of the Vue De Lac area

General information
- Type: Residential
- Location: Dubai, United Arab Emirates
- Coordinates: 25°04′0″N 55°08′25″E
- Estimated completion: 2011
- Opening: ?

Technical details
- Floor count: Tower 1 - 40; Tower 2 - 45; Tower 3 - 40

Design and construction
- Architect: Gulf Engineering & Consultants
- Developer: Al Attar Properties

Vue De Lac (French for "View of Lake") is a complex of three towers in Jumeirah Lake Towers in Dubai, United Arab Emirates. Two of the towers, Vue De Lac 1 and Vista Del Lago, have 40 floors. Vue De Lac 2 has 45 floors. Completion of the complex was initially promised for September 2007. In 2009, a group of 30 investors filed a case with RERA against delays in construction and changes to design plans. An official from Al Attar Properties responded that the changes were due to regulation changes and that refunds would not be considered. As of 2010, Al Attar Properties started chasing investors for $18.5 million, despite the development still not being completed.

Al Attar Properties has been the subject of extensive lawsuits by the investors. As of 2011, main construction work had still not commenced on the development.

The development featured on an episode of Homes from Hell on ITV1 in July 2010.

Other projects by the same developer include: Global Point, Polaris, Skyscraper, Toronto tower, Vancouver Tower. Toronto and Vancouver tower projects were cancelled by Dubai RERA. - Vue De Lac - Vista De Lago

The Toronto and Vancouver tower projects by Al Attar Properties were cancelled, and land was sold through an auction.

== See also ==
- List of tallest buildings in Dubai
