= Signature Towers =

- Interactive map of the Signature Towers area

General information
- Status: Under Construction
- Type: Mixed use
- Location: Business Bay, Dubai
- Coordinates: 25°11′05.23″N 55°16′03.53″E
- Groundbreaking: 2022
- Construction started: April 6th 2024
- Estimated completion: 2030

Height
- Antenna spire: 350.8 m, 305.2 m, 250.6 m
- Roof: 350.8 m, 305.2 m, 250.6 m
- Top floor: 340.8 m (1,118 ft)

Technical details
- Floor count: 79, 65, 52
- Floor area: 560,000 m^{2} (6,027,790 sq ft)

Design and construction
- Architect: Zaha Hadid
- Developer: Dubai Properties
- Structural engineer: Meinhardt Group

Signature Towers (formerly known as Dancing Towers) was an under construction for a three-tower, mixed-use complex in Dubai, United Arab Emirates. It was designed by Iraqi born architect Zaha Hadid after winning an international design competition which included proposals from OMA and Reiser & Umemoto among others. The developers were Dubai Properties, the company responsible for the earlier Jumeirah Beach Residence. Apart from these three towers, the project would also include a new building to house the Dubai Financial Market, a large podium containing retail space and a pedestrian bridge crossing the creek extension.

== History ==
The project was first unveiled to the public in June 2006 at a Zaha Hadid exhibition in the Guggenheim Museum in New York City. At the time of the launch the name for the project was Dancing Towers; however, this has now been changed to Signature Tower & Dubai Financial Market Development, is started construction on 6 April 2024.

== Gallery ==
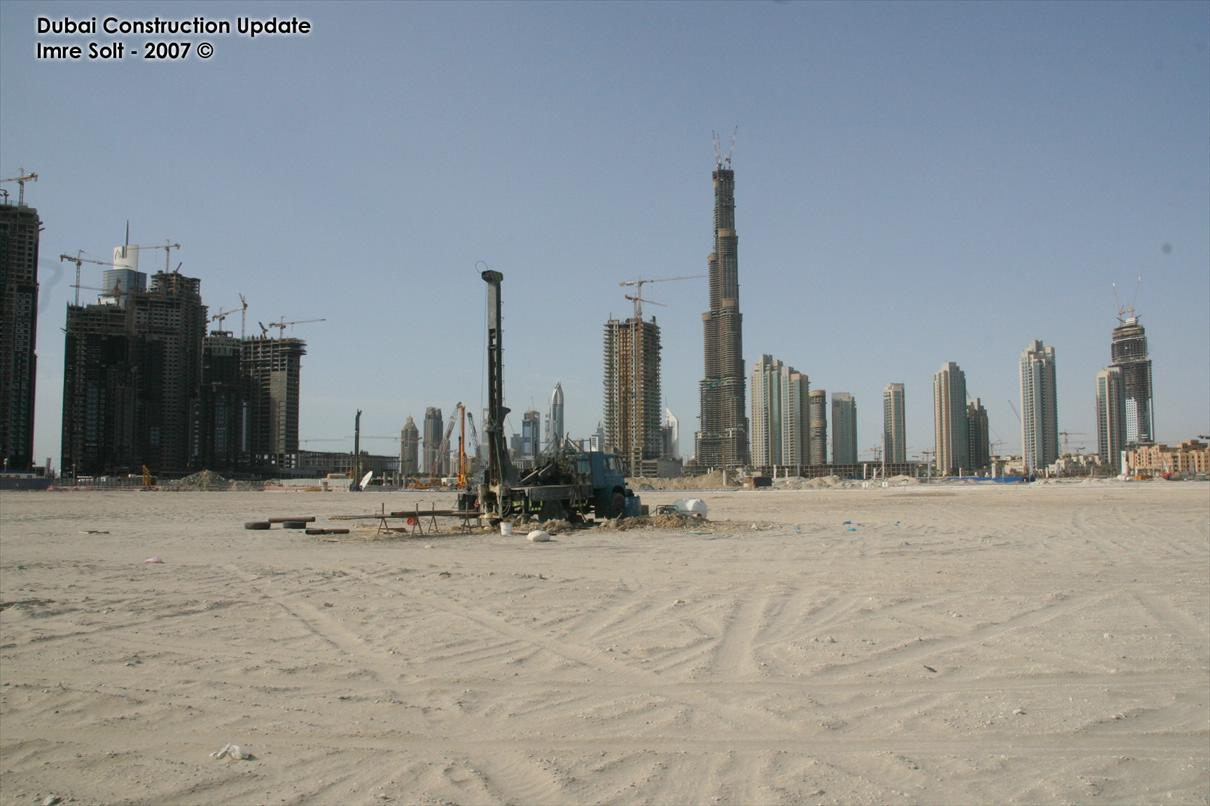
Photo showing soil testing taken on 8 June 2007

== See also ==
- Supertall
- Skyscraper
- Zaha Hadid
- List of tallest buildings in Dubai
- List of tallest buildings designed by women
