= Sama Tower =

Skyscraper in Dubai (United Arab Emirates)

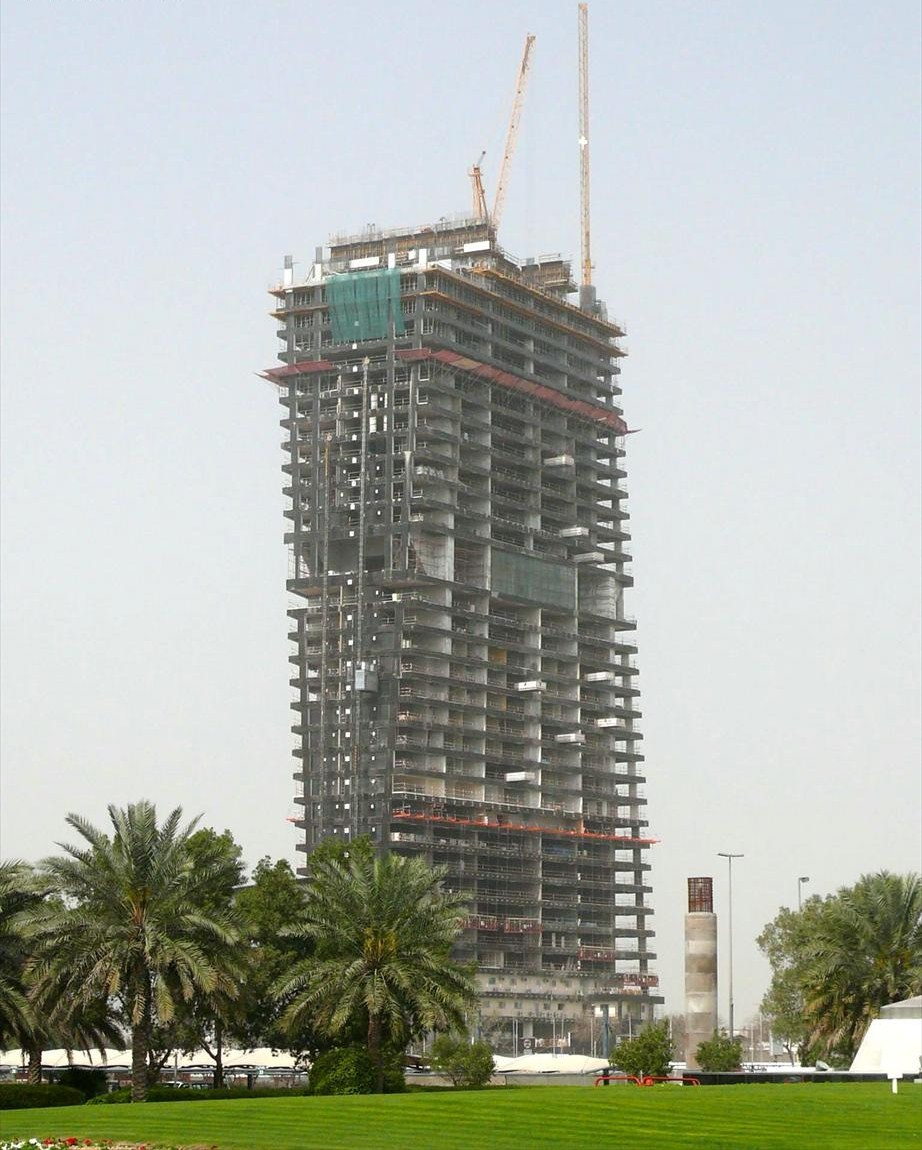
- Sama Tower in March 2008

General information
- Type: Residential
- Coordinates: 25°13′43.04″N 55°17′08.01″E
- Construction started: 2006
- Completed: 2009
- Cost: US$140 million
- Owner: Al Hamid Group

Height
- Roof: 194 m (636 ft)

Technical details
- Floor count: 49

Design and construction
- Architects: WS Atkins & Partners

The Sama Tower (also known as Al Durrah Tower or Al Durrah Tower II) is a skyscraper along Sheikh Zayed Road in Dubai, United Arab Emirates. The tower has 51 floors. Construction began in 2006 and was completed in late 2009.

== History ==
The building was originally proposed as a supertall building named Al Durrah Tower II. The design was a 330 m (1,083 ft) twisting tower with more than 75 storeys for residential use, costing about US$140 million. This design was regarded as a major addition to the Dubai skyline, but at the same time, the height of the project was a concern to Dubai's Department of Civil Aviation. In response to this issue, the project was scaled back to 194 metres (636 ft) with 51 stories.

== Construction ==
Construction of the project began in 2006. The concrete foundation raft for the building was poured about a year later in March 2007 by the Dubai Contracting Company and Ready Mix Beton. Some 10,500 m^{3} (13,700 yd^{3}) of concrete was poured between March 22 and March 23, which set a new construction record for a continuously poured concrete raft. The old pouring record was also held by Ready Mix Beton.

== Gallery ==
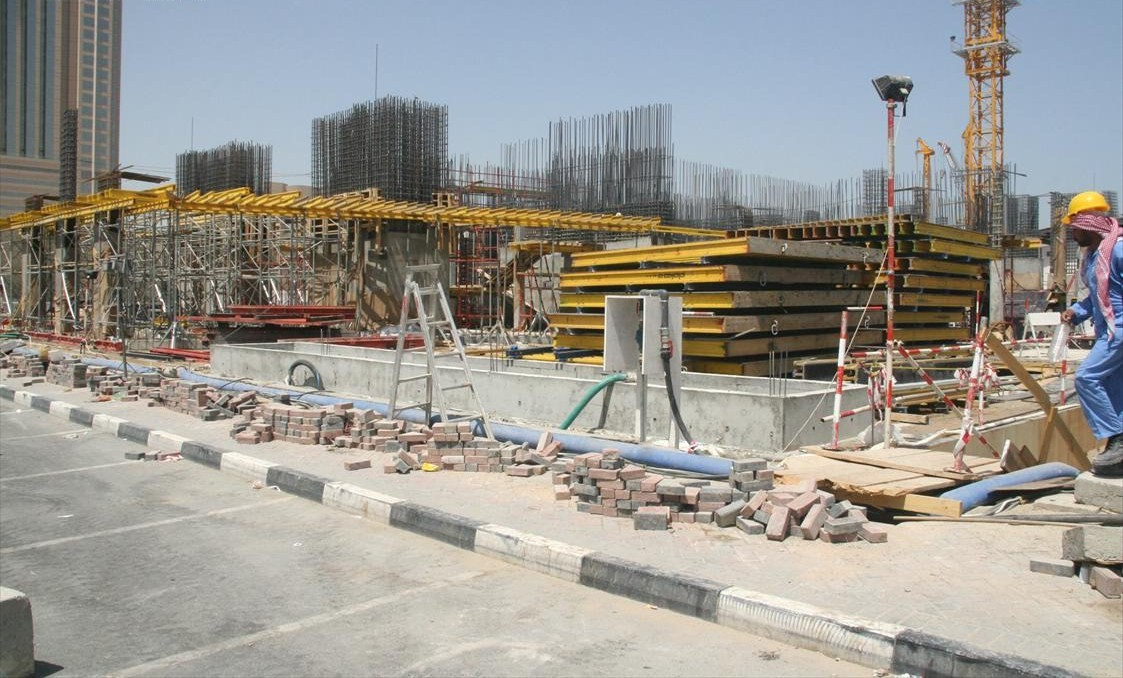
4 May 2007

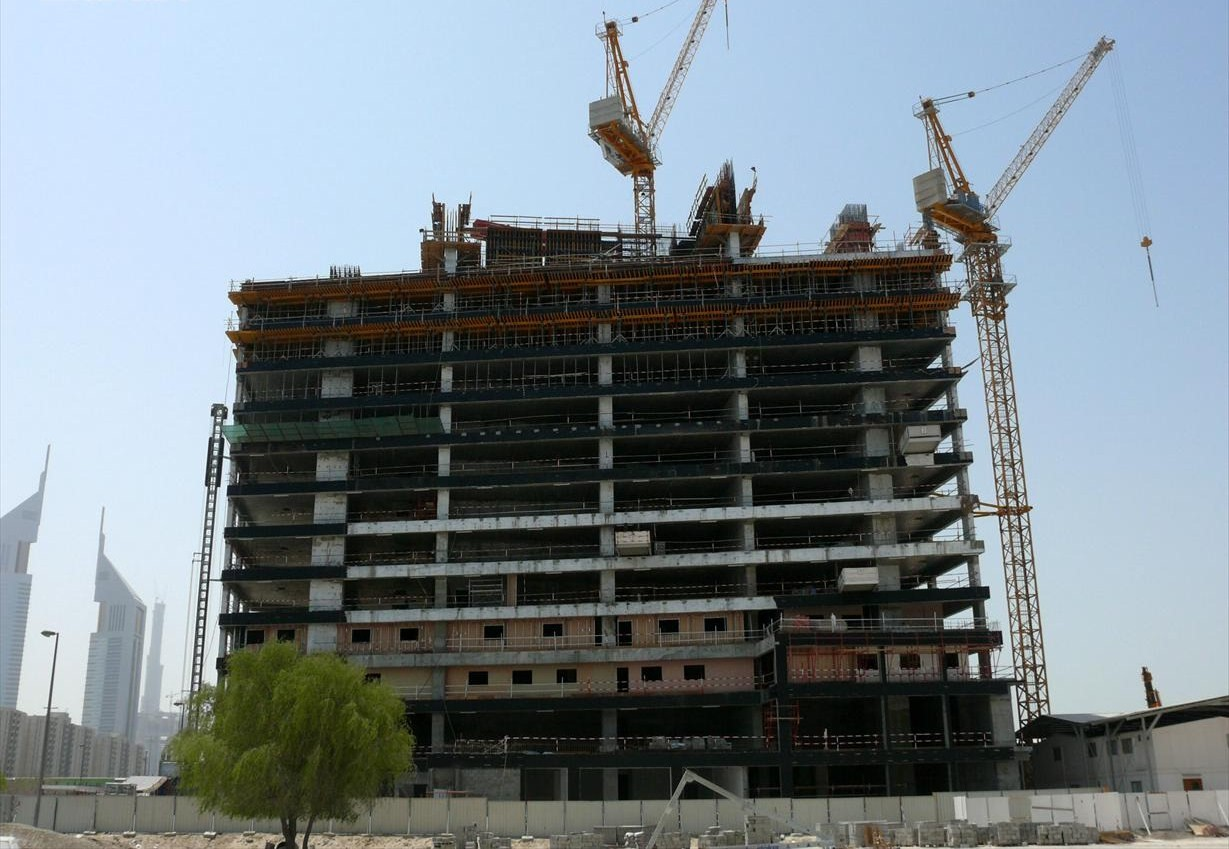
14 September 2007

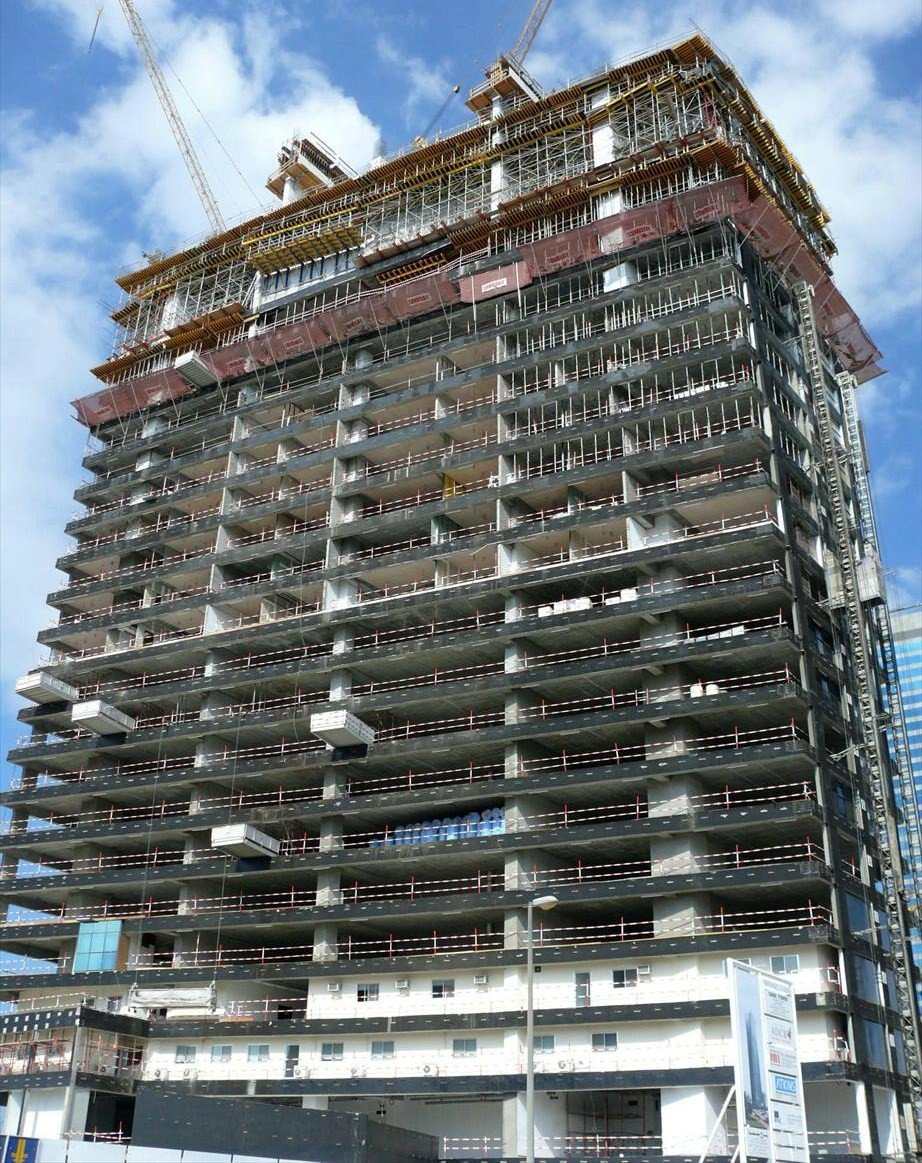
28 December 2007

== See also ==
- List of tallest buildings in Dubai
