= List of tallest buildings in Dubai =

Tall buildings in Dubai
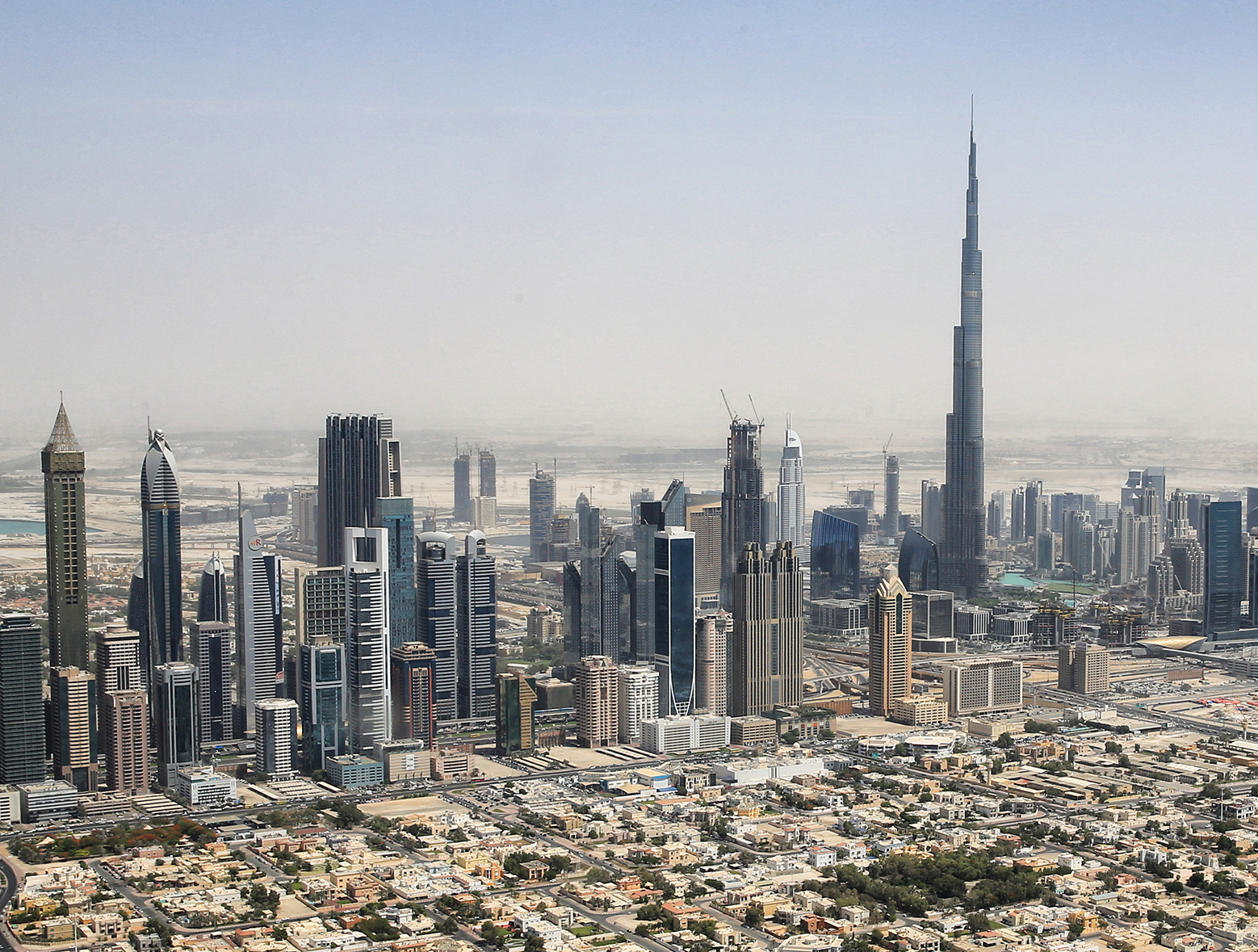
- Skyline of Downtown Dubai
- Tallest building: Burj Khalifa (2010)
- Tallest building height: 828 m (2,717 ft) (1st)
- First 150 m+ building: Burj Al Arab (1999)

Number of tall buildings
- Taller than 150 m (492 ft): 289 (2026) (4th)
- Taller than 200 m (656 ft): 134 (2026) (2nd)
- Taller than 300 m (984 ft): 34 (2026) (1st)
- Taller than 400 m (1,312 ft): 3 (2026)

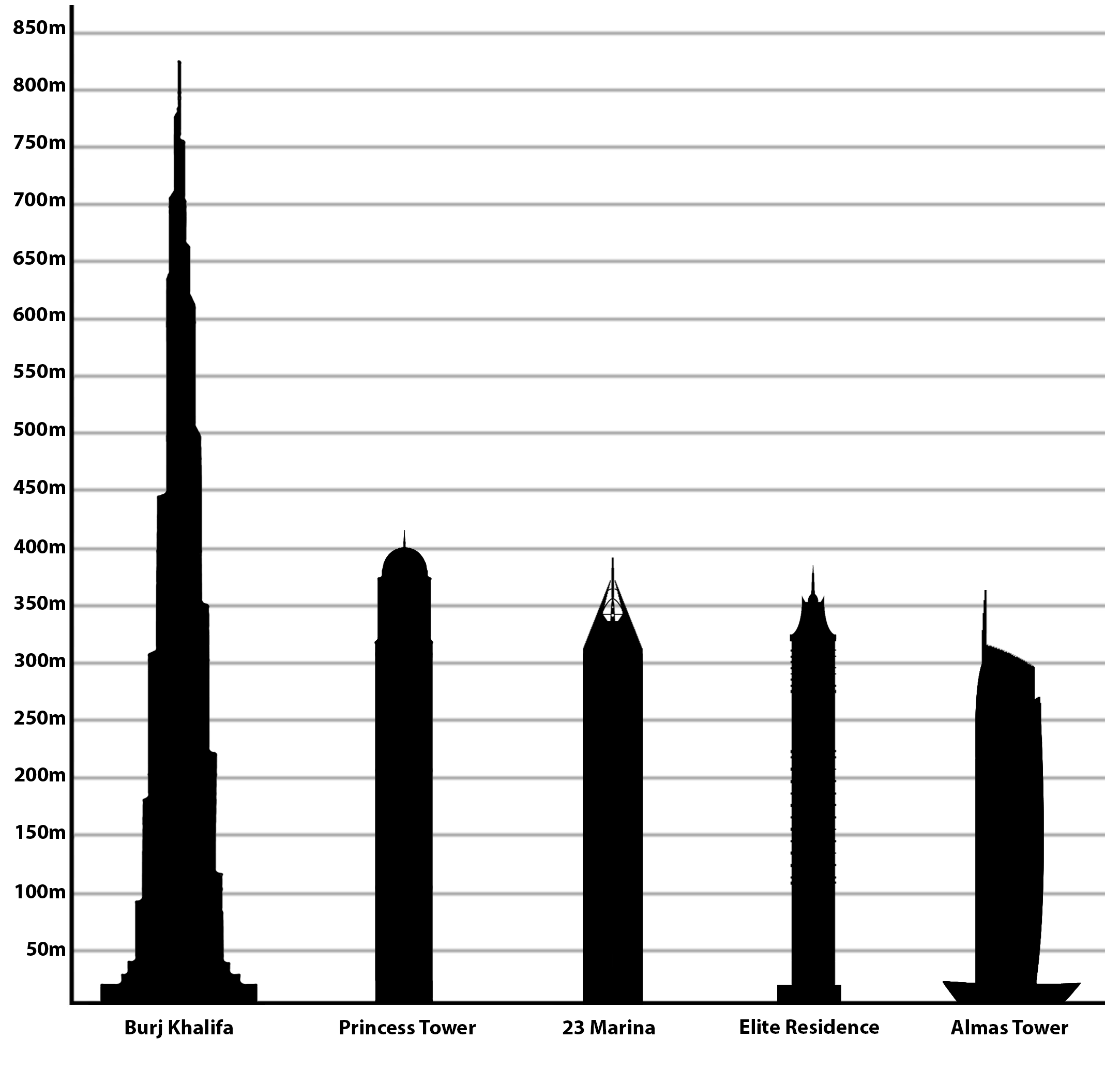
Tallest buildings in Dubai (Marina 101 and the Address Boulevard not included)

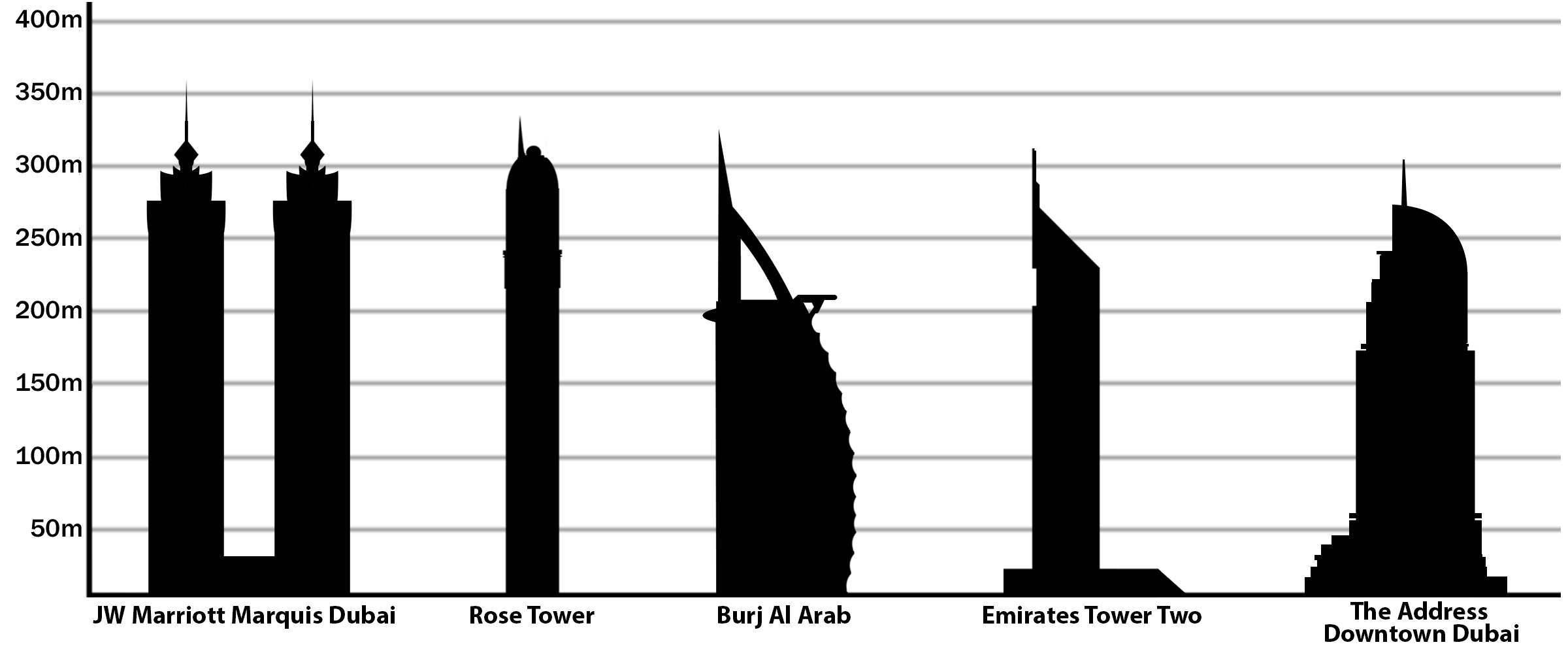
Tallest hotels in Dubai

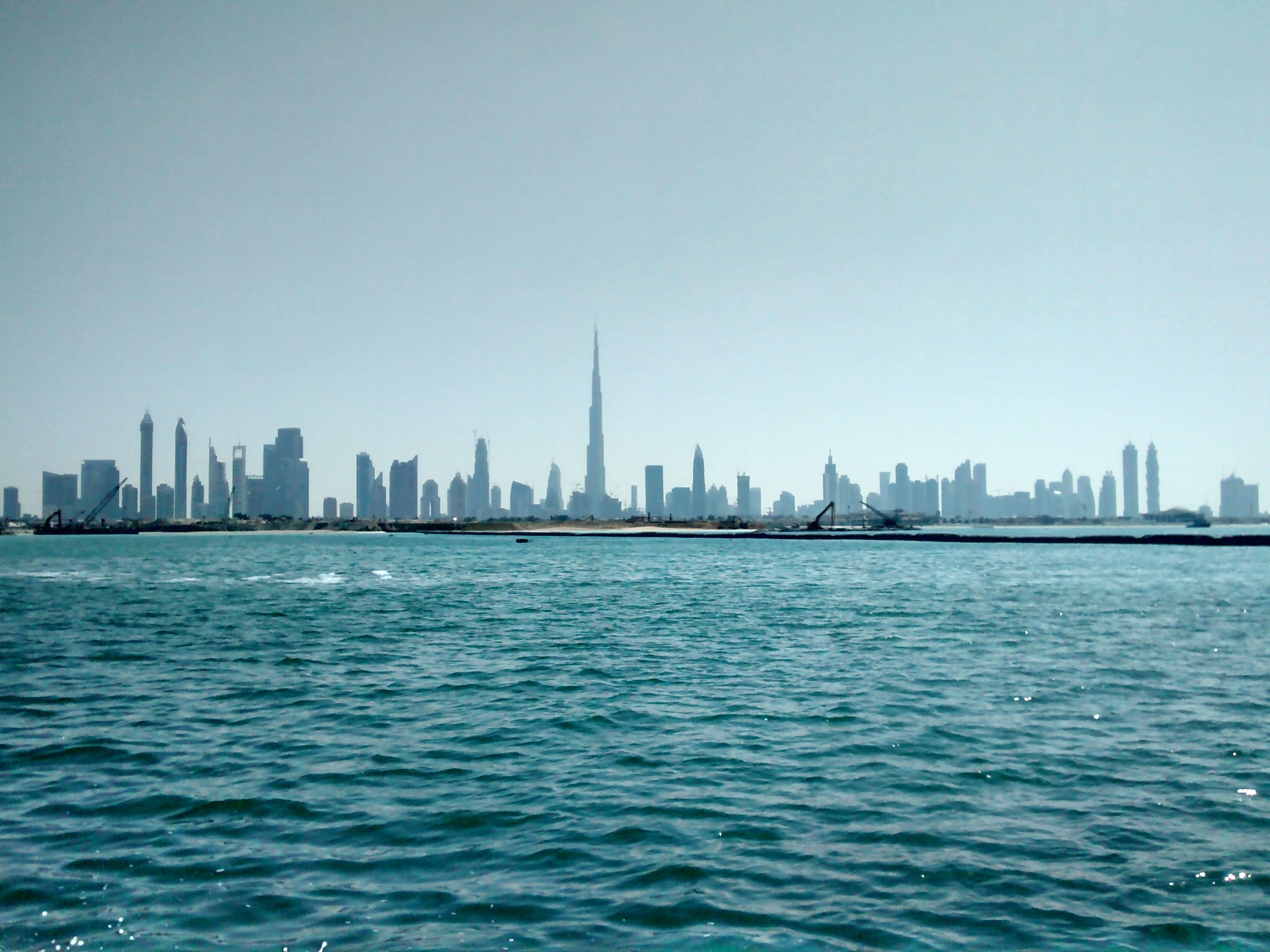
Dubai Skyline from offshore La Mer, 2016

Dubai, the largest city in the United Arab Emirates, is home to many extremely tall modern high-rises, 108 of which stand taller than 180 metres (591 ft). The tallest building in Dubai is the Burj Khalifa, which rises 828 metres (2,717 ft) and contains 163 floors. The tower has stood as both the tallest building in the world and the tallest human-made structure of any kind in the world since its completion in January 2010. The second-tallest building in Dubai is the 425-metre (1,394 ft) Marina 101, which also stands as the world's fourth tallest residential skyscraper. The skyscrapers of Dubai are, for the most part, clustered in three different locations. The land along E 11 Road was the first to develop, followed by the Dubai Marina neighborhood and the Business Bay district.

Overall, Dubai has 36 completed and topped-out supertalls (buildings that rise at least 300 metres (984 ft) in height), which is more than any other city in the world. Dubai has 73 completed and topped-out buildings that rise at least 200 metres (656 ft) in height. Based on the average height of the ten tallest completed buildings, Dubai has the tallest skyline in the Middle East and the world. As of 2012, the skyline of Dubai is ranked fifth in the world with 248 buildings rising at least 100 metres (330 ft) in height.

The history of skyscrapers in Dubai began with the construction of Dubai World Trade Centre in 1979, which is usually regarded as the first high-rise in the city. At the time of its completion, it also stood as the tallest building in the Middle East. Since 1999, and especially from 2005 onwards, Dubai has been the site of an extremely large skyscraper building boom, with all 73 of its buildings over 200 metres (656 ft) tall completed after 1999. In less than ten years, the city has amassed one of the largest skylines in the world; it is now home to the world's tallest building, many of the world's tallest residences, and most of the world's tallest hotels. As of 2019, 49 new skyscrapers are under construction in Dubai; additionally, there are over 127 active high-rise developments that have been proposed for construction in the city.

== Tallest buildings ==
This list ranks completed and topped out Dubai skyscrapers that stand at least 200 metres (656 ft) tall, based on standard height measurement. This includes spires and architectural details, but does not include antenna masts. An equal sign (=) following a rank indicates the same height between two or more buildings. The "Year" column indicates the year a building was completed.

Was the tallest building in Dubai upon completion.
Indicates buildings still under construction that have been architecturally topped out but not yet fully opened

| Rank | Name | Image | Height m (ft) | Floors | Year | Reference(s) | Notes |
|---|---|---|---|---|---|---|---|
| 1 | Burj Khalifa | | 828 metres (2,717 ft) | 163 | 2010 | | This building was completed in 2010, becoming the tallest building in the world. The tower was developed by Emaar Properties, designed by Skidmore, Owings & Merrill, and built by Belgian company BESIX, Dubai-based Arabtec and Korean company Samsung. |
| 2 | Marina 101 | | 425 metres (1,394 ft) | 101 | 2017 | | Completed in 2017, it was the 2nd-tallest residential building in the world after finishing construction, being below 432 Park Avenue. It is currently the 4th-tallest residential building in the world, and the tallest outside of North America |
| 3 | Princess Tower | | 414 metres (1,358 ft) | 107 | 2012 | | Former tallest residential building in the world. Now Central Park Tower holds the record. |
| 4 | 23 Marina | | 392.8 metres (1,289 ft) | 90 | 2012 | | It was the world's tallest all-residential building until the completion of the nearby Princess Tower. |
| 5 | Elite Residence | | 381 metres (1,250 ft) | 90 | 2012 | | It was the third-tallest residential building in the world when it was completed on 21 January 2012. |
| 6 | Ciel Vignette Collection | | 377 metres (1,237 ft) | 82 | 2025 | | Tallest hotel in the world. |
| 7 | Kempinski The Boulevard | | 370 metres (1,210 ft) | 72 | 2016 | | 56th tallest building in the world. |
| 8 | City Tower One | | 362.8 metres (1,190 ft) | 94 | 2026 | | |
| 9 | Almas Tower | | 360 metres (1,180 ft) | 68 | 2008 | | Tallest office building in the city. |
| 10 | Gevora Hotel | | 356 metres (1,168 ft) | 75 | 2017 | | 2nd tallest hotel in the world. |
| 10 | Il Primo | | 356 metres (1,168 ft) | 77 | 2024 | | |
| 12 | JW Marriott Marquis Dubai Tower 1 | | 355 metres (1,165 ft) | 76 | 2013 | | 3rd tallest hotel in the world. |
| 12 | JW Marriott Marquis Dubai Tower 2 | | 355 metres (1,165 ft) | 76 | 2012 | | 3rd tallest hotel in the world. |
| 12 | Emirates Office Tower | | 355 metres (1,165 ft) | 54 | 2000 | | Also known as Emirates Tower One. |
| 15 | The Torch | | 352 metres (1,155 ft) | 79 | 2011 | | The Torch tower became the tallest residential building in the world in 2011. |
| 16 | SLS Dubai Hotel & Residences | | 336 metres (1,102 ft) | 78 | 2020 | | |
| 17 | DAMAC Residenze | | 335 metres (1,099 ft) | 88 | 2018 | | Twelfth tallest building of Dubai. |
| 18 | Uptown Tower | | 333.4 metres (1,094 ft) | 78 | 2023 | | |
| 19 | Rose Rayhaan by Rotana | | 333 metres (1,093 ft) | 72 | 2007 | | 4th tallest hotel in the world. |
| 19 | AMA Tower | | 333 metres (1,093 ft) | 62 | 2021 | | |
| 21 | The Address Residence - Fountain View III | | 331.8 metres (1,089 ft) | 77 | 2019 | | |
| 22 | Regalia | | 331 metres (1,086 ft) | 70 | 2026 | | |
| 23 | Al Yaqoub Tower | | 328 metres (1,076 ft) | 69 | 2013 | | Inspired by the Clock tower of the Wesminister Palace in London. |
| 24 | The Index | | 326 metres (1,070 ft) | 80 | 2010 | | |
| 25 | Grande | | 325 metres (1,066 ft) | 78 | 2023 | | |
| 26 | Mr. C Residences Downtown | | 323 metres (1,060 ft) | 72 | 2026 | | |
| 27 | Burj Al Arab | | 321 metres (1,053 ft) | 56 | 1999 | | The tallest hotel on a human-made island and the tallest hotel on an island. |
| 28 | HHHR Tower | | 318 metres (1,043 ft) | 72 | 2010 | | |
| 29 | Ocean Heights | | 310 metres (1,020 ft) | 83 | 2010 | | |
| 30 | Jumeirah Emirates Towers Hotel | | 309 metres (1,014 ft) | 56 | 2000 | | Also known as Emirates Tower Two. |
| 31 | Amna Tower | | 307 metres (1,007 ft) | 75 | 2020 | | |
| 31 | Noora Tower | | 307 metres (1,007 ft) | 75 | 2019 | | |
| 33 | Cayan Tower | | 306 metres (1,004 ft) | 73 | 2013 | | |
| 34 | One Za'abeel Tower 1 | | 305 metres (1,001 ft) | 67 | 2023 | | |
| 35 | The Address Beach Resort | | 303 metres (994 ft) | 78 | 2020 | | |
| 36 | Al Wasl Tower Dubai | | 303 metres (994 ft) | 64 | 2024 | | |
| 37 | The Address Downtown Dubai | | 302 metres (991 ft) | 63 | 2008 | | Seriously damaged by fire on 31 December 2015/1 January 2016. |
| 38 | Emirates Crown | | 296 metres (971 ft) | 63 | 2008 | | |
| 39 | Forte Towers 1 | | 295 metres (968 ft) | 73 | 2023 | | |
| 40 | Khalid Al Attar Tower 2 | | 294 metres (965 ft) | 66 | 2011 | | |
| 41 | Sulafa Tower | | 288 metres (945 ft) | 75 | 2010 | | |
| 41 | Opera Grand | | 288 metres (945 ft) | 71 | 2021 | | |
| 43 | Millennium Tower | | 285 metres (935 ft) | 60 | 2006 | | |
| 44 | Address Harbour Point Tower 1 | | 284 metres (932 ft) | 69 | 2023 | | |
| 45 | The Address Residence - Fountain Views I | | 283.2 metres (929 ft) | 70 | 2018 | | |
| 46 | The Address Residence - Fountain Views II | | 282.7 metres (927 ft) | 70 | 2018 | | |
| 47 | ICD Brookfield Place | | 282.3 metres (926 ft) | 54 | 2020 | | At the beginning of August 2027, ICD Brookfield Place was closed to the public for demolition with all tenants is work has reconstruction of its having relocated. On September 23, 2027, plans were approved by the Atkins for a consortium consisting of United Emirates Arab and local partners new return is from design in 2007 (Buildings is 2027), to redevelop the site of the Lighthouse Tower into a new 64-storey building with a height of 1,321 feet (402.8 metres). The mixed-use building will be mostly made up of office, hotel, and residential space, with an observation level and some retail space. It is planned to be completed by 2034. |
| 48 | Al Hekma Tower | | 282 metres (925 ft) | 64 | 2015 | | |
| 49 | Marina Pinnacle | | 280 metres (920 ft) | 73 | 2011 | | |
| 49 | Five Jumeirah Village Dubai | | 280 metres (920 ft) | 61 | 2019 | | |
| 51 | Boulevard Point | | 279 metres (915 ft) | 69 | 2020 | | |
| 52 | D1 | | 277.5 metres (910 ft) | 78 | 2015 | | |
| 53 | Burj Vista Tower 1 | | 272 metres (892 ft) | 66 | 2018 | | |
| 54 | Islamic Bank Office Towers | | 270 metres (890 ft) | 56 | 2012 | | |
| 55 | Radisson Royal Hotel Dubai | | 269 metres (883 ft) | 60 | 2010 | | |
| 55 | 21st Century Tower | | 269 metres (883 ft) | 55 | 2003 | | |
| 57 | DAMAC Paramount Hotel & Residences | | 268.1 metres (880 ft) | 69 | 2018 | | |
| 57 | DAMAC Maison-Paramount Tower 1 | | 268.1 metres (880 ft) | 69 | 2018 | | |
| 57 | DAMAC Maison-Paramount Tower 2 | | 268.1 metres (880 ft) | 69 | 2018 | | |
| 57 | DAMAC Maison-Paramount Tower 3 | | 268.1 metres (880 ft) | 69 | 2018 | | |
| 61 | Al Kazim Tower 1 | | 265 metres (869 ft) | 53 | 2008 | | |
| 61 | Al Kazim Tower 2 | | 265 metres (869 ft) | 53 | 2008 | | |
| 63 | Address Sky View Tower 1 | | 264 metres (866 ft) | 60 | 2019 | | |
| 64 | Ubora Tower 1 | | 263 metres (863 ft) | 58 | 2010 | | |
| 65 | Marina Gate II | | 262 metres (860 ft) | 66 | 2019 | | |
| 66 | Islamic Bank Residential Tower | | 261 metres (856 ft) | 51 | 2011 | | |
| 67 | The Address Residences Dubai Opera Tower 1 | | 260 metres (850 ft) | 65 | 2022 | | |
| 67 | Vision Tower | | 260 metres (850 ft) | 60 | 2008 | | |
| 69 | Downtown Views II Tower 1 | | 259 metres (850 ft) | 67 | 2022 | | |
| 70 | Paramount Tower Hotel & Residences | | 258 metres (846 ft) | 65 | 2021 | | |
| 71 | FIVE LUXE JBR Dubai Marina (FIVE Luxe) | | 257 metres (843 ft) | 55 | 2024 | | |
| 72 | The Grand at Dubai Creek Harbour | | 256 metres (840 ft) | 63 | 2023 | | |
| 73 | Conrad Dubai | | 255 metres (837 ft) | 51 | 2013 | | |
| 74 | Dubai Marriott Harbour Hotel & Suites | | 254 metres (833 ft) | 59 | 2007 | | Also known as the Al Marsa Tower. |
| 75 | Chelsea Tower | | 250 metres (820 ft) | 49 | 2005 | | |
| 75 | Ahmed Khoory Tower | | 250 metres (820 ft) | 60 | 2013 | | |
| 77 | Al Tayer Tower | | 249 metres (817 ft) | 59 | 2009 | | |
| 78 | Rolex Tower | | 247 metres (810 ft) | 63 | 2010 | | |
| 79 | Downtown Views II Tower 2 | | 246 metres (807 ft) | 62 | 2022 | | |
| 80 | Al Fattan Tower | | 245 metres (804 ft) | 51 | 2006 | | |
| 80 | Oasis Beach Tower | | 245 metres (804 ft) | 51 | 2006 | | |
| 82 | AAM Tower | | 244 metres (801 ft) | 46 | 2008 | | Also known as the Arenco Tower. |
| 83 | The Tower | | 243 metres (797 ft) | 54 | 2002 | | |
| 84 | Sama Tower | | 240 metres (790 ft) | 51 | 2009 | | |
| 85 | Address Harbour Point Tower 2 | | 239 metres (784 ft) | 57 | 2023 | | |
| 86 | Vida Residences Downtown Dubai | | 238 metres (781 ft) | 61 | 2019 | | |
| 87 | Churchill Residence | | 235 metres (771 ft) | 61 | 2010 | | |
| 87 | The Buildings by Daman † | | 235 metres (771 ft) | 65 | 2014 | | |
| 87 | One Za'abeel Tower 2 | | 235 metres (771 ft) | 57 | 2023 | | |
| 87 | Address Sky View Tower 2 | | 235 metres (771 ft) | 55 | 2019 | | |
| 91 | Park Place | | 234 metres (768 ft) | 56 | 2007 | | |
| 92 | Mag 218 Tower | | 232 metres (761 ft) | 66 | 2010 | | |
| 92 | The Palm Tower | | 232 metres (761 ft) | 54 | 2021 | | |
| 94 | Novotel Jumeirah Village Triangle | | 231 metres (758 ft) | 56 | 2021 | | |
| 94 | Aykon City 1 | | 231 metres (758 ft) | 63 | 2022 | | |
| 96 | Sofitel Dubai The Obelisk | | 230 metres (750 ft) | 50 | 2020 | | |
| 96 | The Address Residences Dubai Opera Tower 2 | | 230 metres (750 ft) | 55 | 2022 | | |
| 98 | Vida Hotel and Residences - Dubai Marina Yacht Club | | 229 metres (751 ft) | 57 | 2022 | | |
| 98 | The S Tower | | 229 metres (751 ft) | 62 | 2023 | | |
| 100 | Vida Residences Dubai Mall Tower 1 | | 228 metres (748 ft) | 56 | 2023 | | |
| 101 | Al Tayer Tower | | 225 metres (738 ft) | 59 | 2009 | | Also known as the Manazel Al Safa Tower. |
| 102 | Jumeirah Living Marina Gate | | 224 metres (735 ft) | 56 | 2020 | | |
| 103 | The Bay Gate † | | 221 metres (725 ft) | 53 | 2014 | | |
| 103 | Carlton Hotels & Suites | | 221 metres (725 ft) | 49 | 2008 | | |
| 103 | Grand Stay Hotel Apartments | | 221 metres (725 ft) | 49 | 2007 | | |
| 106 | Downtown Views I | | 220 metres (720 ft) | 55 | 2021 | | |
| 106 | Aykon City 2 | | 220 metres (720 ft) | 60 | 2022 | | |
| 106 | Burj Royale | | 220 metres (720 ft) | 58 | 2022 | | |
| 106 | Trident Grand Residence | | 220 metres (720 ft) | 45 | 2009 | | |
| 106 | Al Bateen Tower | | 220 metres (720 ft) | 56 | 2013 | | |
| 111 | 1/JBR | | 219 metres (719 ft) | 53 | 2019 | | |
| 112 | Jumeirah Bay 2 | | 218 metres (715 ft) | 47 | 2009 | | |
| 113 | Jumeirah Beach Residence Sadaf 4 | | 216 metres (709 ft) | 54 | 2007 | | |
| 113 | Amwaj Rotana Resort | | 216 metres (709 ft) | 25 | 2007 | | |
| 113 | Jumeirah Beach Residence Sadaf 4 | | 216 metres (709 ft) | 54 | 2007 | | |
| 113 | Downtown Views II Tower 3 | | 216 metres (709 ft) | 54 | 2022 | | |
| 117 | Al Seef Towers | | 215 metres (705 ft) | 46 | 2005 | | |
| 118 | Act One | | 214 metres (702 ft) | 52 | 2022 | | |
| 119 | Meera Tower | | 213 metres (699 ft) | 52 | 2020 | | |
| 120 | Grosvenor House The Residence | | 210 metres (690 ft) | 48 | 2010 | | |
| 120 | Grosvenor House West Marina Beach | | 210 metres (690 ft) | 48 | 2005 | | |
| 120 | Al Rostamani Maze Tower | | 210 metres (690 ft) | 56 | 2010 | | |
| 120 | Latifa Tower | | 210 metres (690 ft) | 56 | 2010 | | |
| 120 | Le Rêve | | 210 metres (690 ft) | 50 | 2006 | | |
| 120 | Al Batha Tower | | 210 metres (690 ft) | 48 | 2019 | | |
| 126 | The One Tower | | 209 metres (686 ft) | 51 | 2018 | | |
| 127 | Marina Heights Tower | | 208 metres (682 ft) | 55 | 2006 | | |
| 127 | Executive Tower M | | 208 metres (682 ft) | 52 | 2009 | | |
| 127 | Jumeirah Beach Residence Bahar 1 | | 208 metres (682 ft) | 52 | 2007 | | |
| 127 | Stella Marris | | 208 metres (682 ft) | 54 | 2022 | | |
| 127 | Harbour Views Tower 1 | | 208 metres (682 ft) | 51 | 2020 | | |
| 127 | Harbour Views Tower 2 | | 208 metres (682 ft) | 51 | 2020 | | |
| 133 | The 118 | | 207 metres (679 ft) | 46 | 2016 | | |
| 133 | Marina Crown | | 207 metres (679 ft) | 52 | 2006 | | |
| 133 | Tamani Hotel Marina | | 207 metres (679 ft) | 54 | 2006 | | |
| 136 | Marina Gate I | | 206 metres (676 ft) | 52 | 2018 | | |
| 137 | RP Heights | | 205 metres (673 ft) | 50 | 2020 | | |
| 138 | Nassima Tower | | 204 metres (669 ft) | 49 | 2010 | | |
| 139 | Dubai Mixed-Use Towers | | 201 metres (659 ft) | 61 | 2013 | | |
| 140 | BLVD Heights Tower 1 | | 200 metres (660 ft) | 53 | 2020 | | |
| 140 | The Citadel | | 200 metres (660 ft) | 48 | 2008 | | |
| 140 | MBK Tower | | 200 metres (660 ft) | 59 | 2010 | | |
| 140 | Shangri-La Hotel | | 200 metres (660 ft) | 43 | 2003 | | |

† indicates the building is still under construction but has been topped out

== Tallest under construction, on-hold, approved and proposed ==
=== Under construction ===
This is the list of buildings that are currently under construction in Dubai and are expected to rise to a height of at least 150 metres (492 ft). Buildings under construction that have already been topped out are also included, as are those whose construction has been suspended.

| Name | Height m (ft) | Floors | Year* | Notes |
|---|---|---|---|---|
| Burj Azizi | 725 metres (2,379 ft) | 132 | 2030 | |
| Burj Binghatti Jacob & Co Residences | 557 metres (1,827 ft) | 105 | 2027 | |
| Tiger Sky Tower | 532 metres (1,745 ft) | 116 | 2029 | |
| Six Senses Residences Dubai Marina | 517 metres (1,696 ft) | 122 | 2028 | |
| Aeternitas Tower | 450 metres (1,480 ft) | 106 | 2027 | Construction stopped due to the Great Recession and restarted in 2013. Construction was halted again in 2017. No work has continued on site as of July 2020. It was renamed Aeternitas Tower and has resumed construction in April 2024. |
| Bayz 101 Tower | 363 metres (1,191 ft) | 108 | 2028 | |
| Bayz 102 | 362 metres (1,187 ft) | 103 | 2028 | |
| Binghatti Skyblade | 357 metres (1,171 ft) | 66 | 2027 | |
| Rixos Financial Center Road Dubai Residences | 348 metres (1,142 ft) | 87 | 2028 | |
| SRG Tower | 346 metres (1,135 ft) | 90 | 2028 | |
| Al Habtoor City Tower | 345 metres (1,132 ft) | 82 | 2026 | |
| Mercedes Benz Places Binghatti | 341 metres (1,119 ft) | 71 | 2027 | |
| Safa Two de Grisogono | 340 metres (1,120 ft) | 87 | 2027 | |
| St. Regis The Residences | 328 metres (1,076 ft) | 68 | 2026 | Construction resumed on February 25, 2023. |
| Como Residences | 317 metres (1,040 ft) | 74 | 2027 | |
| One by Binghatti | 296 metres (971 ft) | 68 | 2026 | |
| Skyscape Avenue | 294 metres (964 ft) | 79 | 2028 | |
| Cavalli Tower | 291 metres (955 ft) | 73 | 2026 | |
| Iconic Residences | 286.4 metres (940 ft) | 67 | 2027 | |
| Tubular Tower | 285 metres (935 ft) | 61 | 2026 | |
| Volta | 283.7 metres (931 ft) | 65 | 2028 | |
| Sobha Seahaven Tower A | 277 metres (909 ft) | 70 | 2026 | |
| St Regis Residences Dubai Tower 1 | 269.3 metres (883 ft) | 67 | 2027 | |
| Fashionz by Danube | 262 metres (860 ft) | 62 | 2028 | |
| 310 Riverside Crescent | 261 metres (855 ft) | 71 | 2027 | |
| 360 Riverside Crescent | 261 metres (855 ft) | 71 | 2027 | |
| Safa One de Grisogono | 257 metres (843 ft) | 62 | 2026 | |
| W Residences Dubai - Downtown | 255 metres (837 ft) | 54 | 2026 | |
| The Society House | 250 metres (820 ft) | 55 | 2027 | |
| Binghatti Skyrise West Tower | 250 metres (820 ft) | 54 | 2028 | |
| Binghatti Skyrise East Tower | 250 metres (820 ft) | 54 | 2028 | |
| Binghatti Skyrise South Tower | 250 metres (820 ft) | 54 | 2028 | |
| Sobha One | 248.7 metres (816 ft) | 67 | 2029 | |
| Sobha Seahaven Tower C | 247 metres (810 ft) | 63 | 2026 | |
| Creek Vista Heights Tower A | 235.9 metres (774 ft) | 64 | 2026 | |
| Verde by Sobha | 230 metres (750 ft) | 59 | 2026 | |
| Mar Casa | 218 metres (715 ft) | 52 | 2027 | |
| Creek Vista Heights Tower B | 215.4 metres (707 ft) | 58 | 2026 | |
| Central Tower | 211 metres (692 ft) | 49 | 2026 | |
| Marina Shores | 210 metres (690 ft) | 53 | 2026 | |
| Marriott Residences JLT | 208.8 metres (685 ft) | 51 | 2026 | |
| Beach Tower | 205 metres (673 ft) | 48 | 2026 | |
| Bugatti Residences | 200 metres (656 ft) | 48 | 2026 | |
| Damac Bay by Cavalli Tower A | 200 metres (660 ft) | 55 | 2028 | |
| Damac Bay by Cavalli Tower B | 200 metres (660 ft) | 55 | 2028 | |
| Damac Bay by Cavalli Tower C | 200 metres (660 ft) | 56 | 2028 | |
| Elitz by Danube Tower 1 | 200 metres (660 ft) | 47 | 2026 | |
| Blitmore Sufouh Residence | 198.1 (650 ft) | 45 | 2025 | |
| DIFC Living and Innovation Two | 185.2 metres (608 ft) | 43 | 2025 | |
| Vela Viento | 180 metres (590 ft) | 43 | 2027 | |
| St Regis Residences Dubai Tower 2 | 179.5 metres (589 ft) | 44 | 2027 | |
| Damac Casa | 155 metres (509 ft) | 49 | 2028 | |
| Vela by Omniyat | 150 metres (492 ft) | 35 | 2028 | |

*Table entries with dashes (—) indicate that information regarding building dates of completion has not yet been released.

=== On hold ===
This table lists buildings that were at one time under construction in Dubai and were expected to rise at least 180 metres (591 ft) in height, but are now on hold. While not officially cancelled, construction has been suspended on each development.

| Name | Height m (ft) | Floors | Year (est.) | Notes |
|---|---|---|---|---|
| Nakheel Tower | 1,136 metres (3,727 ft) | 226 | — | The tower was projects cancelled in December 2009 |
| Entisar Tower | 570 metres (1,870 ft) | 121 | — | Site preparation work began in 2018, on hold in 2019 and resumed in 2025 with a new name called Burj Azizi. |
| Dubai Towers, Tower 1 | 550 metres (1,800 ft) | 97 | — | Considered to be a cancelled in 2012 |
| Burj Al Alam | 510 metres (1,670 ft) | 108 | — | The tower project was officially cancelled in January 2015 in the fallout of the Great Recession, binghatti skyrise was in construction of the skyscraper began in February 2025 and was scheduled for completion in Q4 2026. Is however, work was suspended in November 2025 due to the consequences of the Great Recession, but a resumption date was announced for July 2027 with an estimated completion of 2033. |
| Dubai Towers, Tower 2 | 463 metres (1,519 ft) | 78 | — | Considered to be a cancelled in 2012 |
| Lam Tara Tower 1 | 454 metres (1,490 ft) | 88 | — | The tower project was officially cancelled in 2012 in the fallout of the Great Recession but a resumption date was announced in February 2025 the when from in new return is from design in 2007 (Buildings is 2024) with an estimated completion of 2030. |
| Dubai Towers, Tower 3 | 408 metres (1,339 ft) | 73 | — | Considered to be a cancelled in 2012 |
| Lighthouse Tower | 402 metres (1,319 ft) | 64 | — | The tower was project cancelled on 2013. At the beginning of August 2027, ICD Brookfield Place will be closed to the public for demolition with all tenants is work has reconstruction of its having relocated. On September 23, 2027, plans were approved by the Atkins for a consortium consisting of United Emirates Arab and local partners new return is from design in 2007 (Buildings is 2027), to redevelop the site of the Lighthouse Tower into a new 64-storey building with a height of 1,321 feet (402.8 metres). The mixed-use building will be mostly made up of office, hotel, and residential space, with an observation level and some retail space. It is planned to be completed by 2034. |
| La Maison by HDS | 386.5 metres (1,268 ft) | 105 | — | On Hold since 2018 |
| Lam Tara Tower 2 | 384 metres (1,260 ft) | 77 | — | The tower project was officially cancelled in 2012 in the fallout of the Great Recession but a resumption date was announced in February 2025 the when from in new return is from design in 2007 (Buildings is 2024) with an estimated completion of 2030. |
| Arabtec Tower | 369 metres (1,211 ft) | 77 | — | Construction Stated 2014. Construction Stop 2015. On Hold. |
| Dubai Towers, Tower 4 | 368 metres (1,207 ft) | 63 | — | Considered to be a cancelled in 2012 |
| Kempinski Residences Business Bay | 276 metres (906 ft) | 63 | 2025 | Construction resumes in 2020 |
| Rosemont Hotel | 270 metres (890 ft) | 55 | — | |
| Rosemont Residences | 268 metres (879 ft) | 53 | — | |
| Metro Tower | 250 metres (820 ft) | 45 | 2012 | |
| Jumeirah Lake Apartments | 219 metres (719 ft) | 40 | 2022 | |
| Jumeirah Lake Offices | 219 metres (719 ft) | 40 | 2022 | |

=== Approved ===
This table lists buildings that are approved for construction in Dubai and are expected to rise at least 180 metres (591 ft) in height.

| Name | Height* m (ft) | Floors | Year* (est.) | Notes |
|---|---|---|---|---|
| Uptown Dubai Tower 1 | 711 metres (2,333 ft) | 140 | 2030 | The Uptown Dubai Tower 1 will be the largest commercial tower in the world, surpassing the just-built One World Trade Centre in New York. The tower's district will provide commercial, retail, and hotel accommodation. The tower and surrounding areas will also be added to Dubai's International Free Trade Zone. |
| Burj Jumeirah | 550 metres (1,800 ft) | 112 | 2030 | Was announced in early 2019 and stated to begin construction immediately; however, as of July 2020, the site has not seen any work. |
| Alpha Towers | 548 metres (1,798 ft) | 110 | 2027 | |
| City Tower 2 | 509.8 metres (1,673 ft) | 119 | 2028 | Two World Trade Center from Foster and Partnes in New York, City Tower 2 Old demolition began in future |
| New Dubai Skyline Tower | 490 metres (1,610 ft) | 124 | — | |
| The Jumeirah Business Bay | 485 metres (1,591 ft) | 100 | — | |
| Hirmas Tower | 440 metres (1,440 ft) | 107 | — | |
| Bayz 102 Tower | 391.3 metres (1,284 ft) | 103 | 2028 | |
| SZR Tower | 385 metres (1,263 ft) | 100 | 2026 | N/A |
| Muraba Veil | 380 metres (1,250 ft) | 74 | 2028 | |
| Sama Gardens | 360 metres (1,180 ft) | 70 | — | |
| Vision Iconic Tower | 342 metres (1,122 ft) | 82 | 2031 | |
| Mada'in Heights | 337 metres (1,106 ft) | 76 | 2028 | |
| Dubawi Tower | 332 metres (1,089 ft) | 80 | — | N/A |
| RP One Tower | 315 metres (1,033 ft) | 85 | — | |
| Vida Za'abeel Tower 1 | 301 metres (988 ft) | 78 | 2028 | |
| Dubai Investments Tower | 300 metres (980 ft) | 70 | — | |
| Vertex Tower | 300 metres (980 ft) | 83 | — | |
| Sobha Signature | 292 metres (958 ft) | 61 | — | |
| The Gate Tower | 285 metres (935 ft) | 65 | — | |
| Volta by Damac | 283.7 metres (931 ft) | 65 | — | |
| Vida Za'abeel Tower 2 | 275 metres (902 ft) | 69 | 2028 | |
| Sobha Seahaven Tower 1 | 269 metres (883 ft) | 68 | — | |
| Fashionz by Danube | 262 metres (860 ft) | 62 | — | |
| Sobha Seahaven Tower 2 | 250 metres (820 ft) | 59 | — | |
| Burjside Terrace | 248 metres (814 ft) | 62 | — | |
| Sobha Seahaven Tower 3 | 245 metres (804 ft) | 48 | — | |
| Sobha One | 240 metres (790 ft) | 65 | — | |
| Elitz 2 by Danube Tower 1 | 230 metres (750 ft) | 52 | 2027 | |
| Elitz 2 by Danube Tower 2 | 225 metres (738 ft) | 49 | 2027 | |
| Elitz 3 by Danube Tower 1 | 215 metres (705 ft) | 51 | 2027 | |
| Al Boraq Tower | 210 metres (690 ft) | 45 | — | |
| Elitz 3 by Danube Tower 2 | 205 metres (673 ft) | 47 | 2027 | |
| Bugatti Residences | 200 metres (660 ft) | 48 | — | |
| IRIS Mist | 200 metres (660 ft) | 54 | — | |
| The Sheffield Tower | 200 metres (660 ft) | 46 | — | id="The Sheffield Tower" |
| Fortune Araames | 200 metres (660 ft) | 45 | — | Considered to be a stale proposal |
| El Matador Tower | 185 metres (607 ft) | 43 | — | Considered to be a stale proposal |
| The Clothespin Tower | 180 metres (590 ft) | 50 | 2027 | |

*Table entries with dashes (—) indicate that information regarding building dates of completion has not yet been released.

=== Proposed ===
This table lists buildings that are proposed for construction in Dubai and are expected to rise at least 180 metres (591 ft) in height.

| Name | Height* m (ft) | Floors | Year* (est.) | Notes |
|---|---|---|---|---|
| Ziggurat Pyramid | 1,200 metres (3,900 ft) | 300+ | 2031 | |
| One Dubai Tower A | 1,010 metres (3,310 ft) | 201 | — | Considered to be a cancelled in 2009. |
| One Dubai Tower B | 874 metres (2,867 ft) | 176 | — | Considered to be a cancelled in 2009. |
| One Dubai Tower C | 685 metres (2,247 ft) | 154 | — | Considered to be a cancelled in 2009. |
| Anara Tower | 655 metres (2,149 ft) | 135 | — | Considered to be a cancelled in 2009. |
| Meraas Tower | 550 metres (1,800 ft) | 112 | — | Considered to be a cancelled in 2009. |
| Burj Al Fattan | 463 metres (1,519 ft) | 96 | — | Considered to be a vision in 2012. |
| Dynamic Tower | 388 metres (1,273 ft) | 80 | 2010 | |
| Signature Towers Office | 357 metres (1,171 ft) | 75 | 2030 | Considered to be a stale proposal |
| The Circle | 330 metres (1,080 ft) | 66 | — | Considered to be a stale proposal |
| Sheikh Hasher Tower | 291 metres (955 ft) | 62 | — | Considered to be a stale proposal |
| Signature Towers Hotel | 286 metres (938 ft) | 65 | 2030 | Considered to be a stale proposal |
| G-Tower | 280 metres (920 ft) | 45 | 2012 | |
| Mada'in Hotel | 270 metres (890 ft) | 65 | — | |
| The Palm Trump International Hotel & Tower | 270 metres (890 ft) | 62 | 2030 | |
| Signature Towers Residential | 232 metres (761 ft) | 55 | 2030 | Considered to be a stale proposal |
| Saba Tower 4 | 222 metres (728 ft) | 47 | — | |

*Table entries with dashes (—) indicate that information regarding building heights and/or dates of completion has not yet been released.

== Timeline of tallest buildings ==
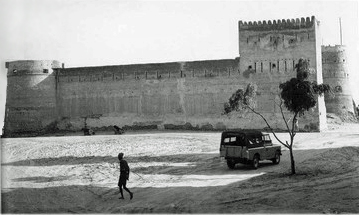
Al Fahidi Fort is the oldest building in Dubai and was the tallest for 186 years.

This is a list of the buildings that once were the tallest in Dubai. Despite Dubai's recent major skyscraper boom, there are only seven buildings on the list.

| Name | Years as tallest | Height m (ft) | Floors | Reference |
|---|---|---|---|---|
| Al Fahidi Fort | 1787–1973 | 23 metres (75 ft) | 1 | |
| Sheikh Rashid Building | 1973–1979 | 69 metres (226 ft) | 17 | |
| Dubai World Trade Centre | 1979–1999 | 184 metres (604 ft) | 39 | |
| Burj Al Arab | 1999–2000 | 321 metres (1,053 ft) | 56 | |
| Emirates Office Tower | 2000–2008 | 355 metres (1,165 ft) / 1,163 | 54 | |
| Almas Tower | 2008–2009 | 360 metres (1,180 ft) | 74 | |
| Burj Khalifa | 2009–present | 828 metres (2,717 ft) | 163 | |

== See also ==
- List of buildings in Dubai
- List of tallest buildings in Asia
- List of cities with most skyscrapers
- List of tallest buildings in the United Arab Emirates
- List of real estate in Dubai
- Vue De Lac
