= Park Place (Dubai) =

Skyscraper in Dubai, United Arab Emirates

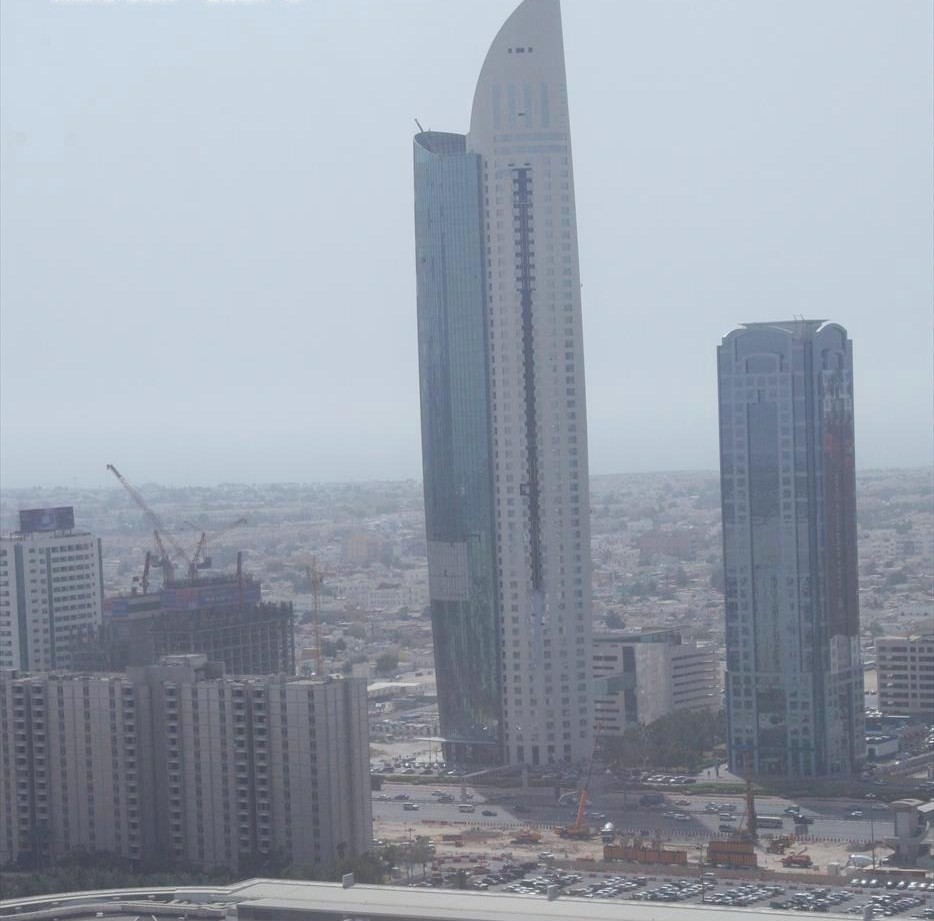
- Park Place on 1 May 2007

- Location within Dubai

General information
- Type: Mixed Use
- Location: 24 Sheik Zayed Road, Dubai, U.A.E.
- Coordinates: 25.2239°N 55.2805°E
- Construction started: 2004
- Completed: 2007
- Owner: Bin Drai Enterprises

Height
- Roof: 234.1 m (768 ft)

Technical details
- Floor count: 56
- Lifts/elevators: 8

Design and construction
- Architect: Cox Group
- Main contractor: Higgs & Hill LLC & Arabian Construction Company Joint Venture

Park Place (Dubai). 2015

Park Place is a 56-floor mixed-use tower on Sheikh Zayed Road in Dubai, United Arab Emirates. The tower has a total structural height of 234.1 m (768 ft), making it the 68th-tallest building in Dubai as of 2022. Construction of Park Place was completed in 2007.

== See also ==
- List of tallest buildings in Dubai
- List of tallest buildings in the United Arab Emirates
