= Sulafa Tower =

General information
- Status: Completed
- Type: Residential
- Location: Dubai, United Arab Emirates
- Coordinates: 25°05′22.21″N 55°08′56.12″E
- Construction started: 2006
- Completed: 2010

Height
- Architectural: 288 m (945 ft)
- Tip: 274.8 m (902 ft)
- Top floor: 274.8 m (902 ft)

Technical details
- Floor count: 76
- Floor area: 107,300 m^{2} (1,155,000 sq ft)
- Lifts/elevators: 9

Design and construction
- Architect: National Engineering Bureau
- Developer: Al Sayyah & Sons Investment Co. LLC
- Structural engineer: Al Asri Engineering Consultant, National Engineering Bureau
- Main contractor: TAV Construction

The Sulafa Tower is a 76-story residential skyscraper in the Dubai Marina in Dubai, United Arab Emirates. It has a total structural height of 288 metres (945 ft) making it the 38th tallest building in Dubai as of 2024.

== History ==
Construction of the Sulafa Tower by Turkish conglomerate TAV Construction started in 2006. The work was carried out at a cost of US$136 million (AED500 million) to a design by Spielman Design Consulting and the National Engineering Bureau, and was completed in 2010.

On the afternoon of 20 July 2016, a fire erupted in the tower, the second fire in a skyscraper in Dubai. (Note: The first fire was in the Marina Torch, which is 79 storeys high, in February 2015.) The original cause was a cigarette dropped by a resident on the 61st floor.

There were several hundred people in the building at the time. The fire extended to more than 30 floors and burning debris was seen crashing to the ground. It took nearly three hours for the fire service to get the fire under control. No injuries were reported by the press. Evacuees were taken to the Mina Seyahi Beach Resort.

The building has attracted attention from thrill-seekers and, in October 2016, a man base jumped from the building.

In response to the fire, in January 2017, the Dubai government announced that it would introduce stronger fire regulations. A subsequent investigation indicated that one of the factors giving rise to the fire spreading at Sulafa Tower, among other high rise buildings in Dubai, was the extensive use of combustible plastic-filled aluminium composite materials. In January 2023, the owners were subsequently asked to replace the cladding.

In November 2022, the owners were concerned by the number of illegal immigrants using apartments in the building. A new management team appointed by the owners, Saga International Owner Association Management Systems, have said that that some tenants are subletting apartments for short-term use thereby allowing the building to be used as a labour camp.

== Gallery ==
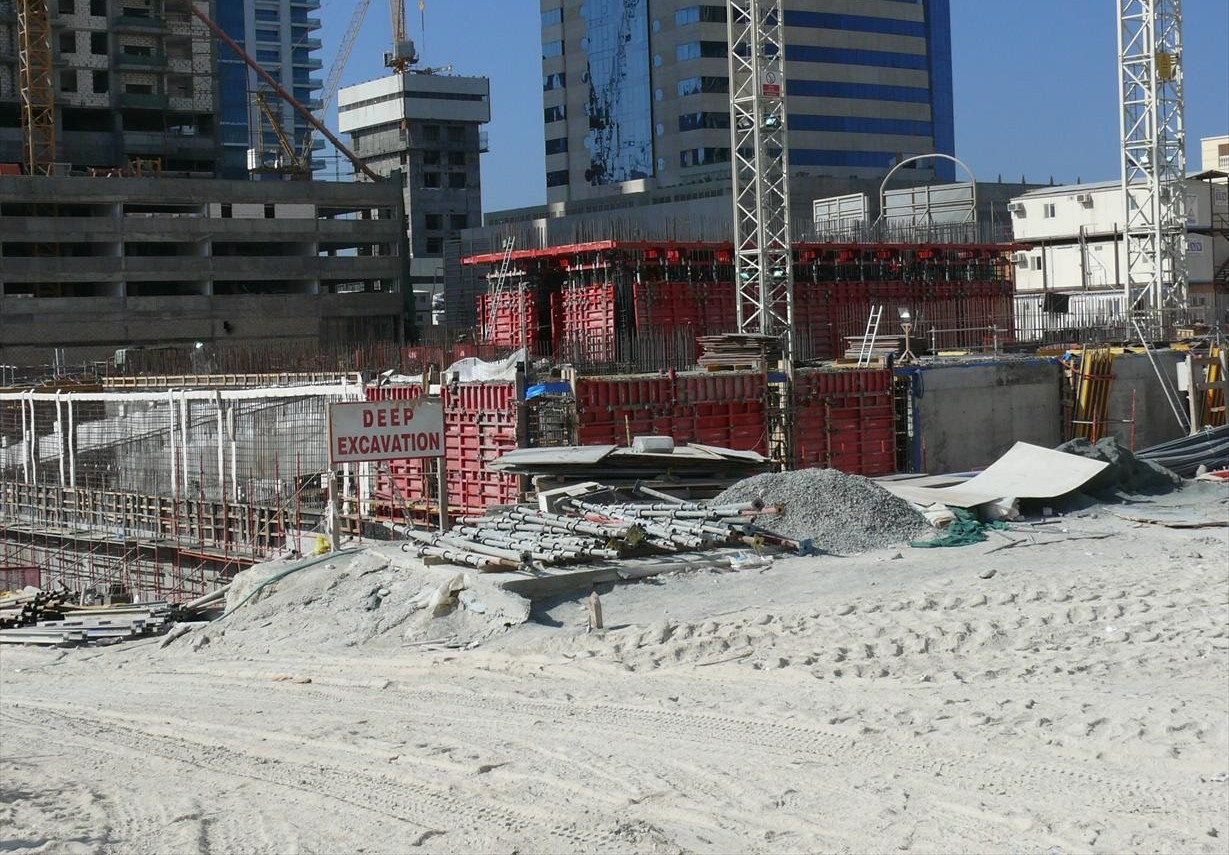
Sulafa Tower under construction in December 2007

== See also ==
- List of tallest buildings in Dubai
- List of tallest buildings in the United Arab Emirates
