= Churchill Residence =

Skyscraper in Dubai, United Arab Emirates

- Interactive map of the Churchill Residence area

General information
- Status: Completed
- Type: Residential
- Location: Dubai, United Arab Emirates, 346-563 Al Amal Street, Business Bay
- Coordinates: 25.18088°N 55.26343°E
- Construction started: 2006
- Completed: 2010

Height
- Roof: 235 m (771 ft)

Technical details
- Structural system: Concrete
- Floor count: 61

Design and construction
- Architects: Design and Architecture Bureau (DAR)
- Developer: Dubai Properties
- Structural engineer: Al Ghurair

The Churchill Residence or Churchill Residency is a residential skyscraper in Dubai, United Arab Emirates. Built between 2006 and 2010, the building stands at 235 m (771 ft) tall with 61 floors and is the current 84th tallest building in Dubai. It is part of a two-building complex, along with the Emirates National Investment building.

== History ==
=== Architecture ===
Created by Design and Architecture Bureau (DAR), the tower is located in the Business Bay district of Dubai. It is part of a mixed-use complex shared with the 42-floor ENI commercial building. Together, they share over 2.5 million square feet of built-up area. The complex has a swimming pool, gym, sauna, tennis and basketball courts, a mini golf course, and a playground. It also provides landscaped plazas provided in the Courtyard. The connecting floor between the two towers is a raised outdoor area known as the Podium, where the majority of the amenities are. The parking lots are underneath the podium, and in the basement levels as well.

The building is situated along the Dubai Canal, which connects the complex to other nearby towers. On the ground floor of the building, there are a number of stores, including restaurants, a bike repair shop, and a hair salon.

Architecturally, the Churchill tower (along with the Al Kazim Towers) resembles New York City's Chrysler Building, and draws upon its Art Deco facade. Together with the ENI tower, they "variety of modernist elements and diverges in two different directions to create two towers with alternating details for the various programs they serve. The towers carry a balanced relationship, one with a façade made of majority glass and one of majority opaque surfaces.".

The ambience of the complex was designed to provide identity for the project and create a highly conducive environment and infrastructure for businesses from around the world that wish to establish their local, regional and international headquarters here at Business Bay.

== See also ==
- List of tallest buildings in Dubai
- List of tallest buildings in the United Arab Emirates
- List of tallest residential buildings in Dubai
