= Opera Grand =

Coordinates: 25.193954675°N 55.271553325°E

- Interactive map of the Opera Grand area

General information
- Status: Completed
- Type: Residential
- Location: Opera District, Downtown Dubai, Dubai, United Arab Emirates
- Construction started: 2017
- Completed: 2021

Height
- Roof: 288 metres (945 ft)

Technical details
- Floor count: 71

Design and construction
- Architect: DP Architects
- Developer: Emaar Properties
- Structural engineer: WME Consultants

Other information
- Number of rooms: 249

Website
- properties.emaar.com/en/properties/opera-grand/

Opera Grand is a skyscraper in Downtown Dubai, Dubai, United Arab Emirates. The developer of the project is Emaar Properties and it is designed by DP Architects. The tower forms part of the new Opera District, its initial plan is for a tower with 65 to 70 floors of which 56 would be residential.

== See also ==
- List of tallest buildings in the United Arab Emirates
- List of tallest buildings in Dubai
- List of tallest residential buildings in Dubai
