= Pentominium =

Supertall skyscraper under construction in Dubai

Six Senses Residences Dubai Marina
- An artist's rendering of Pentominium as originally planned
- Interactive map of the Six Senses Residences Dubai Marina area
- Former names: Pentominium

General information
- Status: Under construction
- Type: Residential
- Architectural style: Postmodern
- Location: Plot No. 392-567; Dubai Marina; Dubai, United Arab Emirates
- Coordinates: 25°05′21″N 55°09′00″E
- Construction started: 26 July 2008; 17 years ago
- Estimated completion: 2028

Height
- Roof: 517 m (1,696 ft)

Technical details
- Floor count: 122

Design and construction
- Architects: Aedas; Woods Bagot
- Developer: Select Group
- Engineer: Hyder Consulting
- Structural engineer: WSP Global
- Main contractor: Arabian Construction Company; China State Construction Engineering

The Pentominium (also known as the Six Senses Residences Dubai Marina) is a 122-storey, 517 m (1,696 ft) supertall skyscraper currently under construction in Dubai, United Arab Emirates. Construction on the tower was halted in August 2011. It was designed by Andrew Bromberg of architects Aedas and funded by Trident International Holdings. The AED 1.46 billion (US$400 million) construction contract was awarded to Arabian Construction Company (ACC).

Construction started on 26 July 2009. Before construction stopped, the building was expected to be completed in 2013. By May 2011, 22 floors had been completed. However, in August 2011, construction stopped after Trident International Holdings fell behind on payments for a US$20.4 million loan following the Great Recession.

After being abandoned for 12 years, in December 2023, Select Group acquired the long-stalled Pentominium Tower. The Pentominium was completely redesigned from the ground up by Woods Bagot, utilizing the already built structure into the new design. In March 2024, the tower was rebranded and renamed Six Senses Residences Dubai Marina.

Upon its completion, Six Senses Residences Dubai Marina will have 122 stories and will be 517 m / 1,696 ft tall making it the tallest building in the Dubai Marina and potentially the tallest residential building in the world. Construction restarted in 2024. It is expected to be completed by 2028.

== See also ==
- List of tallest buildings in Dubai
- List of tallest residential buildings in Dubai
- List of buildings with 100 floors or more
