= Arabian Travel Market =

Travel and tourism event in Dubai

Arabian Travel Market سوق السفر العربي
- Status: Active
- Genre: Exhibitions
- Frequency: Annually
- Venue: Dubai International Convention and Exhibition Centre - Dubai World Trade Centre
- Location: Dubai
- Coordinates: 25°13′32″N 55°17′20″E
- Country: United Arab Emirates
- Inaugurated: 1995
- Most recent: 2025
- Next event: 2026
- Participants: 83 countries
- Area: 25,000 m^{2}
- Organiser: RELX
- Website: Arabian Travel Market

Arabian Travel Market, known as ATM, is a travel and tourism event, organized annually in Dubai to provide a platform for inbound and outbound tourism professionals in the Middle East and gives information on tourism destinations, accommodation options, tourism attractions and aviation industry in the Middle East and around the world. The event is organized by RELX.

== History ==
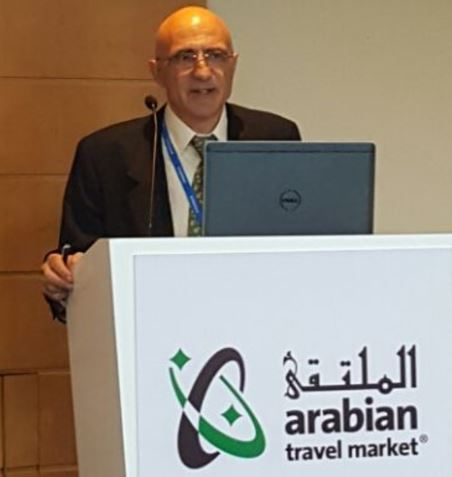
Travel technology provider Amadeus´ Juan Girón - 2022

The event, inaugurated in 1994 and was hosted at Dubai International Convention and Exhibition Centre. The event is aimed at industry and government decision-makers and provides industry news, products and educational content. In 2014, the event attracted 2,700 exhibitors from 83 countries, 68 national pavilions and about 21,000 trade visitors from 157 countries. It covered about 25,000 sq. metres of exhibition space and is widely regarded as the largest international tourism and hospitality event in the region.

The event has been attended by global companies like Google, Mövenpick, both sponsors of the 2013 edition of the event, Emirates, Lazio and Alitalia. It has also featured on the World Tourism Organization UNWTO calendar.

The Arabian Travel Market hosted the first ATM Global Halal Tourism Summit as part of its line-up of special focus event which will feature three interactive seminar sessions covering the big picture, halal destination strategies and how to sell halal travel, led by leading Muslim travel industry experts including Faeez Fadhlillah, Co-Founder & CEO, Salam Standard & Tripfez; Nabeel Shariff, Founder and Director of Serendipity Tailormade and Luxury Halal Travel.

Due to the COVID-19 pandemic, the Arabian Travel Market's organizers announced that the 2020 exhibition, which had originally been scheduled for 19-22 April but had been moved to 28 June-1 July 2020, would be cancelled for 2020.

The event returned to an in-person event in 2021, taking place from 16-19 May 2021 at the Dubai World Trade Centre. The next edition is set to take place from 14-17 September 2026.

== Awards and recognitions ==
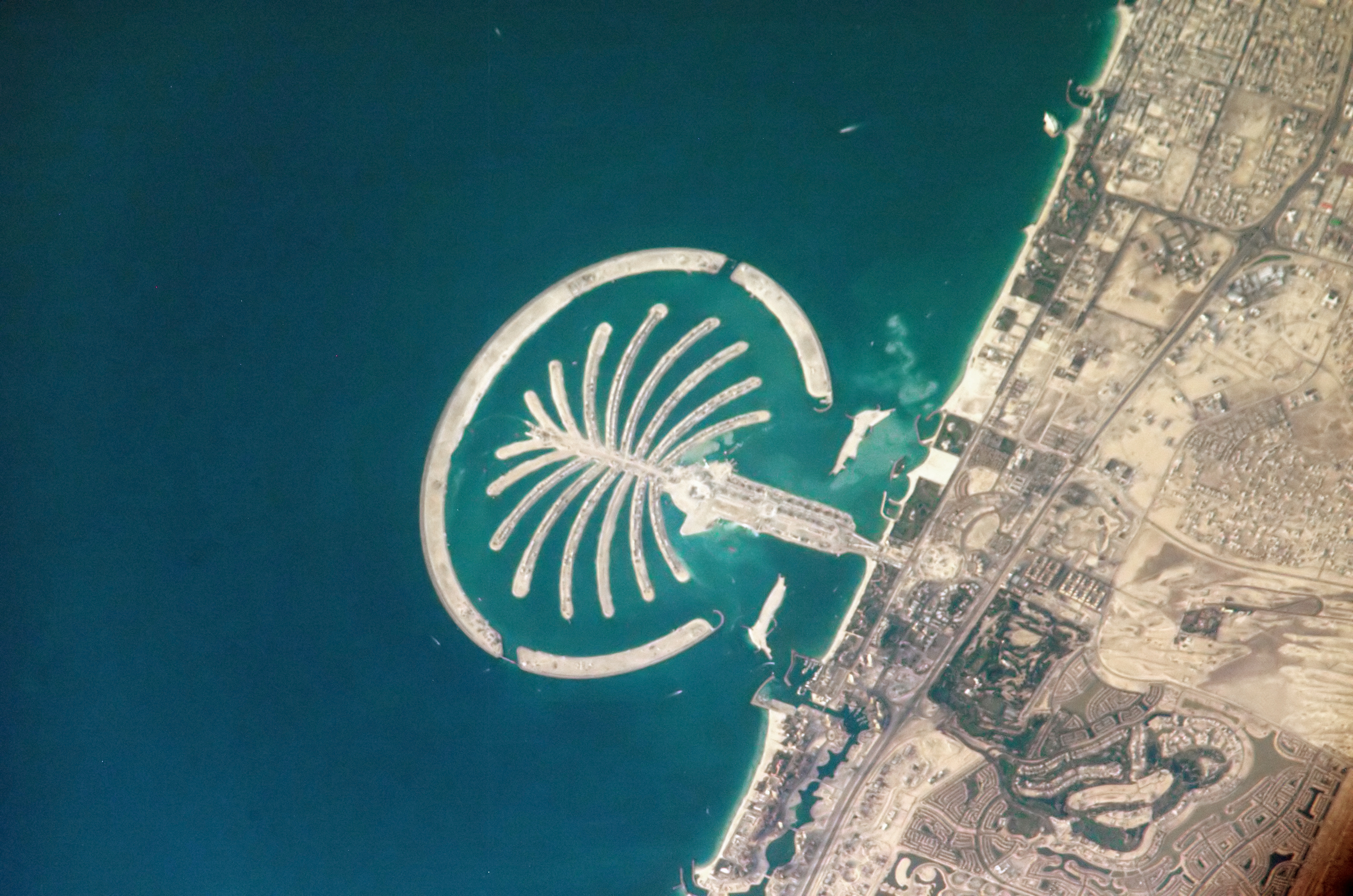
Bird's eye view of Palm Island

ATM won the World Travel Awards, generally considered as the Oscars of the travel industry, for the years, 2009, 2010, 2011 and 2012. It was at the Arabian Travel Market in 2001, the concept of Palm Islands was revealed.

The event recognizes the achievements in the travel and tourism industry by way of Arabian Travel Market awards, distributed annually. It also offers an award, the New Frontier Award, to recognise outstanding contributions to tourism development in the face of overwhelming adversity, supporting the chosen destination by donating exhibition space at the event to the value of US$10,000.
