= Al Kazim Towers =

Business Central Towers

- Location within Dubai

General information
- Type: Mixed Use
- Location: Dubai, United Arab Emirates
- Coordinates: 25°06′00.71″N 55°10′09.47″E
- Construction started: 2005
- Completed: 2008

Height
- Antenna spire: 265 m (869 ft)

Technical details
- Floor count: 53
- Lifts/elevators: 19 (+ 2 escalators)

Design and construction
- Architect: National Engineering Bureau
- Developer: Al Shafar General Contracting Co (L.L.C.)

The Business Central Towers form a complex of two 51-floor towers in Dubai Media City in Dubai, United Arab Emirates. Both towers have an equal total structural height of 265 meters (869 ft) and resemble New York City's Chrysler Building. Both towers were topped out in November 2007 and were completed in early 2008. Originally named the Al Kazim Tower Towers, the towers were renamed as the Business Central Towers, a more friendly name for all foreign companies in both buildings.

== See also ==
- List of tallest buildings in Dubai
- Churchill Residence
