= Elite Residence =

Supertall skyscraper in Dubai, United Arab Emirates in the Dubai Marina district

- Elite Residence in 2020 (yellow building at center)
- Interactive map of the Elite Residence area

General information
- Status: Completed
- Type: Residential
- Location: Dubai, United Arab Emirates
- Coordinates: 25°05′22.45″N 55°08′52.40″E
- Groundbreaking: 10 December 2006
- Construction started: 10 March 2007
- Completed: 21 January 2012
- Opening: 26 August 2012

Height
- Roof: 380.5 metres (1,248 ft).

Technical details
- Floor count: 87
- Floor area: 140,013 m^{2} (1,507,087 sq ft)

Design and construction
- Architect: Adnan Saffarini
- Developer: Tameer Holdings Investment LLC

Ground view of Elite Residence

Elite Residence is a supertall skyscraper in Dubai, United Arab Emirates in the Dubai Marina district, overlooking Palm Jumeirah. The building is 380.5 metres (1,248 ft) tall and has 87 floors. Of the 91 floors, 76 are for 695 apartments and the other 15 include amenities such as car-parking, swimming pools, spas, reception areas, health clubs, a business centre and a gymnasium.

The skyscraper has 695 apartments and 12 elevators.

The tower was the third-tallest residential building in the world when completed on 21 January 2012. As of 2022, it is the eighth-tallest residential building in the world.

== See also ==
- List of tallest buildings in Dubai
- List of tallest buildings in the United Arab Emirates
