= Ubora Towers =

- Ubora Towers in March 2013
- Interactive map of the Ubora Towers area

General information
- Type: Office, Residential
- Location: Dubai, United Arab Emirates
- Coordinates: 25°10′50.08″N 55°16′15.70″E
- Construction started: 2005
- Completed: 2011
- Owner: Senyar Real Estate (an Al Tayer Company)

Height
- Roof: 862 ft (262.7 m) Skyscraper

Technical details
- Floor count: 58

Design and construction
- Architects: Aedas, Andrew Bromberg
- Developer: Bando Engineering & Construction Co. Ltd.
- Structural engineer: Whitby Bird & Partners
- Other designers: Al Burj Engineering Consultants (AOR)

The Ubora Towers is a complex of two towers in the Business Bay district of Dubai, United Arab Emirates. The development consists of the Ubora Commercial Tower and the Ubora Residential Tower. Construction of the Ubora Towers was completed in 2011. It was sold by to Senyar Real Estate in Mid 2018.

The Ubora Commercial Tower, also known as the Ubora Tower 1, is a 58-story building. It has a total architectural height of 263 metres (862 ft). The Ubora Residential Tower, or Ubora Tower 2, is a 20-floor structure. The commercial skyscraper was topped out in 2011. The complex was designed by the architectural firm Aedas, with lighting design by AWA Lighting Designers, and is currently managed by JLL.

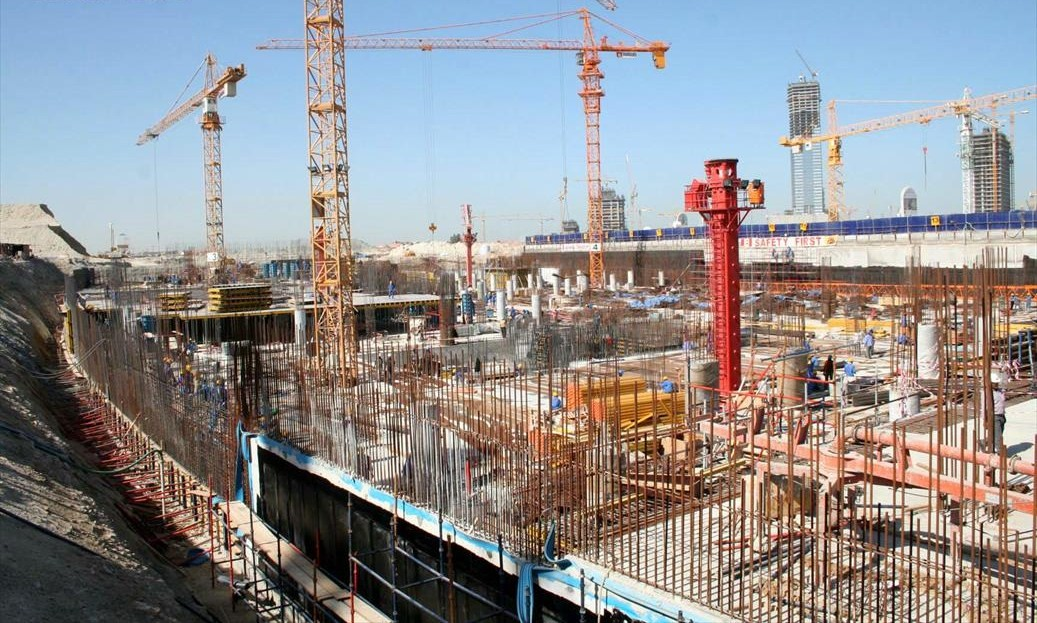
This is a photo showing the construction of the Ubora Towers, located in Business Bay in Dubai, United Arab Emirates, on 11 February, 2008.

There is a public transport bus stop on both sides of the road named as U bora Tower which is where people working in nearby towers use to board and get down. All the buses crossing this tower except buses 26 & 50 lead to the nearest Metro Station which is Business Bay Metro Station.

== See also ==
- List of tallest buildings in Dubai
