= Khalid Al Attar Tower 2 =

Tower in Dubai

General information
- Type: Mixed Use
- Location: Dubai, United Arab Emirates
- Coordinates: 25°13′03.34″N 55°16′42.46″E
- Construction started: 2004
- Completed: 2011

Height
- Architectural: 294 m (965 ft)

Technical details
- Floor count: 66

Design and construction
- Architect: Adnan Z Saffarini
- Developer: Transemirates Contracting LLC

Khalid Al Attar Tower 2, aka The Tower Plaza Hotel Dubai (previously Millennium Plaza Hotel Dubai), is a 66-floor tower on Sheikh Zayed Road in Dubai, United Arab Emirates. The tower has a total structural height of 294 m (853 ft). Construction of the Khalid Al Attar Tower 2 was completed in 2011.

== See also ==
- List of tallest buildings in Dubai
- List of tallest buildings in the United Arab Emirates
