= Marina Pinnacle =

- Marina Pinnacle in 2023
- Interactive map of the Marina Pinnacle area
- Alternative names: Tiger Tower

General information
- Status: Closed due to fire damage
- Type: Residential
- Location: Dubai, United Arab Emirates
- Coordinates: 25°05′19″N 55°08′53″E
- Construction started: 2005
- Completed: 2011
- Owner: Tiger properties

Height
- Roof: 280 m (919 ft)

Technical details
- Floor count: 77
- Floor area: 200 meter

Design and construction
- Developer: Emaar Properties
- Main contractor: Tiger Intl Contracting Co.

The Marina Pinnacle is a 77-floor tower in the Dubai Marina in Dubai, United Arab Emirates. The tower has a total structural height of 280 m (853 ft) and 764 residential and commercial units. Construction of the Marina Pinnacle was completed in 2011.

The tower topped out in December 2010 with 96% completion and became 19th tallest building in Dubai. Handover process is started in July 2011 and it is 100% completed.

In June 2025, a fire broke out on the upper floors but was brought under control within six hours. All 3,820 residents were evacuated safely, and no injuries were reported.

== See also ==
Marina Pinnacle under construction

- List of tallest buildings in Dubai
- List of tallest buildings in the United Arab Emirates
