= Dubai Marriott Harbour Hotel & Suites =

- Interactive map of the Dubai Marriott Harbour Hotel & Suites area

General information
- Location: Dubai, United Arab Emirates
- Coordinates: 25°05′16.27″N 55°08′45.88″E
- Construction started: 2004
- Completed: 2007
- Opening: 1 November 2007
- Cost: 141 million USD
- Management: Marriott International

Height
- Roof: 256 m (840 ft)
- Top floor: 59

Technical details
- Floor count: 59 (2 basement floors)

Design and construction
- Architect: Khatib & Alami Architecture & Planning
- Main contractor: Al Naboodah Contracting (L.L.C.)

Dubai Marriott Harbour Hotel & Suites is a 59-floor 256 metre (840 ft) tall skyscraper completed in 2007. This residential and hotel tower is located in Dubai Marina in Dubai, United Arab Emirates and features 261 suites offering choices of 24 spacious studio rooms, six one-bedroom, 170 two-bedroom and 55 three-bedroom suites, as well as six penthouses. The Hotel is the property of The Emirates Group, which also owns other hotels like Al Maha Desert Resort & Spa.

When opened on 1 November 2007, it was known as Emirates Marina Hotel & Residence. The name was changed to The Harbour Hotel & Residence in January 2008. The reason for the change was due to the large quantity of buildings in Dubai Marina that had the word "Marina" in them. To prevent confusion from their customers, and to keep the nautical theme, the words "Emirates Marina" were changed to "The Harbour." The hotel was finally rebranded and renamed Dubai Marriott Harbour Hotel & Suites, when it was put under the management of Marriott International on 15 September 2009.

== See also ==
- List of tallest buildings in the world
- List of tallest buildings in Dubai
- List of tallest buildings in the United Arab Emirates
