= Al Fattan Marine Towers =

Towers in Dubai, UAE

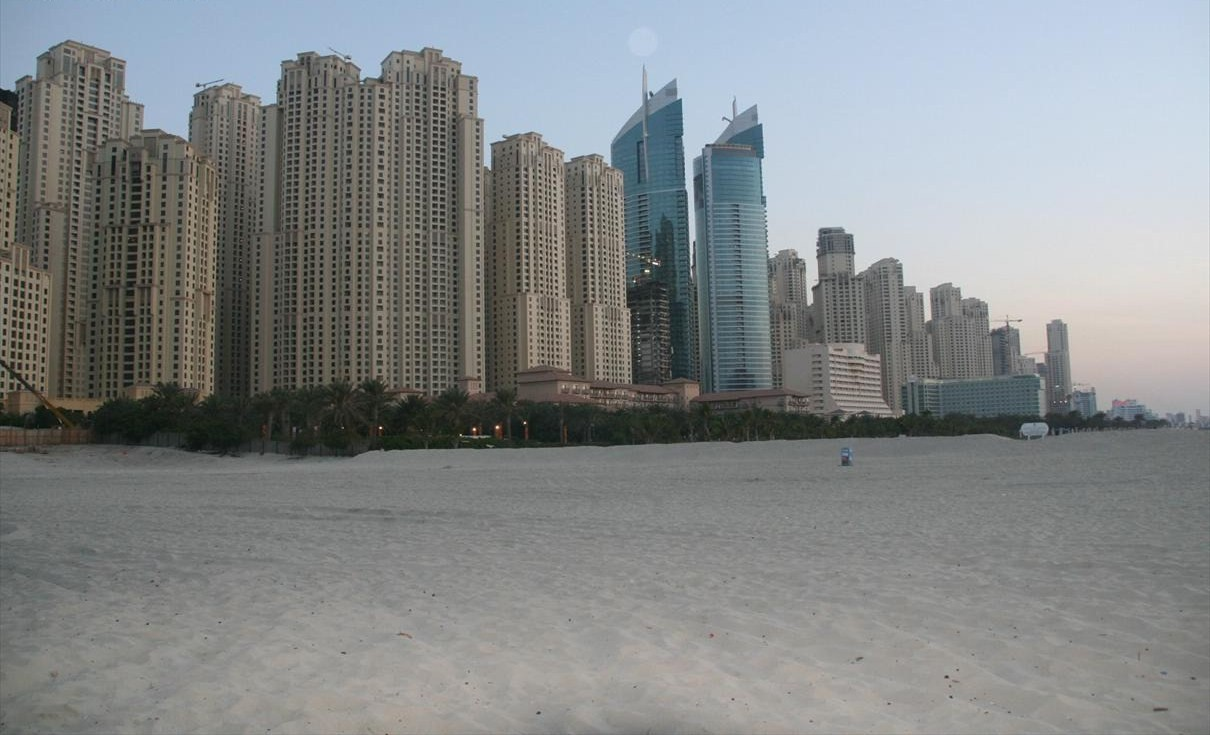
- Fattan Marine Towers in Jumeirah Beach Residences (blue glass buildings)
- Interactive map of the Al Fattan Marine Towers area

General information
- Type: Residential (Tower 1); Hotel (Tower 2)
- Location: Dubai, U.A.E.
- Coordinates: 25°04′45.99″N 55°08′11.02″E
- Construction started: 2004
- Completed: 2006

Height
- Antenna spire: 245 m (804 ft)
- Roof: 230 m (755 ft)

Technical details
- Floor count: 51
- Floor area: 175,000 m^{2} (1,880,000 sq ft)

Design and construction
- Architect: Norr Group Consultants International Ltd.

The Al Fattan Marine Towers is a complex in the Dubai Marina section of Dubai, United Arab Emirates. The towers are located within Jumeirah Beach Residence, a 40-tower, 7,000 unit residential and hotel development which runs alongside Dubai Marina. The Al Fattan Marine Towers consist of two twin 50-story towers, the Al Fattan Tower, and the Oasis Beach Tower, consisting of serviced and residential apartments which have since been sold to individual investors and homeowners. Both towers stand at a height of 245 m (804 ft) and a roof height of 230 m (755 ft), and are the tallest buildings in Jumeirah Beach Residence. Construction of both towers was completed in 2006. Following completion the developer, Al Fattan Properties LLC built a 12-storey office and retail building on an adjacent plot between the towers and Dubai Marina restricting views of the marina from the towers. In 2012 Al Fattan commenced construction of two high-rise towers on the beach in front of the towers which will largely restrict seaviews from Al Fattan Marine Towers. Al Fattan had earlier demolished a 10-story hotel on the site, the Oasis Hotel, which it had built about a decade earlier. Originally Al Fattan proposed to build a mega 97-tower building on the site to be called Burj Al Fattan, however a subsequent decision was made to split the development into two high-rise towers. The exact number of floors is not known as there has been no public disclosure of the project.

Al Fattan Properties LLC is a developer of villas, offices, retail complexes, warehouses, hotels and resorts. A project completed in 2012 is a 5 star 259 room beachfront resort on Palm Jumeirah which also houses 28 luxury residences. The resort, managed by Turkish luxury hotel chain Rixos Hotels has been named Rixos The Palm Dubai.

== See also ==
- List of tallest buildings in Dubai
- List of tallest buildings in the world
