= Rose Rayhaan by Rotana =

Hotel on Sheikh Zayed Road in Dubai, United Arab Emirates

- Seen in March 2016

- Location within United Arab Emirates

General information
- Status: Completed
- Type: Hotel
- Architectural style: Postmodern
- Location: 105 Sheikh Zayed Road, Dubai, United Arab Emirates
- Coordinates: 25.211667°N 55.276389°E
- Construction started: 28 June 2004
- Completed: 7 July 2007; 18 years ago
- Opening: 23 December 2009; 16 years ago
- Owner: Rotana

Height
- Architectural: 333 m (1,093 ft)
- Top floor: 250.1 m (821 ft)

Technical details
- Floor count: 71; 1 below ground
- Floor area: 50,569 m^{2} (544,320 sq ft)
- Lifts/elevators: 8

Design and construction
- Architects: Khatib & Alami Group
- Developer: Abbco Group
- Main contractor: Arabian Construction Company

Other information
- Number of rooms: 684

Website
- Official website

Rose Rayhaan by Rotana, also known as the Rose Tower, is a 72-storey, 333 m (1,093 ft) hotel on Sheikh Zayed Road in Dubai, United Arab Emirates. It is no. 5 on the list of world's tallest hotels. The tower was originally designed to be 380 m (1,250 ft), but modification reduced it to 333m or 1093 ft.

Construction on the tower began in 2004 and was completed in 2007. The design and building contractor were the Arabian Construction Co. On 24 October 2006, the building reached its full height with the addition of the spire. In total height, the hotel surpassed the nearby 321 m (1,053 ft) Burj Al Arab. Although the building and its inner furnishings were finished in 2007, it did not open until 23 December 2009.

The hotel’s form is stylistically varied. The highly embellished façade is composed of two tones of blue and silver mirrored glass with gold ornamentation. A narrow panel of oculiform gold rings stretches up the center of each elevation. Each side of the tower incorporates two convex cylindrical forms that fold into one another. Façade sections flatten towards the top and reach up into an elaborate sculptural peak of intersecting petals, a visual reference to the building’s informal name, “The Rose.” This floral element crowning the tower is topped by a sphere. A spire extending up from the roof is the ultimate pinnacle of the tower making its height extend to 333m high.

Rose Rayhaan by Rotana is one of the first major hotel brands to open in Dubai as alcohol-free. The hotel has two restaurants and a 24-hour coffee shop. Bonyan International Investment Group is the developer and invested $180 million. The building was officially completed with 462 rooms, suites and penthouses. It officially opened on 23 December 2009.

== Gallery ==
Under construction in May 2007

Seen from Burj Khalifa in 2017

== See also ==
- List of tallest hotels in the world
- List of tallest buildings in Dubai
- List of tallest buildings and structures in the world
- List of tallest buildings in the United Arab Emirates

Records
| Preceded by Burj Al Arab | World's tallest hotel 1,093 feet (333 m); 2007–2012 | Succeeded by JW Marriott Marquis Dubai |
