= The Marina Torch =

Residential skyscraper in Dubai

- Interactive map of the The Marina Torch area

General information
- Status: Completed
- Type: Residential
- Location: Dubai, United Arab Emirates
- Coordinates: 25°5′17″N 55°8′51″E
- Construction started: 18 October 2005; 20 years ago
- Topped-out: 10 April 2011; 15 years ago
- Completed: 8 May 2011; 15 years ago
- Opened: 8 June 2011; 15 years ago

Height
- Antenna spire: 352 m (1,155 ft)
- Top floor: 300.1 m (985 ft)

Technical details
- Floor count: 86

Design and construction
- Architects: Khatib and Alami; National Engineering Bureau
- Developer: Select Group
- Main contractor: Dubai Civil Engineering

The Marina Torch, also known as Dubai Torch, Dubai Torch Tower, and The Torch, is a residential skyscraper in Dubai Marina in Dubai, United Arab Emirates. It is 352 metres (1,155 ft) tall, with 86 floors above ground and 4 below, and was the tallest residential building in the world on its completion in 2011, surpassing Q1 in Gold Coast, Australia.

The building was damaged by fire on 21 February 2015, as well as while it was undergoing restorative work on 4 August 2017, and again on 5 January 2019.

As of 2026, it is the 14th-tallest building in Dubai and the eleventh-tallest residential building in the world.

== History and the fire incidents at The Marina Torch building ==
The original concept design by architects Khatib and Alami was 74 floors, with three basement levels and a four-storey podium, and had a total planned built up area of 111,832 m² (1.2 million ft^{2}). It was to have 504 apartments ranging from one to three bedrooms and four duplex apartment suites. The three basement floors and part of the podium were to hold car parking for 536 vehicles, while floors five and six were to contain a swimming pool, health club, gymnasium, cafeteria, aerobic rooms and sit-out cover seal terraces.

However, the original developer of the project for the proposed tower, Al Rashideen Trading Company, transferred ownership of the project to a new developer, Select Group. Select Group then appointed a new consultant, National Engineering Bureau, who amended and modified the concept design and, following delays, eventually secured the necessary approval from Dubai Municipality.

Dubai Municipality's approval of the design was delayed because of its comments on the National Engineering Bureau's modifications to the concept design, and the purported risk of structural failings arising from the design modifications.

In April 2007, the project was running 18 months behind schedule, with the tower's foundations still under construction. The original expected completion date of June 2008 had been extended to late 2009, with the further extension into 2011. The Marina Torch was opened in May 2011.

As built, it has 676 apartments and six retail units. In 2015, the price of a one bedroom apartment started at 1,628,000 AED ($443,295 USD).

There are many residential towers in this part of Dubai and they are popular with expatriates.

In 2016, an Emirates air hostess committed suicide by jumping off the building. She landed on another balcony 24 floors below. The woman was around 34 years old.

=== 2015 fire ===
A fire broke out in the building at 2:00 am on 21 February 2015. Witnesses said the fire started with a grill located on one of the building's balconies. Seven people were treated at the scene for smoke inhalation. Video footage showed structural debris falling from the burning stories to the ground. The fire appeared to have started in the middle of the building and spread rapidly due to falling flaming debris and high winds, which caused the flames to flare up, resulting in "massive problems" for the fire department and a several mile long traffic jam on a nearby highway.

External cladding was charred from the 50th floor to the top of the tower. 101 apartments were deemed uninhabitable and their occupants were offered temporary free lodging by some hotels and houses. Dubai Municipality confirmed that the building's structure was not compromised. Lifts were brought back in phases and eight of the nine lifts were back in operation within a week. By 21 March 2015, 81 units were still not habitable. The remainder of the 676 apartments were back in occupation.

Tenants requesting emergency accommodation were found free hotel accommodation for up to two months. All resident owners are covered by insurance for alternative accommodation for up to three years. In April, after insurance assessment, tenders were drawn up for repair of the damaged building.

Repairs were started in May 2015 under the project management of the building's architect, National Engineering Bureau.

Following this disaster, in the fall of 2015 Dubai Civil Defence announced it would be purchasing several Martin Jetpack single-person aircraft to assist first responders in managing high-rise fires, to be delivered in 2016.

=== 2016 exterior renovation ===
Approval to proceed on a full exterior renovation of the cladding damaged during the fire in terms of building permits was granted by Dubai authorities in July 2016. Scaffolding was erected and building works started.

During this period, the pool facility at the Torch remained closed, mainly due to the risk of safety issues. It was estimated to re-open in October 2016.

=== 2017 fire ===
A significant fire broke out in the building on 4 August 2017, at about 1 am local time; the cause was not initially known. Videos showed debris from the fire falling to the ground and starting a second fire in the streets below. Civil defence officials said they had successfully evacuated the building, with no injuries reported, and had brought the fire under control.

=== 2019 fire ===
A minor fire broke out in the building on 5 January 2019, during the evening. The source of the fire was thought to be on the fifth floor from the building's gym. Residents were allowed to return to the building in the early hours of Sunday morning.

== See also ==
- Dubai Marina
- List of tallest buildings in Dubai
- List of tallest buildings in the United Arab Emirates
- List of tallest residential buildings in the world
