= Chelsea Tower =

Chelsea Tower/Al Salam Tower
- Interactive map of the Chelsea Tower/Al Salam Tower area

General information
- Status: Completed
- Type: Mixed use
- Location: Dubai, United Arab Emirates
- Coordinates: 25°12′41.56″N 55°16′27.56″E
- Construction started: 2002
- Completed: 2005
- Opening: 2005
- Owner: SRG Holding Limited

Height
- Antenna spire: 250 m (820 ft)
- Roof: 230 m (755 ft)
- Top floor: 182 m (597 ft)

Technical details
- Floor count: 48
- Floor area: 65,920 m^{2} (709,557 sq ft)

Design and construction
- Architect: Atkins
- Developer: SRG Holding Limited

Chelsea Tower/Al Salam Tower is a 250-metre (820 ft) skyscraper located on Sheikh Zayed Road in Dubai, United Arab Emirates. The 49-storey building is occupied by Al Salam Hotel Suites, a deluxe serviced apartment tower now managed by SRG Hospitality, a subsidiary of SRG Holding Limited, the developer and owning company of.

Al Salam Tower is the 47th-tallest building in Dubai, and one of the tallest residential buildings in the world. When completed in 2005, Al Salam Tower was the fifth-tallest building in the city.

Al Salam Tower used to be known as Chelsea Tower as it was previously leased and operated by Chelsea Hotel Group. During its construction took over name of 'Al Salam Tower II' after its older next door building Union Tower, which underwent construction as 'Al Salam Tower' Project but it changed its name after purchase.

== See also ==
- List of tallest buildings in Dubai
