= Emirates Crown =

- Emirates Crown in 2015
- Interactive map of the Emirates Crown area

General information
- Status: Completed
- Type: Residential
- Location: Dubai, United Arab Emirates
- Coordinates: 25°05′17″N 55°08′47″E
- Construction started: 2005
- Completed: 2008

Height
- Architectural: 296 m (971 ft)

Technical details
- Floor count: 63

Design and construction
- Architects: Design & Architecture Bureau
- Developer: Bin Shafar Holding

Emirates Crown is a 63-floor residential tower in Dubai, United Arab Emirates, developed by Bin Shafar Holding and designed by Design & Architecture Bureau. The tower has a structural height of 296 m (971 ft). Construction of the Emirates Crown began in 2005, and was completed in 2008. Upon completion, it stood as the sixth-tallest building in Dubai, and 45th-tallest building in the world. As of 2022, it is the 26th-tallest building in Dubai.

Two to five bedroom apartments can be found in the building, as well as some of the most prominent penthouses in Dubai. The amenities include a gymnasium, sauna, Jacuzzi, kids club, swimming pool, steam room and private storage. Located right across the street from the Dubai International Marine Club in the Dubai Marina district, it is a common living location for yachting enthusiasts.

== See also ==
- List of tallest buildings in Dubai
- List of tallest residential buildings in Dubai
- List of tallest buildings in the United Arab Emirates
- List of tallest residential buildings
