= Dimona Radar Facility =

Radar facility located in the Negev desert

- מתקן המכ"ם בדימונה
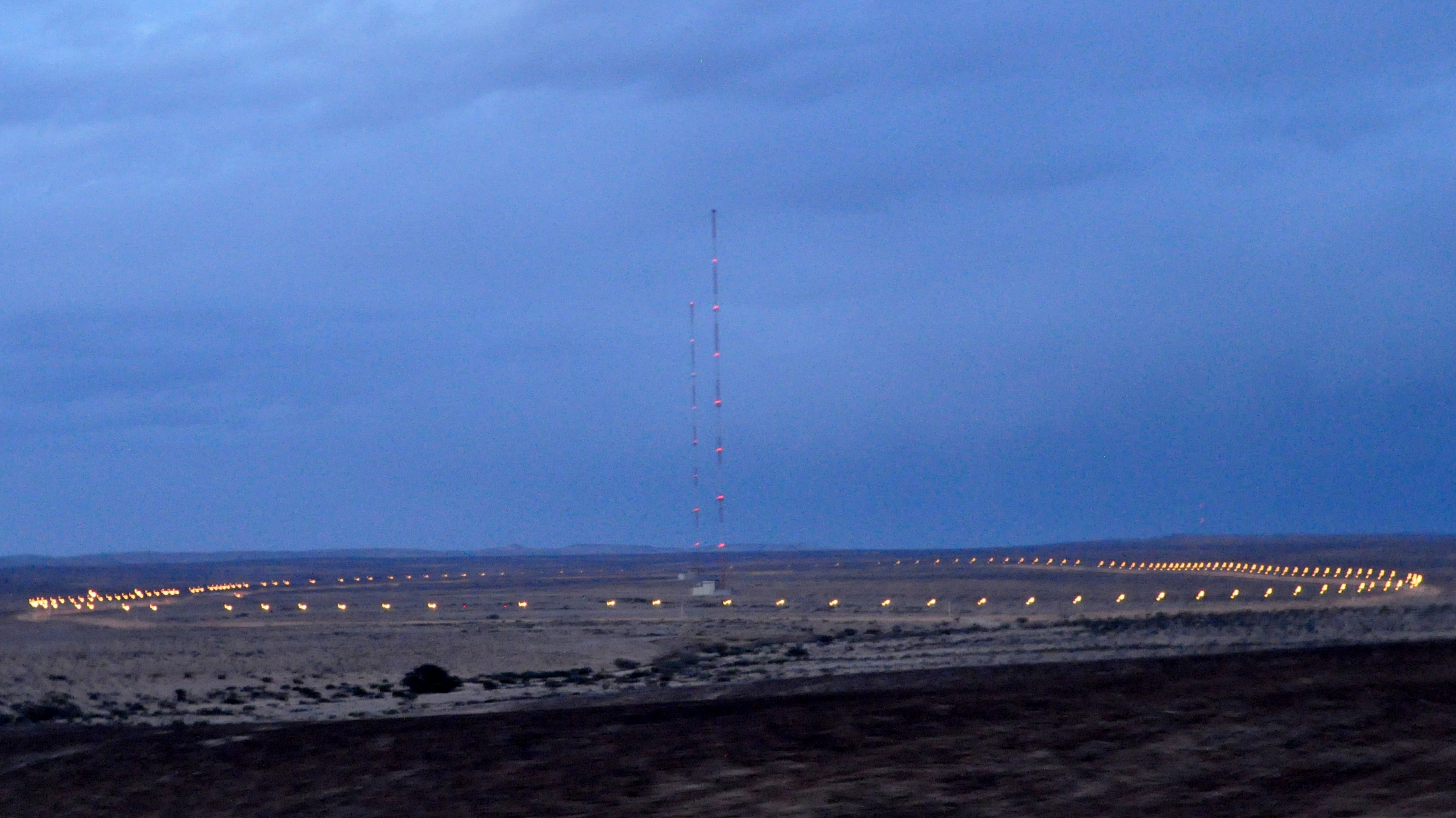
- Transmission antennas of the Dimona Radar Facility, January 2014

- Location within Israel

General information
- Type: Radar facility
- Location: Near Dimona, Israel
- Completed: 2008

Height
- Height: 400 metres (1,300 ft)

The Dimona Radar Facility (Hebrew: מתקן המכ"ם בדימונה) is a Raytheon-built facility located near Dimona, Israel operated by the United States. The facility's stated purpose is detecting, tracking, and intercepting incoming enemy aircraft and ballistic missiles, with a range of up to 2,000 kilometres (1,200 mi), (Note: According to one source, the range might be as high as 2,400 kilometres (1,500 mi).) in particular focusing on threats from Islamic Revolutionary Guard Corps.

== Height ==
At 400 metres (1,300 ft) tall, the two radar towers are the highest radar towers in the world as well as being by far the tallest structures in Israel, beating out the tallest building in Israel, the 308.3-metre-tall (1,011 ft) Beyond Office Tower.

The radar towers' height, as well as the presence of several guy wires used to anchor them in place, inhibits the ability to fly in their immediate surroundings. To solve this, as well as to not disrupt any air force activities in the Negev, the facility was located close to the nearby Nuclear Research Center, whose surroundings were already strictly off-limits to any kind of aviation.
