= Central Park Towers =

General information
- Status: Completed
- Type: Office Tower / Residential / Retail
- Location: Dubai International Financial Centre, Dubai, United Arab Emirates
- Coordinates: 25.20666°N 55.27536°E
- Construction started: 2008
- Topped-out: 2010
- Completed: 2014
- Opening: 2014
- Governing body: Central Park Principal Body Corporate

Technical details
- Floor count: Office Tower - 45; Residential Tower - 47

Design and construction
- Architect: Hopkins Architects
- Developer: Dubai Properties Group; Deyaar
- Main contractor: Arabtec

Other information
- Number of restaurants: 11

Website
- https://www.centralparktowers.ae/

Central Park Towers is a complex of two towers in Dubai International Financial Centre (DIFC) in Dubai, United Arab Emirates. The complex comprises the Office Tower which is 45 floors and 219.9 m (721 ft) tall, and the Residential Tower which is 47 floors and 243 m (797 ft) tall.

== Site ==
Central Park Towers is located in the southwest corner of the Dubai International Financial Centre master community. The areas surrounding Central Park Towers are home to other skyscrapers, including The Index. Financial Centre is the nearest Dubai Metro station.

== Notable Tenants ==
Tenants of the Office Tower include (as of 2024):

- Bank of Singapore Limited (DIFC Branch)
- Federal Tax Authority
- Huxley Global Associates Limited
- ICICI Bank Limited (DIFC Branch)
- Marriott International
- Ministry of Economy
- Al Tamimi & Company
- Tabby

== See also ==
- List of tallest buildings in Dubai
- List of tallest buildings in the United Arab Emirates
