= List of tallest buildings in the United Arab Emirates =

This list of tallest buildings in the United Arab Emirates (UAE) ranks skyscrapers based on official height. The tallest building in the UAE is Burj Khalifa in Dubai, which rises 828 metres (2,717 ft) and contains 163 floors. The tower has stood as both the tallest building in the world and the tallest man-made structure of any kind in the world since its completion in January 2010.

The second tallest building in the UAE is the 425-metre (1,394 ft) Marina 101 in Dubai, which also stands as the world's fourth-tallest residential building after 432 Park Avenue, 111 West 57th Street and Central Park Tower, all of which are in New York City. The tallest buildings in the UAE are mostly located in Dubai and Abu Dhabi.

However, Dubai has more highrises than Abu Dhabi. As of 2023, Dubai has 28 completed and topped-out buildings that rise at least 300 metres (984 ft) in height, which is more than any other city in the world, and 97 completed and topped-out the ten tallest completed building, Dubai has the tallest skyline in the Middle East and the world.

In 2015, the skylines of Dubai was ranked sixth in the world with 248 building rising at least 100 metres (330 ft) in height. As of 2026, Dubai is ranked fourth for cities with the most skyscrapers taller than 150 metres (490 ft), with 251 buildings. Ain dubai was completed in late 2021 and it is over 250 meters.

== Tallest buildings ==
This list ranks completed and topped out skyscrapers in the United Arab Emirates that stand at least 200 metres (656 ft) tall, based on standard height measurement. This includes spires and architectural details but does not include antenna masts. An equal sign (=) following a rank indicates the same height between two or more buildings. The "Year" column indicates the year in which a building was completed.

Burj Khalifa is the tallest building in UAE, as well as the world.

Some of the tallest buildings in Abu Dhabi. The Landmark Tower in the foreground and the World Trade Center in the background

JW Marriott Marquis Dubai, the 3nd tallest hotel in the world

Burj Al Arab, Dubai

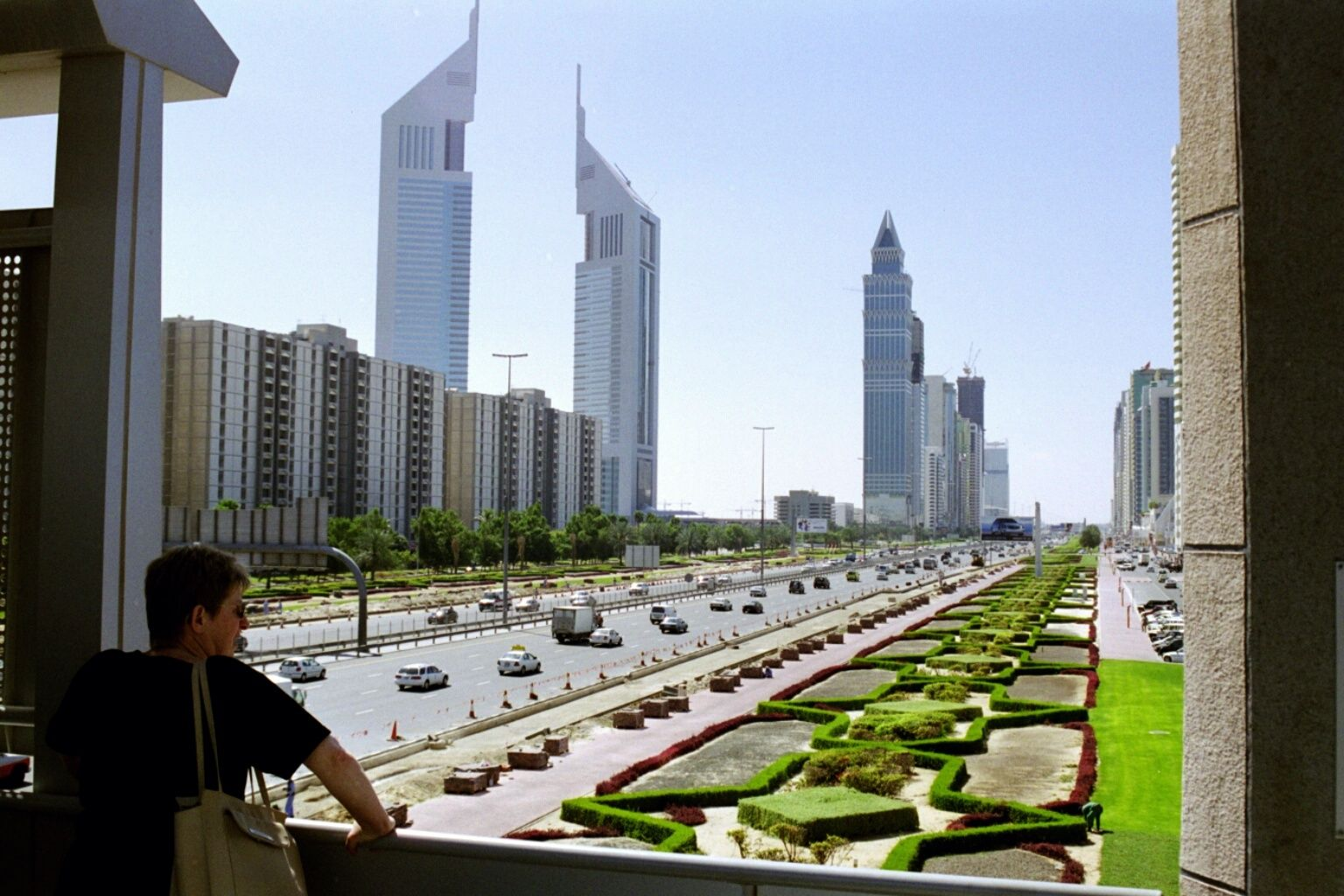
Emirates Towers, Dubai

The Landmark Tower, Abu Dhabi

Was the world's tallest building upon completion.
Indicates buildings still under construction that have been architecturally topped out but not yet fully opened

Rank	Name	Height m (ft)	Floors	Year	City	Notes
1	Burj Khalifa	828 metres (2,717 ft)	163	2010	Dubai	This building was topped out on January 16, 2009, becoming the tallest building in the world.
2	Marina 101	425 metres (1,394 ft)	101	2017	Dubai	Officially opened in 2016 but was actually completed in late 2017.
3	Princess Tower	413 metres (1,355 ft)	101	2012	Dubai	Formerly the tallest all-residential building in the world.
4	23 Marina	392.8 metres (1,289 ft)	89	2012	Dubai	
5	Burj Mohammed bin Rashid	382 metres (1,253 ft)	92	2014	Abu Dhabi	Tallest building in Abu Dhabi, and a WTC headquarters.
6	Elite Residence	380.5 metres (1,248 ft)	87	2012	Dubai	
7	Ciel Tower	377 metres (1,237 ft)	83	2025	Dubai	the tallest hotel in the world.
8	Address Boulevard	370 metres (1,210 ft)	73	2017	Dubai	
9	City Tower One	363 metres (1,191 ft)	94	2026	Dubai	
10	Almas Tower	360 metres (1,180 ft)	68	2009	Dubai	
11 =	Gevora Hotel	356 metres (1,168 ft)	75	2017	Dubai	2nd tallest hotel in the world.
11 =	Il Primo	356 metres (1,168 ft)	79	2023	Dubai	
13 =	JW Marriott Marquis Dubai Tower 1	355 metres (1,165 ft)	82	2012	Dubai	3rd tallest hotel in the world.
13 =	JW Marriott Marquis Dubai Tower 2	355 metres (1,165 ft)	82	2013	Dubai	
13 =	Emirates Office Tower	355 metres (1,165 ft)	54	1999	Dubai	Also known as Emirates Tower One
16 =	The Torch	352 metres (1,155 ft)	86	2011	Dubai	
16 =	Wynn Al Marjan Island	352 metres (1,155 ft)	72	2027	Ras Al Khaimah	Tallest building in Ras Al Khaimah, the first integration casino and hotel resorts in the UAE.
18	Al Habtoor City Tower	345 metres (1,132 ft)	81	2027	Dubai	
19	ADNOC Headquarters	342 metres (1,122 ft)	76	2014	Abu Dhabi	
20	Mercedes Benz Places Binghatti	341 metres (1,119 ft)	71	2027	Dubai	
21	Uptown Tower	340 metres (1,120 ft)	78	2022	Dubai	
22	SLS Dubai Hotel & Residences	336 metres (1,102 ft)	78	2021	Dubai	
23	DAMAC Residenze	335 metres (1,099 ft)	88	2018	Dubai	
24	AMA Tower	334 metres (1,096 ft)	65	2021	Dubai	
25	Rose Rayhaan by Rotana	333 metres (1,093 ft)	72	2007	Dubai	
26 =	The Address Fountain Views III	331 metres (1,086 ft)	77	2019	Dubai	
26 =	Regalia	331 metres (1,086 ft)	70	2026	Dubai	
28	Al Yaqoub Tower	328 metres (1,076 ft)	69	2013	Dubai	
29	The Index	326 metres (1,070 ft)	80	2010	Dubai	
30	The Landmark	324 metres (1,063 ft)	72	2013	Abu Dhabi	
31	Mr. C Residences Downtown	323 metres (1,060 ft)	72	2026	Dubai	
32	Burj Al Arab	321 metres (1,053 ft)	56	1999	Dubai	Tallest building in the world used exclusively as a hotel at the time of its completion, also the only hotel in the world to receive a 7-Star rating
33	HHHR Tower	318 metres (1,043 ft)	72	2010	Dubai	
34	Sky Tower	312 metres (1,024 ft)	83	2010	Abu Dhabi	
35	Ocean Heights	310 metres (1,020 ft)	83	2010	Dubai	
36	Jumeirah Emirates Towers Hotel	309 metres (1,014 ft)	56	2000	Dubai	Also known as Emirates Tower Two
37 =	Amna Tower	307 metres (1,007 ft)	75	2019	Dubai	
37 =	Noora Tower	307 metres (1,007 ft)	75	2020	Dubai	
39	Cayan Tower	306 metres (1,004 ft)	76	2012	Dubai	Under construction – building was topped out in 2012.
40	Etihad Tower 2	305 metres (1,001 ft)	77	2011	Abu Dhabi	
41	One Za'abeel Tower 1	305 metres (1,001 ft)	67	2023	Dubai	
42	The Address Beach Resort	303 metres (994 ft)	78	2020	Dubai	
43	The Address Downtown Dubai	302 metres (991 ft)	63	2008	Dubai	
44	Al Wasl Tower	301 metres (988 ft)	64	2024	Dubai	
45	Emirates Crown	296 metres (971 ft)	63	2008	Dubai	
46	Forte Towers 1	295 metres (968 ft)	72	2023	Dubai	
47 =	Khalid Al Attar Tower 2	294 metres (965 ft)	66	2011	Dubai	
47 =	Islamic Bank Office Tower^{[A]}	294 metres (965 ft)	49	2011	Dubai	
49	Grande Signature Residences	290 metres (950 ft)	78	2023	Dubai	
50 =	Opera Grand	288 metres (945 ft)	71	2021	Dubai	
50 =	Sulafa Tower	288 metres (945 ft)	75	2010	Dubai	
52 =	Millennium Tower	285 metres (935 ft)	60	2006	Dubai	
52 =	Palm Beach Towers 3^{[A]}	285 metres (935 ft)	61	2026	Dubai	
54	D1	284 metres (932 ft)	80	2015	Dubai	
55	The Address Fountain Views II	283 metres (928 ft)	70	2018	Dubai	
56 =	The Address Fountain Views I	282 metres (925 ft)	70	2018	Dubai	
56 =	ICD Brookfield Place	282 metres (925 ft)	54	2020	Dubai	
56 =	Al Hekma Tower	282 metres (925 ft)	62	2015	Dubai	
56 =	City of the Lights C1 Tower	282 metres (925 ft)	62	2015	Abu Dhabi	
60	Five Jumeirah Village Dubai	281 metres (922 ft)	61	2019	Dubai	
61 =	Marina Pinnacle	280 metres (920 ft)	73	2011	Dubai	
61 =	Address Harbour Point Tower 1	280 metres (920 ft)	67	2022	Dubai	
63	Boulevard Point	279 metres (915 ft)	69	2020	Dubai	
64	Trust Tower	278 m (912 ft)	60	2013	Abu Dhabi	Offices of the Abu Dhabi World Trade Center Central Market Project.
65	Etihad Tower 1	277 metres (909 ft)	70	2011	Abu Dhabi	
66	Burj Vista Tower 1	272 metres (892 ft)	65	2018	Dubai	
67 =	Radisson Royal Dubai	269 metres (883 ft)	60	2010	Dubai	
67 =	St. Regis Dubai Opera The Residence Tower 1	269 metres (883 ft)	68	2027	Dubai	
67 =	21st Century Tower	269 metres (883 ft)	55	2003	Dubai	
70 =	Nation Towers - Tower A	268 metres (879 ft)	65	2011	Abu Dhabi	
70 =	DAMAC Paramount Hotel & Residences	268 metres (879 ft)	68	2018	Dubai	
70 =	DAMAC Maison-Paramount Tower 1	268 metres (879 ft)	68	2018	Dubai	
70 =	DAMAC Maison-Paramount Tower 2	268 metres (879 ft)	68	2018	Dubai	
70 =	DAMAC Maison-Paramount Tower 3	268 metres (879 ft)	68	2018	Dubai	
75 =	Al Kazim Tower 1	265 metres (869 ft)	53	2008	Dubai	
75 =	Al Kazim Tower 2	265 metres (869 ft)	53	2008	Dubai	
77	Address Sky View Tower 1	264 metres (866 ft)	60	2019	Dubai	
78	Ubora Tower 1	263 metres (863 ft)	58	2010	Dubai	
79	Marina Gate I	262 metres (860 ft)	66	2019	Dubai	
80	Islamic Bank Residential Tower	261 metres (856 ft)	51	2011	Dubai	
81 =	Etihad Tower 3	260 metres (850 ft)	62	2011	Abu Dhabi	
81 =	Vision Tower	260 metres (850 ft)	60	2008	Dubai	
81 =	The Address Residences Dubai Opera Tower 1	260 metres (850 ft)	65	2022	Dubai	
84	Downtown Views II Tower 1	259 metres (850 ft)	67	2022	Dubai	
85 =	Paramount Tower Hotel & Residences	258 metres (846 ft)	65	2021	Dubai	
85 =	FIVE Luxe	258 metres (846 ft)	56	2023	Dubai	
87 =	Regent Emirates Pearl	255 metres (837 ft)	52	2016	Abu Dhabi	
87 =	Conrad Dubai^{[A]}	255 metres (837 ft)	51	2012	Dubai	Under construction – building was topped out in 2012.
89	Dubai Marriott Harbour Hotel & Suites	254 metres (833 ft)	59	2007	Dubai	Also known as the Al Marsa Tower.
90	The Grand at Dubai Creek Harbour	253 metres (830 ft)	63	2022	Dubai	
91 =	Angsana Suites Tower	250 metres (820 ft)	49	2007	Dubai	
91 =	Chelsea Tower	250 metres (820 ft)	49	2005	Dubai	
91 =	St. Regis Residences Financial Center Road (Adventz Tower)^{[A]}	250 metres (820 ft)	62	2025	Dubai	
91 =	Vida Residences Dubai Mall Tower 1	250 metres (820 ft)	56	2023	Dubai	
95	Al Tayer Tower	249 metres (817 ft)	59	2009	Dubai	
96 =	Sun Tower	248 metres (814 ft)	65	2010	Abu Dhabi	
96 =	Downtown Views I	248 metres (814 ft)	58	2021	Dubai	
98	Rolex Tower	247 metres (810 ft)	63	2010	Dubai	
99 =	Aykon City Tower 1	246 metres (807 ft)	63	2022	Dubai	
99 =	Aykon City Tower 2	246 metres (807 ft)	63	2022	Dubai	
101 =	Al Fattan Tower	245 metres (804 ft)	51	2006	Dubai	
101 =	Oasis Beach Tower	245 metres (804 ft)	51	2006	Dubai	
103	AAM Tower	244 metres (801 ft)	46	2008	Dubai	Also known as the Arenco Tower
104	The Tower	243 metres (797 ft)	54	2002	Dubai	
105	Downtown Views II Tower 2	242 metres (794 ft)	62	2022	Dubai	
106 =	Sama Tower	240 metres (790 ft)	51	2009	Dubai	
106 =	The Palm Tower	240 metres (790 ft)	52	2021	Dubai	
108	Aspin Commercial Tower	239 metres (784 ft)	56	2012	Dubai	
109 =	Vida Residences Downtown Dubai	238 metres (781 ft)	59	2018	Dubai	
109 =	The Gate Residential Tower 1	238 metres (781 ft)	66	2013	Abu Dhabi	
109 =	The Gate Residential Tower 2	238 metres (781 ft)	66	2013	Abu Dhabi	
109 =	The Gate Residential Tower 3	238 metres (781 ft)	66	2013	Abu Dhabi	
113	Address Harbour Point Tower 2	237 metres (778 ft)	57	2022	Dubai	
114 =	Churchill Residence	235 metres (771 ft)	61	2010	Dubai	
114 =	The Buildings by Daman^{[A]}	235 metres (771 ft)	65	2012	Dubai	Under construction – building was topped out in 2012
114 =	One Za'abeel Tower 2	235 metres (771 ft)	57	2022	Dubai	
114 =	Address Sky View Tower 2	235 metres (771 ft)	55	2019	Dubai	
118 =	Park Place	234 metres (768 ft)	56	2007	Dubai	
118 =	Etihad Tower 4	234 metres (768 ft)	61	2011	Abu Dhabi	
120	Nation Towers - Tower B	233 metres (764 ft)	52	2012	Abu Dhabi	
121	Mag 218 Tower	232 metres (761 ft)	66	2010	Dubai	
121 =	Novotel Jumeirah Village Triangle	231 metres (758 ft)	56	2021	Dubai	
123 =	Sofitel Dubai The Obelisk	230 metres (750 ft)	50	2020	Dubai	
123 =	W Residences Dubai Downtown^{[A]}	230 metres (750 ft)	53	2026	Dubai	
123 =	The Address Residences Dubai Opera Tower 2	230 metres (750 ft)	55	2022	Dubai	
126 =	Vida Hotel and Residences - Dubai Marina Yacht Club	229 metres (751 ft)	57	2022	Dubai	
126 =	The S Tower	229 metres (751 ft)	62	2023	Dubai	
128	The Leaf	227 metres (745 ft)	60	2018	Abu Dhabi	
128 =	Al Tayer Tower	225 metres (738 ft)	59	2009	Dubai	Also known as the Manazel Al Safa Tower
128 =	Nestle Plaza	225 metres (738 ft)	58	2008	Sharjah	Tallest buildings in Sharjah
131	Jumeirah Living Marina Gate	224 metres (735 ft)	56	2020	Dubai	
132	Sharjah Gate Tower	223 metres (732 ft)	56	2008	Sharjah	
133	Palm Tower 1	222 metres (728 ft)	54	2009	Sharjah	
134 =	The Bay Gate^{[A]}	221 metres (725 ft)	53	2014	Dubai	Under construction – building topped out in 2008
134 =	Angsana Hotel Tower	221 metres (725 ft)	49	2008	Dubai	
134 =	Angsana Suites Tower	221 metres (725 ft)	49	2007	Dubai	
137 =	Trident Grand Residence	220 metres (720 ft)	45	2009	Dubai	
137 =	Burj Royale	220 metres (720 ft)	58	2022	Dubai	
137 =	Al Bateen Tower	220 metres (720 ft)	55	2013	Dubai	Under construction – building topped out in 2013.
140 =	1/JBR	219 metres (719 ft)	53	2019	Dubai	
140 =	Peninsula Four Tower A	219 metres (719 ft)	54	2026	Dubai	
140 =	Peninsula Four Tower B	219 metres (719 ft)	54	2026	Dubai	
143	Jumeirah Bay 2	218 metres (715 ft)	47	2009	Dubai	
144 =	Sama Tower	217 metres (712 ft)	50	2013	Abu Dhabi	
144 =	Etihad Towers 5	217 metres (712 ft)	57	2011	Abu Dhabi	
146 =	Jumeirah Beach Residence Sadaf 4	216 metres (709 ft)	54	2007	Dubai	
146 =	Amwaj Rotana Resort	216 metres (709 ft)	25	2007	Dubai	
146 =	Jumeirah Beach Residence Sadaf 4	216 metres (709 ft)	54	2007	Dubai	
149 =	Downtown Views II Tower 3	215 metres (705 ft)	55	2022	Dubai	
149 =	Al Seef Tower	215 metres (705 ft)	46	2005	Dubai	
151 =	Sarh Al Emarat Tower	214 metres (702 ft)	55	2013	Sharjah	
151 =	Act One	214 metres (702 ft)	53	2022	Dubai	
153 =	Meera Tower	213 metres (699 ft)	53	2019	Dubai	
153 =	Corniche Tower	213 metres (699 ft)	54	2010	Ajman	Tallest buildings in Ajman
153 =	The Society House^{[A]}	213 metres (699 ft)	55	2026	Dubai	
156 =	Al Rostamani Maze Tower	210 metres (690 ft)	56	2011	Dubai	
156 =	Grosvenor House The Residence	210 metres (690 ft)	48	2010	Dubai	
156 =	Grosvenor House West Marina Beach	210 metres (690 ft)	48	2005	Dubai	
156 =	Al Rostamani Maze Tower	210 metres (690 ft)	56	2010	Dubai	
156 =	Latifa Tower	210 metres (690 ft)	56	2010	Dubai	
156 =	Le Rêve	210 metres (690 ft)	50	2006	Dubai	
156 =	Al Batha Tower	210 metres (690 ft)	48	2019	Dubai	
156 =	Capital Plaza Residences Tower	210 metres (690 ft)	51	2011	Abu Dhabi	
156 =	Palm Beach Towers 1^{[A]}	210 metres (690 ft)	51	2026	Dubai	
165 =	The One Tower	209 metres (686 ft)	51	2015	Dubai	
165 =	Peninsula Three	209 metres (686 ft)	50	2026	Dubai	
167 =	Marina Heights Tower	208 metres (682 ft)	55	2006	Dubai	
167 =	Executive Tower M	208 metres (682 ft)	52	2009	Dubai	
167 =	Jumeirah Beach Residence Bahar 1	208 metres (682 ft)	52	2007	Dubai	
167 =	Stella Marris	208 metres (682 ft)	54	2022	Dubai	
167 =	Al Waha Residences	208 metres (682 ft)	53	2010	Sharjah	
167 =	Harbour Views Tower 1	208 metres (682 ft)	51	2020	Dubai	
167 =	Harbour Views Tower 2	208 metres (682 ft)	51	2020	Dubai	
174 =	The 118	207 metres (679 ft)	46	2016	Dubai	
174 =	Majesty Tower	207 metres (679 ft)	52	2009	Sharjah	
174 =	Marina Crown	207 metres (679 ft)	52	2006	Dubai	
174 =	Tamani Hotel Marina	207 metres (679 ft)	54	2006	Dubai	
178	Marina Gate II	206 metres (676 ft)	52	2018	Dubai	
179 =	Horizon Tower A	205 metres (673 ft)	48	2017	Abu Dhabi	
179 =	Palm Beach Towers 2^{[A]}	205 metres (673 ft)	49	2026	Dubai	
179 =	RP Heights	205 metres (673 ft)	50	2020	Dubai	
182	Nassima Tower	204 metres (669 ft)	49	2010	Dubai	
183	48 Burj Gate	203 metres (666 ft)	51	2014	Dubai	
184	Dubai Mixed-Use Towers	202 metres (663 ft)	61	2013	Dubai	Under construction – building topped out in 2012.
185	The Citadel	201 metres (659 ft)	48	2008	Dubai	
186 =	BLVD Heights Tower 1	200 metres (660 ft)	53	2020	Dubai	
186 =	Bugatti Residences	200 metres (660 ft)	48	2027	Dubai	
186 =	Capital Plaza Office Towers	200 metres (660 ft)	40	2011	Abu Dhabi	
186 =	MBK Tower	200 metres (660 ft)	59	2010	Dubai	
186 =	Shangri-La Hotel	200 metres (660 ft)	43	2003	Dubai	
186 =	Al Bateen Residences	200 metres (660 ft)	50	2013	Dubai	
186 =	Al Noor Tower	200 metres (660 ft)	43	2003	Sharjah	

== Tallest under construction, on-hold, approved and proposed ==
=== Under construction ===
This lists buildings that are currently under construction in the United Arab Emirates and are expected to rise to a height of at least 200 metres (656 ft). Buildings under construction that have already been topped out are also included.

Rank	Name	Height Metres / Feet	Floors	Year	City	Notes
1	Burj Azizi	725 metres (2,379 ft)	132	2029	Dubai	
2	Burj Binghatti Jacob & Co Residences	557 metres (1,827 ft)	105	2027	Dubai	
3	Tiger Sky Tower	532 metres (1,745 ft)	116	2029	Dubai	
4	Six Senses Residences Dubai Marina	517 metres (1,696 ft)	122	2028	Dubai	Would become tallest all-residential building in the world if completed.
5	Aeternitas Tower	450 metres (1,480 ft)	106	2027	Dubai	
6	DWTN Residences	445 metres (1,460 ft)	110	2030	Dubai	
7	Muraba Veil	380 metres (1,250 ft)	74	2028	Dubai	
8	Skyscape Altius	374.9 metres (1,230 ft)	91	2028	Dubai	
9	Bayz 101 Tower	363 metres (1,191 ft)	108	2028	Dubai	
10	Bayz 102 Tower	362 metres (1,188 ft)	103	2028	Dubai	
11	Binghatti Skyblade	357 metres (1,171 ft)	66	2027	Dubai	
12	Nebula Tower	351 metres (1,152 ft)	90	2028	Dubai	
13	Trump International Hotel and Tower Dubai	350 metres (1,150 ft)	80	2031	Dubai	
14	Rixos Financial Center Road Residences	348 metres (1,142 ft)	87	2027	Dubai	
15	SRG Tower	346 metres (1,135 ft)	90	2027	Dubai	
16	Safa Two de Grisogono	340 metres (1,120 ft)	87	2027	Dubai	
17	25h Heimat	326 metres (1,070 ft)	74	2028	Dubai	
18	Como Residences	317 metres (1,040 ft)	75	2027	Dubai	Tallest buildings of Palm Jumeirah
19	Cavalli Tower	306 metres (1,004 ft)	71	2026	Dubai	
20 =	Dubai Pearl Tower	300 metres (980 ft)	73	2026	Dubai	
20 =	Tameer Commercial Tower	300 metres (980 ft)	74	2014	Abu Dhabi	
22	One by Binghatti	296 metres (971 ft)	68	2028	Dubai	
23	Skyscaper Avenue	294 metres (965 ft)	55	2028	Dubai	
24	Skyvue Stellar	293 metres (961 ft)	78	2029	Dubai	
25	Iconic Tower by Mered	290 metres (950 ft)	68	2028	Dubai	
26	Binghatti Circle	288 metres (945 ft)	70	2029	Dubai	
27	Volta Tower	284 metres (932 ft)	64	2028	Dubai	
28	Address Grand Downtown	283 metres (928 ft)	55	2028	Dubai	
29	Central Market Commercial Tower	280 metres (920 ft)	65	2015	Abu Dhabi	
30	Fairmont Residences Solara Tower	277 metres (909 ft)	55	2029	Dubai	
31	Sobha Seahaven Tower 1	275 metres (902 ft)	68	2027	Dubai	
32	Safa One de Grisogono Tower 1	267 metres (876 ft)	62	2026	Dubai	
33	Fashionz by Danube	262 metres (860 ft)	62	2027	Dubai	
34 =	310 Riverside Crescent	261 metres (856 ft)	73	2027	Dubai	
34 =	360 Riverside Crescent	261 metres (856 ft)	73	2027	Dubai	
36	The Key Tower	255 metres (837 ft)	51	2028	Dubai	
37	Central Market Hotel Tower	254 metres (833 ft)	58	2015	Abu Dhabi	
38	Habtoor Grand Residence	253 metres (830 ft)	60	2027	Dubai	
39 =	Ahmed Khoory Tower	250 metres (820 ft)	60	2013	Dubai	
39 =	Binghatti Skyrise West Tower	250 metres (820 ft)	54	2028	Dubai	Binghatti Skyrise was in Construction of the skyscraper began in February 2025 and was scheduled for completion in 2028. After is Binghatti Skyrise Is however, work was suspended in November 2025 due to the consequences of the Great Recession.
39 =	Binghatti Skyrise East Tower	250 metres (820 ft)	54	2028	Dubai	Binghatti Skyrise was in Construction of the skyscraper began in February 2025 and was scheduled for completion in 2028. After is Binghatti Skyrise Is however, work was suspended in November 2025 due to the consequences of the Great Recession.
39 =	Binghatti Skyrise South Tower	250 metres (820 ft)	54	2028	Dubai	Binghatti Skyrise was in Construction of the skyscraper began in February 2025 and was scheduled for completion in 2028. After is Binghatti Skyrise Is however, work was suspended in November 2025 due to the consequences of the Great Recession.
43	Sobha One	249 metres (817 ft)	69	2028	Dubai	
44 =	320 Riverside Crescent	247 metres (810 ft)	65	2027	Dubai	
44 =	350 Riverside Crescent	247 metres (810 ft)	65	2027	Dubai	
46	Sobha Seahaven Tower 2	245 metres (804 ft)	59	2027	Dubai	
47 =	Kempinski Marina Residences	240 metres (790 ft)	59	2027	Dubai	
47 =	The Chedi Private Residences	240 metres (790 ft)	51	2029	Dubai	
49	The Gate Residential Tower 4	238 metres (781 ft)	66	2028	Abu Dhabi	
50	Baccarat Hotel & Residences Dubai Tower 1	237 metres (778 ft)	44	2027	Dubai	
51	Creek Vista Heights Tower A	236 metres (774 ft)	64	2026	Dubai	
52 =	Burj-Al-Salam	235 metres (771 ft)	58	2013	Dubai	
52 =	Eden House Za'abeel	235 metres (771 ft)	53	2030	Dubai	
54	Skyvue Solair	234 metres (768 ft)	58	2029	Dubai	
55	Address Residences Zaabeel Tower 1	233 metres (764 ft)	63	2029	Dubai	
56 =	Verde by Sobha	230 metres (750 ft)	59	2026	Dubai	
56 =	Shahrukhz by Danube	230 metres (750 ft)	56	2029	Dubai	
58 =	330 Riverside Crescent	229 metres (751 ft)	57	2027	Dubai	
58 =	340 Riverside Crescent	229 metres (751 ft)	57	2027	Dubai	
60 =	Tameer Tower C	227 metres (745 ft)	62	2014	Abu Dhabi	
60 =	SO/ Hotel Business Bay	227 metres (745 ft)	54	2027	Dubai	
62	Fairmont Dubai Skyline Hotel	226 metres (741 ft)	56	2024	Dubai	
63	Marriott Residences JLT	222 metres (728 ft)	51	2027	Dubai	
64 =	The Bay Gate^{[A]}	221 metres (725 ft)	53	2013	Dubai	Under Construction - building was topped out in 2008.
65 =	DAMAC Bay 2 by Cavalli	220 metres (720 ft)	60	2027	Dubai	
65 =	Akala Hotel Tower 1	220 metres (720 ft)	50	2029	Dubai	
65 =	Akala Residences Tower 2	220 metres (720 ft)	50	2029	Dubai	
68	Creek Vista Heights Tower B	215 metres (705 ft)	58	2026	Dubai	
69	Address Residences Zaabeel Tower 2	214 metres (702 ft)	59	2029	Dubai	
70	Inaura Hotel and Residences	210 metres (690 ft)	47	2030	Dubai	
71 =	Canal Heights by Grisogono Tower 2	208 metres (682 ft)	49	2027	Dubai	
71 =	Binghatti Sky Terraces	208 metres (682 ft)	49	2028	Dubai	
73	Kanyon by Beyond	207 metres (679 ft)	55	2030	Dubai	
74	Address Residences Zaabeel Tower 3	205 metres (673 ft)	57	2029	Dubai	
75	The Bristol	204 metres (669 ft)	54	2028	Dubai	
76 =	Safa One de Grisogono Tower 2	200 metres (660 ft)	45	2026	Dubai	
76 =	Mar Casa	200 metres (660 ft)	52	2026	Dubai	
76 =	DAMAC Bay 1 by Cavalli Tower 1	200 metres (660 ft)	57	2027	Dubai	
76 =	DAMAC Bay 1 by Cavalli Tower 2	200 metres (660 ft)	57	2027	Dubai	
76 =	DAMAC Bay 1 by Cavalli Tower 3	200 metres (660 ft)	57	2027	Dubai	
76 =	Address Residences Zaabeel Tower 4	200 metres (660 ft)	55	2029	Dubai	
76 =	Elitz by Danube Tower 1	200 metres (660 ft)	47	2026	Dubai	

=== On-hold ===
This table lists buildings that were at one time under construction in Dubai and were expected to rise at least 180 metres (591 ft) in height, but are now on-hold. While not officially cancelled, construction has been suspended on each development.

Rank	Name	Height m (ft)	Floors	Year (est.)	City	Notes
1	Nakheel Tower	1,136 metres (3,727 ft)	226	–	Dubai	The tower was projects cancelled in December 2009
2	Dubai Towers Dubai Tower 1	552 metres (1,811 ft)	97	—	Dubai	The tower was cancelled project in 2012
3	Burj Al Alam	510 metres (1,670 ft)	108	–	Dubai	The tower was project cancelled in January 2015.
4	Dubai Towers Dubai Tower 2	464 metres (1,522 ft)	78	–	Dubai	the tower was cancelled project in 2012
5	Lam Tara Tower 1	454 metres (1,490 ft)	88	–	Dubai	The tower project was officially cancelled in 2012.
6	Dubai Towers Dubai Tower 3	416 metres (1,365 ft)	74	–	Dubai	The tower was cancelled project in 2012
7	Lighthouse Tower	402 metres (1,319 ft)	64	–	Dubai	The tower was project cancelled on 2013
8	La Maison by HDS	386 metres (1,266 ft)	105	?	Dubai	
9	Lam Tara Tower 2	384 metres (1,260 ft)	77	–	Dubai	The tower project was officially cancelled in 2012.
10	Dubai Towers Dubai Tower 4	368 metres (1,207 ft)	63	–	Dubai	the tower was cancelled project in 2012
11	Flame Towers	350 metres (1,150 ft)	67	?	Dubai	
12	The Skyscraper	330 metres (1,080 ft)	66	?	Dubai	
13	Kempinski Residences Business Bay	276 metres (906 ft)	63	?	Dubai	
14 =	The Palm Trump International Hotel & Tower	270 metres (890 ft)	62	2031	Dubai	
14 =	Rosemont Hotel	270 metres (890 ft)	55	?	Dubai	
16	Rosemont Residences	268 metres (879 ft)	53	?	Dubai	
17	Anantara Hotel	234 metres (768 ft)	45	2008	Dubai	
18	Empire Tower	230 metres (750 ft)	58	?	Abu Dhabi	
19	Tameer Tower A	227 metres (745 ft)	62	2010	Abu Dhabi	
20 =	Jumeirah Lake Apartments	219 metres (719 ft)	40	?	Dubai	
20 =	Jumeirah Lake Offices	219 metres (719 ft)	40	?	Dubai	
22	Al Boraq Tower	210 metres (690 ft)	45	2009	Dubai	

=== Approved ===
This table lists buildings that are approved for construction in the United Arab Emirates and are expected to rise at least 180 metres (591 ft) in height.

Rank	Name	Height* m (ft)	Floors	Year* (est.)	City	Notes
1	Uptown Dubai Tower 1	711 metres (2,333 ft)	146	?	Dubai	
2 =	Avior Towers 1	650 metres (2,130 ft)	133	2031	Dubai	
2 =	Avior Towers 2	650 metres (2,130 ft)	133	2031	Dubai	
4	Burj Jumeirah	550 metres (1,800 ft)	112	2023	Dubai	
5	Alpha Towers	545 metres (1,788 ft)	110	—	Dubai	
6	Corinthia Dubai	501 metres (1,644 ft)	102	2030	Dubai	
7	RP One Tower	500 metres (1,600 ft)	112	2030	Dubai	
8	New Dubai Skyline Tower	495 metres (1,624 ft)	124	—	Dubai	
9	The Jumeirah Business Bay	485 metres (1,591 ft)	100	—	Dubai	
10	Sobha Skyparks	450 metres (1,480 ft)	109	2030	Dubai	
11	Hirmas Tower	440 metres (1,440 ft)	107	—	Dubai	
12	Sharjah H1 Tower	435 metres (1,427 ft)	104	?	Sharjah	
13	Christian A. Rockefeller Tower	400 metres (1,300 ft)	88	2031	Dubai	
14	SZR Tower	385 metres (1,263 ft)	100	—	Dubai	
15 =	Lumena Alta by Omniyat	380 metres (1,250 ft)	72	2030	Dubai	
15 =	Maybourne Tower 1	380 metres (1,250 ft)	88	2032	Dubai	
17	The Pinnacle at Sobha Central	369 metres (1,211 ft)	99	2030	Dubai	
18	Waldorf Astoria Residences Dubai Business Bay	350 metres (1,150 ft)	70	2029	Dubai	
19	Vision Iconic Tower	342 metres (1,122 ft)	82	2031	Dubai	
20	The Mirage at Sobha Central	330 metres (1,080 ft)	83	2030	Dubai	
21	Maybourne Tower 2	322 metres (1,056 ft)	73	2032	Dubai	
22 =	Dubai Investments Tower	300 metres (980 ft)	70	—	Dubai	
22 =	Juna Dubai Tower 1	300 metres (980 ft)	60	—	Dubai	
22 =	Vertex Tower	300 metres (980 ft)	85	—	Dubai	
22 =	Vision One Eleven	300 metres (980 ft)	71	2031	Dubai	
26	Avarra by Palace	299 metres (981 ft)	78	2031	Dubai	
27	Berkeley Tower	298 metres (978 ft)	62	2031	Dubai	
28	Sobha Signature	292 metres (958 ft)	61	—	Dubai	
29	The Grand Boulevard Tower	291 metres (955 ft)	69	—	Dubai	
30 =	Mada'in Heights	290 metres (950 ft)	78	2027	Dubai	
30 =	Skyvue Altius	290 metres (950 ft)	77	2030	Dubai	
32	Al Habtoor 1970 Office Tower	289 metres (948 ft)	63	2030	Dubai	
33 =	The Gate North Tower	285 metres (935 ft)	65	—	Dubai	
33 =	The Gate South Tower	285 metres (935 ft)	65	—	Dubai	
33 =	The Horizon at Sobha Central	285 metres (935 ft)	76	2029	Dubai	
36	The Sapphire by DAMAC	283.7 metres (931 ft)	56	2028	Dubai	
37	Sol Luxe Tower	280 metres (920 ft)	62	2029	Dubai	
38	The Element at Sobha One	270 metres (890 ft)	68	2029	Dubai	
39	The Eden at Sobha Central	268 metres (879 ft)	71	2029	Dubai	
40	Lumena by Omniyat	260 metres (850 ft)	49	2029	Dubai	
41	Auresta Tower	255 metres (837 ft)	63	—	Dubai	
42	Serene at Sobha Central	251 metres (823 ft)	66	2029	Dubai	
43	Burjside Terrace	248 metres (814 ft)	62	—	Dubai	
44	Jumeirah Residence Emirates Towers A	243 metres (797 ft)	60	2030	Dubai	
45	Maybourne Tower 3	239 metres (784 ft)	55	2032	Dubai	
46	Tranquil at Sobha Central	234 metres (768 ft)	61	2029	Dubai	
47 =	Jumeirah Residence Emirates Towers B	233 metres (764 ft)	57	2030	Dubai	
48	Elitz 2 by Danube Tower 1	230 metres (750 ft)	52	2027	Dubai	
49	Elitz 2 by Danube Tower 2	225 metres (738 ft)	49	2027	Dubai	
50	Etihad Tower 5	217 metres (712 ft)	56	2011	Abu Dhabi	
51	Elitz 3 by Danube Tower 1	215 metres (705 ft)	51	2027	Dubai	
52 =	Al Boraq Tower	210 metres (690 ft)	45	—	Dubai	
53	Elitz 3 by Danube Tower 2	205 metres (673 ft)	47	2027	Dubai	
54 =	IRIS Mist	200 metres (660 ft)	54	—	Dubai	
54 =	The Sheffield Tower	200 metres (660 ft)	46	—	Dubai	
54 =	Hial Tower	200 metres (660 ft)	44	2031	Sharjah	
54 =	Shahrukhz 2 by Danube	200 metres (660 ft)	60	2030	Dubai	
54 =	Fortune Araames	200 metres (660 ft)	45	—	Dubai	Considered to be a stale proposal
59	El Matador Tower	185 metres (607 ft)	43	—	Dubai	Considered to be a stale proposal
60 =	Mag 220 Tower	180 metres (590 ft)	45	—	Dubai	Considered to be a stale proposal
60 =	Arabian Crowne	180 metres (590 ft)	45	—	Dubai	Considered to be a stale proposal

*Table entries with dashes (—) indicate that information regarding building dates of completion has not yet been released.

=== Proposed ===
This table lists buildings that are proposed for construction in the United Arab Emirates and are expected to rise at least 180 metres (591 ft) in height.

Rank	Name	Height* ft (m)	Floors	Year* (est.)	City	Notes
1	Dubai City Tower	2,400 metres (7,900 ft)	400	2025	Dubai	Also Known as Dubai Vertical City
2	Ziggurat Pyramid	1,200 metres (3,900 ft)	300+	2031	Dubai	
3	One Dubai Tower A	1,010 metres (3,310 ft)	201	—	Dubai	
4	The Spire at Ras Al-Khaimah	875 metres (2,871 ft)	140	—	Ras Al Khaimah	
5	One Dubai Tower B	874 metres (2,867 ft)	176	—	Dubai	
6	Anara Tower	687 metres (2,254 ft)	135	—	Dubai	
7	One Dubai Tower C	685 metres (2,247 ft)	154	—	Dubai	
8	One Park Avenue	595 metres (1,952 ft)	125	—	Dubai	
9	Meraas Tower	549 metres (1,801 ft)	112	—	Dubai	
10	The Golden Dome Dubai	500 metres (1,600 ft)	120	—	Dubai	
11	Burj Al Fattan	463 metres (1,519 ft)	96	—	Dubai	
12	Dynamic Tower	420 metres (1,380 ft)	80	2018	Dubai	
13	Al Sharq Tower	365 metres (1,198 ft)	102	—	Dubai	
14	Signature Towers Office	357 metres (1,171 ft)	75	2030	Dubai	Considered to be a stale proposal
15	The Circle	330 metres (1,080 ft)	66	—	Dubai	Considered to be a stale proposal
16	Il Primo Tower 2	300 metres (980 ft)	71	2020	Dubai	
17	Sheikh Hasher Tower	291 metres (955 ft)	62	—	Dubai	Considered to be a stale proposal
18	Signature Towers Hotel	286 metres (938 ft)	65	2030	Dubai	Considered to be a stale proposal
19	G-Tower	280 metres (920 ft)	45	2012	Dubai	
20	Mada'in Hotel	270 metres (890 ft)	65	—	Dubai	
21	Cobra Hotel	240 metres (790 ft)	65	2012	Ras Al Khaimah	
22	Signature Towers Residential	232 metres (761 ft)	55	2030	Dubai	Considered to be a stale proposal
23	Empire Island Tower	230 / 755		2012	Abu Dhabi	
24	Saba Tower 4	222 metres (728 ft)	47	—	Dubai	
25	Abu Dhabi Clock Tower	200 / 656		2009	Dubai	

*Table entries with dashes (—) indicate that information regarding building heights and/or dates of completion has not yet been released.

== Timeline of tallest buildings ==
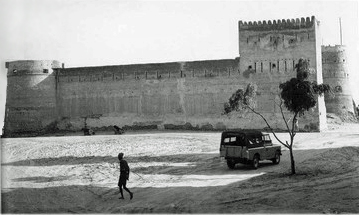
Al Fahidi Fort is the oldest building in UAE and was the tallest for 179 years.

This is a timeline of the buildings in UAE.

Rank	Name	Years as Tallest	Height* ft (m)	Floors	City	Notes
1	Al Fahidi Fort	1799–1973	23 metres (75 ft)^{[D]}	1	Dubai	
2	Sheikh Rashid Building	1973–1978	^{[D]}	15	Dubai	
3	Sheraton Dubai Creek	1978–1979	60 metres (200 ft)	12	Dubai	
4	Dubai World Trade Centre	1979–1994	149 metres (489 ft)	39	Dubai	
5	Baynunah Hilton Tower Hotel	1994–1999	165 metres (541 ft)	42	Abu Dhabi	
6	Burj Al Arab	1999–2000	321 metres (1,053 ft)	60	Dubai	
7	Emirates Office Tower	2000–2009	355 metres (1,165 ft)	54	Dubai	
8	Almas Tower	2009–2010	360 metres (1,180 ft)	74	Dubai	
9	Burj Khalifa	2010–now	828 metres (2,717 ft)	162	Dubai	

== See also ==
- List of tallest buildings in Dubai
- List of tallest buildings in Abu Dhabi
- List of tallest buildings in Asia
- List of tallest buildings in the world

== Notes ==
A. Topped out, but still under construction
