= HHHR Tower =

Skyscraper on Sheikh Zayed Road, Dubai, United Arab Emirates

Blue Tower
- Blue Tower in the evening of November 2024
- Interactive map of the Blue Tower area

General information
- Status: Completed
- Type: Residential
- Location: Sheikh Zayed Road, Dubai, United Arab Emirates
- Coordinates: 25°13′16.39″N 55°16′50.66″E
- Construction started: 28 May 2006
- Completed: 18 February 2010

Height
- Roof: 317.6 m (1,042 ft)

Technical details
- Floor count: 72

Design and construction
- Architect: Al Hashemi
- Developer: Dubai International Real Estate
- Main contractor: Al Ahmadiah - Hip Hing Joint Venture

HHHR Tower, also known as the Blue Tower, is a supertall skyscraper on Sheikh Zayed Road, Dubai, United Arab Emirates. The construction of the 72-floor, 317-metre (1,040 ft) building started in 2006 and was completed in 2010. Designed by architect Al Hashemi, the building is primarily residential, with some commercial uses.

When completed in 2010, HHHR Tower was the second-tallest residential building in the world, surpassed only by Q1 in Australia, which stands 323 m (1,060 ft) tall. As of 2022, HHHR Tower is the 16th-tallest residential building in the world and the sixth-tallest residential building in Dubai. The tower comprises 454 residential apartments.

The building was built by a joint venture between Al Ahmadiah Contracting and Trading Co., from the UAE and Hip Hing Construction Co. Ltd. from Hong Kong. Another hallmark project by this team is the Masdar City in Abu Dhabi.

== Construction gallery ==
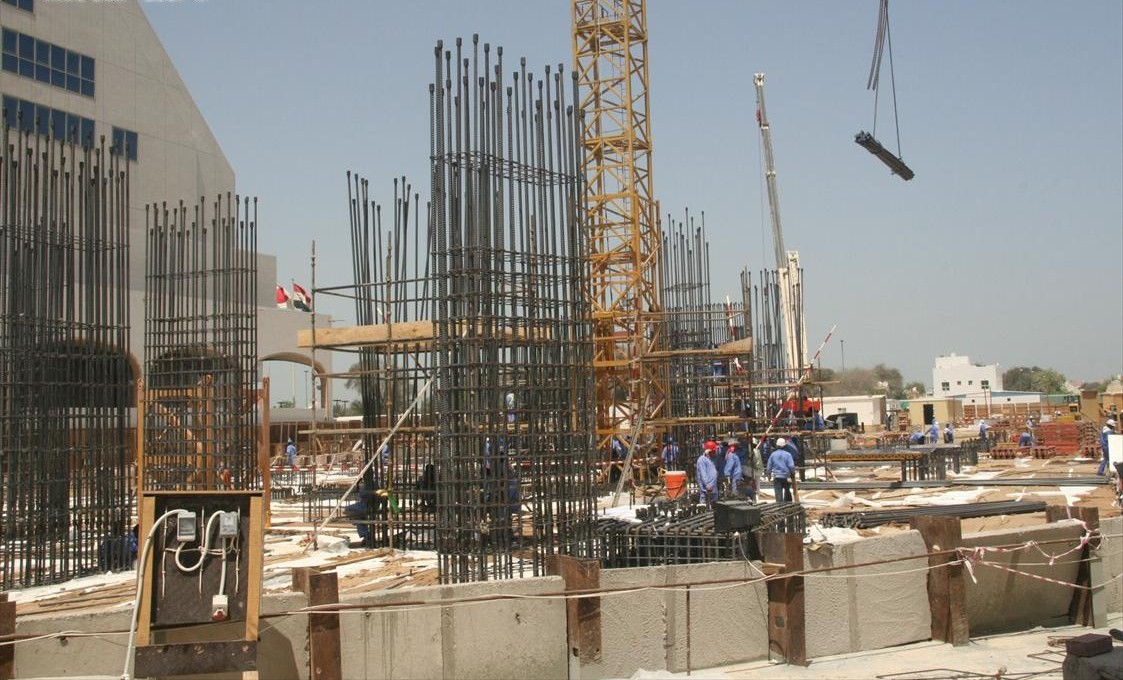
4 May 2007

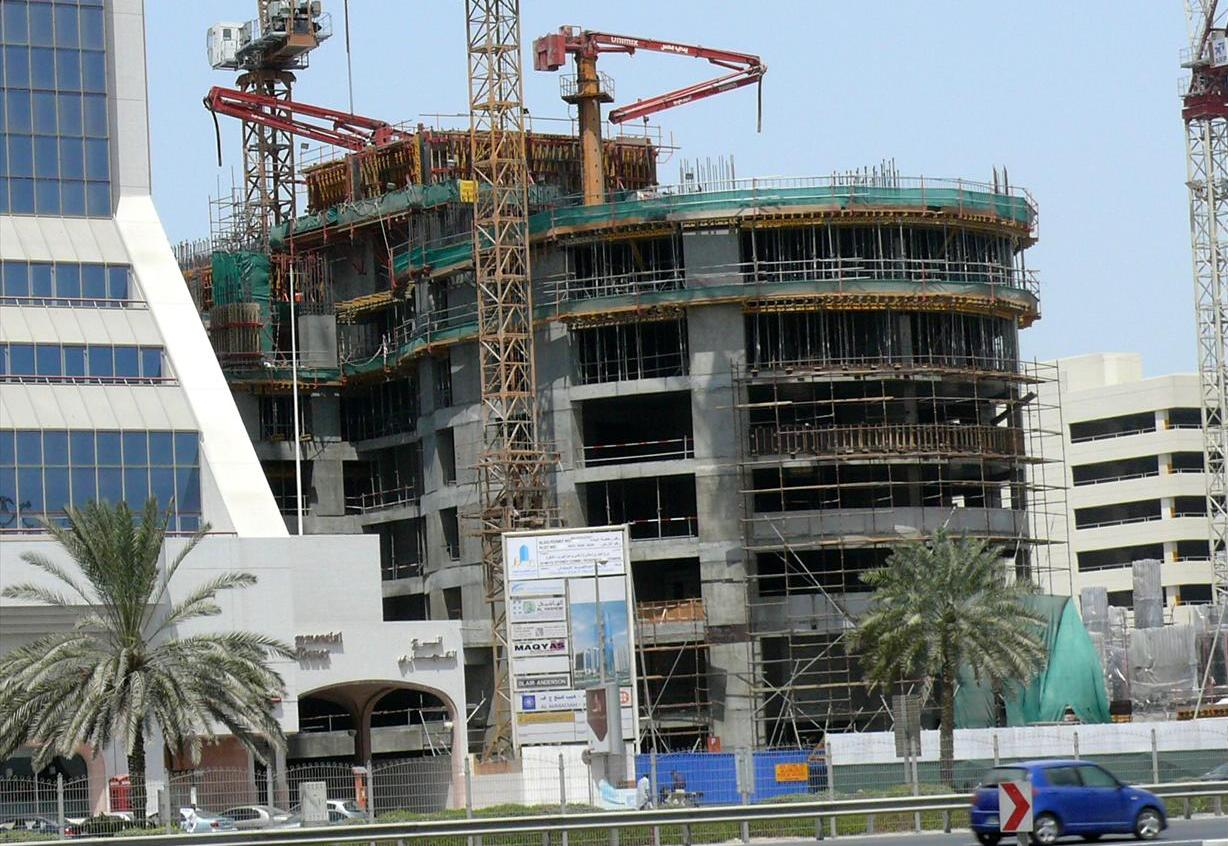
14 September 2007

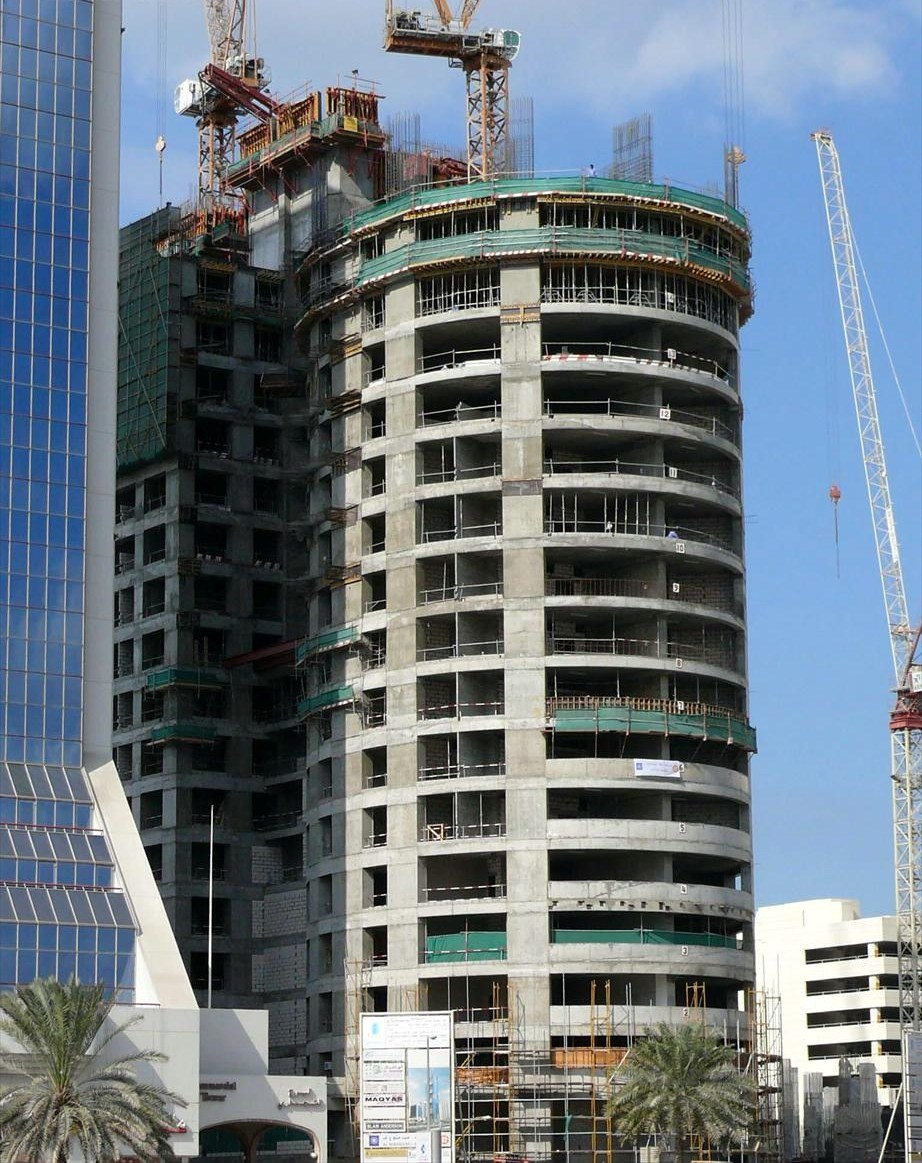
28 December 2007

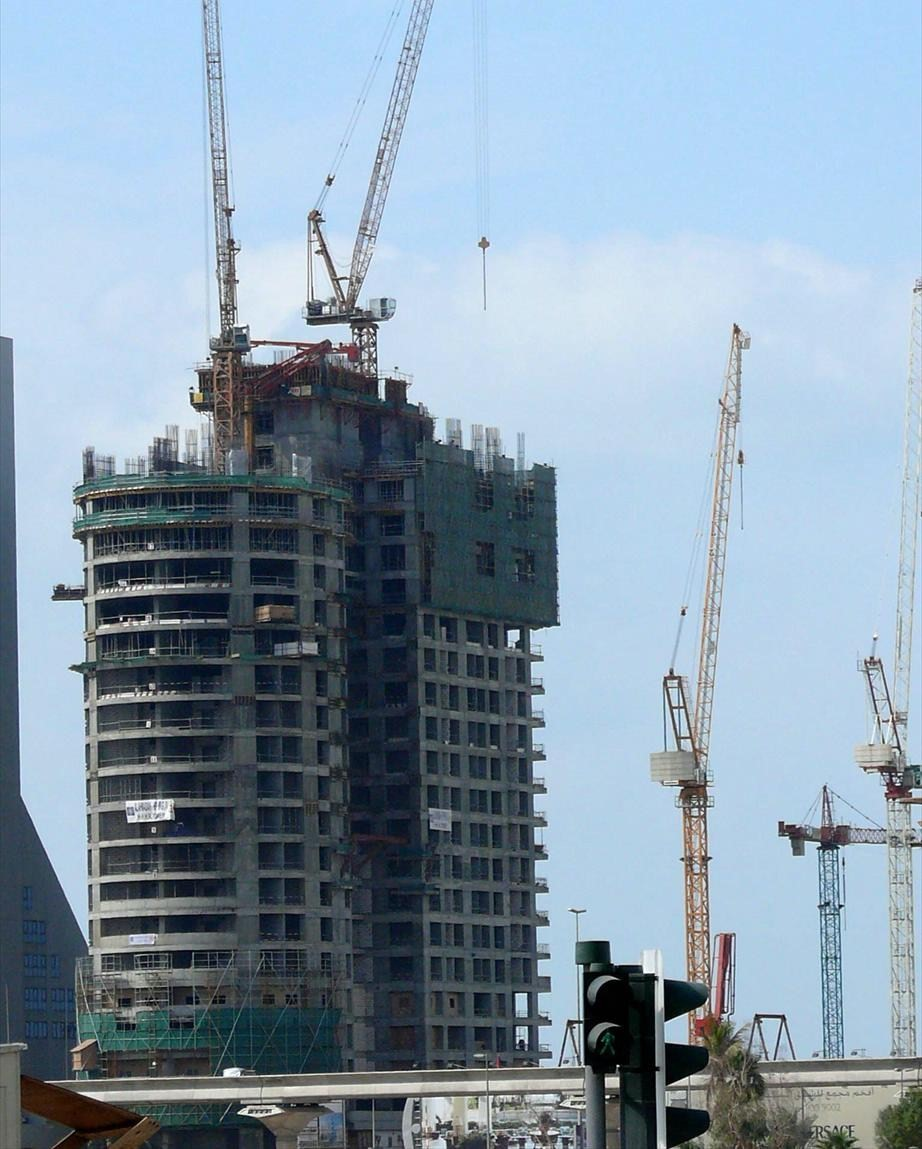
25 January 2008

== See also ==
- Al Yaqoub Tower
- Gevora Hotel
- List of tallest buildings in Dubai
- List of tallest buildings in the United Arab Emirates
- List of tallest residential buildings
