= Za'abeel (disambiguation) =

Za'abeel (or Zabeel) is an Arabic term often used to refer to specific areas or localities in Dubai.

Za'abeel may refer to:

- One Za'abeel, a skyscraper located in the Za’abeel district of Dubai,
- Za'abeel, Dubai, a locality in Dubai
- Zabeel Park, a large public park also located in the Zabeel district of Dubai
- Zabeel Stadium, a multi-purpose stadium
