= Sky Gardens =

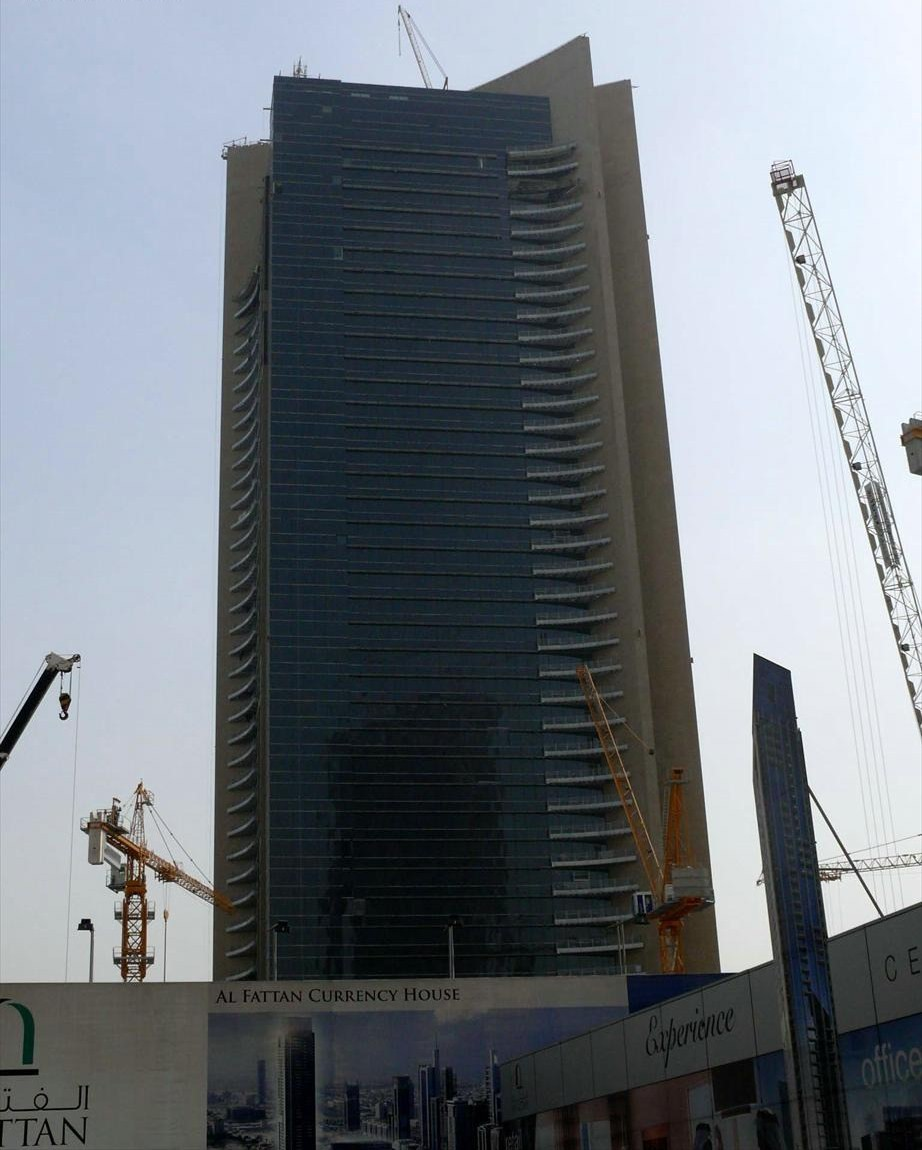
- Sky Gardens in 2008

General information
- Location: Dubai, United Arab Emirates
- Coordinates: 25°12′42.16″N 55°16′58.61″E
- Construction started: 2005
- Completed: 2008

Technical details
- Floor count: 45

The Sky Gardens is a 45-floor tower in the Dubai International Financial Centre in Dubai, United Arab Emirates. The tower has a total structural height of 160 m (525 ft), 575 units vary from studio,1,2,3 bedroom and 7 luxury penthouses. Sky Gardens was delivered by Caddick Developments, with construction completed in 2008. Construction started in March 2005.

== See also ==
- List of tallest buildings in Dubai
