= Grosvenor House (Dubai) =

- Interactive map of the Grosvenor House area

General information
- Status: Completed
- Type: Hotel; Residential
- Architectural style: Modernism
- Location: Dubai, United Arab Emirates
- Coordinates: 25.085833°N 55.144167°E
- Construction started: West Marina Beach 2002; The Residence 2007
- Completed: West Marina Beach 2005; The Residence 2011
- Opening: West Marina Beach 21 June 2005
- Owner: Sheikh Ahmed bin Saeed Al Maktoum
- Management: General Manager Ms. Pam Wilby

Height
- Roof: 210.4 m (690 ft)

Technical details
- Floor count: 48; 3 below ground

Design and construction
- Architect: Archgroup Consultants
- Developer: Emaar Properties
- Main contractor: Nasa Multiplex

Other information
- Number of rooms: Approximately 750

Grosvenor House is a twin tower complex in Dubai Marina in Dubai, United Arab Emirates.

== Background ==
The two towers, Grosvenor House West Marina Beach and Grosvenor House The Residence, stand at the same height of 210 metres (690 ft) with 48 floors each. The complex, which is owned by Sheikh Ahmed bin Saeed Al Maktoum, is named after the Grosvenor House in London.

Grosvenor House West Marina Beach, which began construction in March 2003, was completed in 2005 and opened on 21 June 2005. Upon opening, the tower became first hotel in Dubai Marina and the eighth tallest building in Dubai. The tower contains hotel rooms and residential apartments operated by Le Méridien. The building houses twelve restaurants and bars. Michelin-starred chef Gary Rhodes was the chef-patron of Rhodes Mezzanine now known as Rhodes W1 Dubai, one of the restaurants in Grosvenor House West Marina Beach.

The second tower, Grosvenor House The Residence, was completed in 2011. This 113,110 m^{2} (1,217,500 sq ft) residential tower was announced in April 2006.

== See also ==
- List of tallest buildings in Dubai
- List of tallest buildings in the United Arab Emirates
