= Millennium Tower (Dubai) =

- Millennium Tower, viewed from At the Top, Burj Khalifa in 2014

- Location within Dubai

General information
- Status: Completed
- Type: Residential
- Location: Dubai, United Arab Emirates
- Coordinates: 25°11′41″N 55°15′57″E
- Construction started: 2003
- Completed: 2005
- Opening: 2006

Height
- Antenna spire: 285 m (935 ft)

Technical details
- Floor count: 60 and 1 basement
- Floor area: 99,800 square metres (1,074,000 sq ft)

Design and construction
- Architects: WS Atkins & Partners
- Main contractor: Dubai Contracting Company LLC

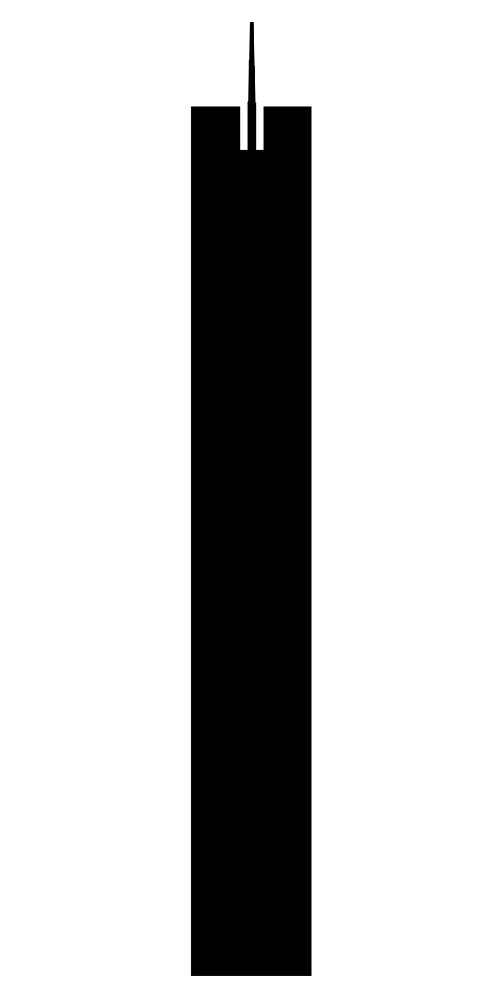
Millennium Tower

The Millennium Tower is located on Sheikh Zayed Road in Dubai, United Arab Emirates. The tower rises 285 m (935 ft) and has 60 floors. It was completed in 2006. The Millennium Tower contains 301 three-bedroom and 106 two-bedroom apartments.

== See also ==
- List of tallest buildings in Dubai
- List of tallest buildings in the United Arab Emirates
