= Al Tayer Tower =

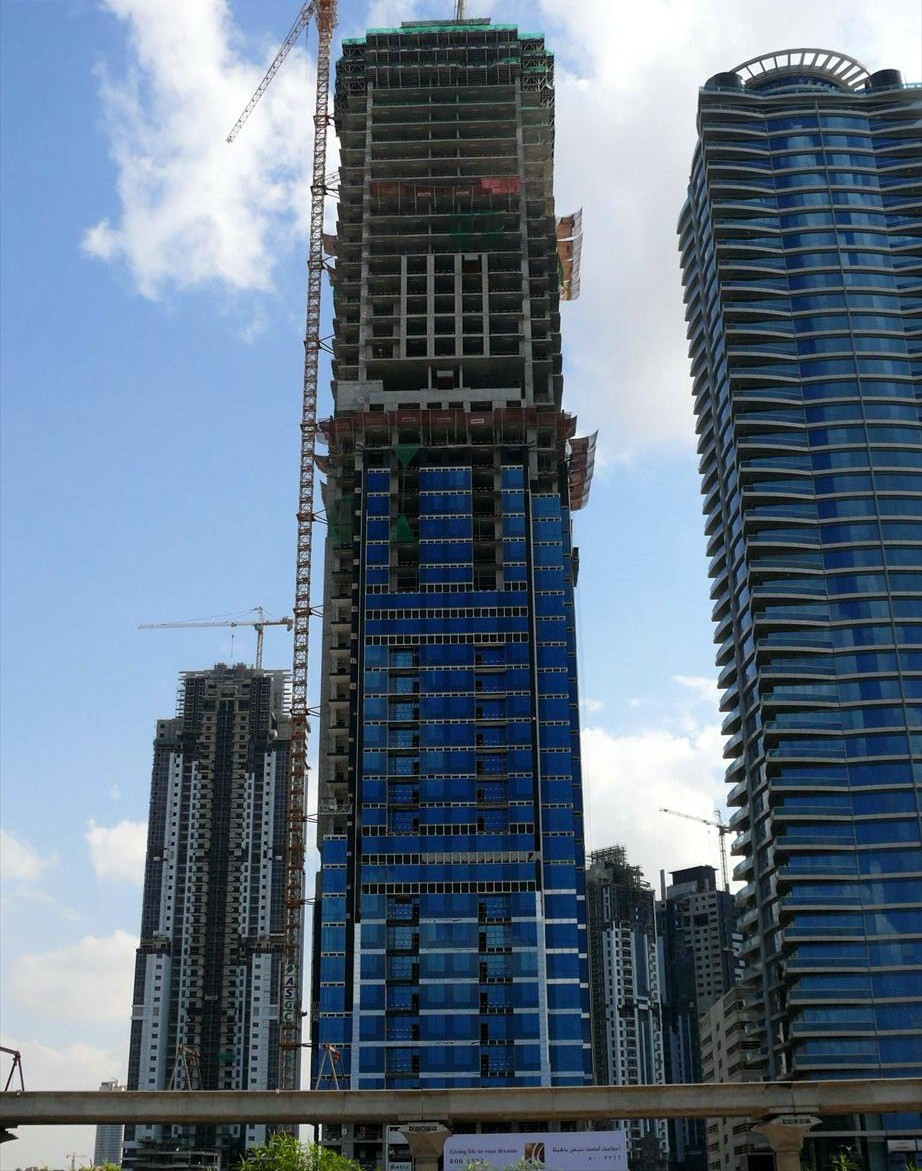
- Al Tayer Tower in December 2007
- Interactive map of the Al Tayer Tower area

General information
- Status: Completed
- Type: Residential
- Location: Sheikh Zayed Road, Dubai, United Arab Emirates
- Coordinates: 25°11′37.51″N 55°15′48.62″E
- Construction started: 2006
- Completed: 2009
- Cost: US$86 million

Height
- Roof: 249 m (817 ft)

Technical details
- Floor count: 59
- Floor area: 60,000 m^{2} (645,835 ft^{2})

Design and construction
- Architect: Khatib and Alami
- Developer: Mr. Saeed Humaid Mater Al Tayer
- Main contractor: Al Shafar General Contracting Co. (L.L.C.)

The Al Tayer Tower, aka Manazel Al Safa Tower, is a 59-floor residential tower in Dubai, United Arab Emirates. Its location along Sheikh Zayed Road gives it close proximity to Downtown Dubai (the district that includes the Burj Khalifa and the Dubai Mall) and Business Bay. The design of the tower was completed in 2005, but ground works did not begin until Spring 2006. The building began to rise above ground level in December 2006. The first glass was put on the building in April 2007, but this was only two windows. Not until September did major cladding begin. Tower will have a total of 244 apartments that come in various sizes. Built behind the tower will be an 11-floor parking garage, also built by Al Shafar General Contracting Co. LLC.

== See also ==
- List of tallest buildings in Dubai
- List of tallest buildings in the United Arab Emirates
