= AAM Tower =

- AAM Tower seen at night on 2015
- Interactive map of the AAM Tower area

General information
- Type: Office
- Architectural style: Modern
- Location: Dubai, United Arab Emirates, Sheikh Zayed Road, Dubai Media City
- Coordinates: 25.0915102°N 55.1587071°E
- Construction started: 2005
- Completed: 2008

Height
- Architectural: 243.8 m (800 ft)
- Tip: 243.8 m (800 ft)

Technical details
- Material: Concrete
- Floor count: 46

Design and construction
- Architect: Arenco Architectural & Engineering Consultants
- Developer: Al Nekhreh Contracting Co. LLC

The AAM Tower (also known as Arenco Tower) is a 46-floor office tower in Dubai Media City in Dubai, United Arab Emirates. It is 243.8 m (800 ft) tall. The building was designed by Arenco Architectural & Engineering Consultants. It was also developed by Al Nekhreh Contracting Co. LLC. The construction of the building started in 2005. It was completed in 2008.

== Events ==
In February 2017, one of the building tenants Exential Commercial Brokers, under investigation for fraud, had its offices broken into, raising fears of evidence tampering in the case.

== See also ==
- List of tallest buildings in Dubai
- List of tallest buildings in the United Arab Emirates
