= Marina 101 =

Skyscraper in Dubai, United Arab Emirates

General information
- Status: Completed
- Architectural style: Postmodernist
- Location: Dubai, United Arab Emirates
- Construction started: 8 November 2006
- Completed: 7 December 2017; 8 years ago

Height
- Architectural: 425 m (1,394 ft)
- Top floor: 371 m (1,217 ft)

Technical details
- Floor count: 101, plus 6 basement floors
- Floor area: 120,706 m^{2} (1,299,269 sq ft)
- Lifts/elevators: 29

Design and construction
- Architects: National Engineering Bureau; Interior Designer: Design Work Portfolio
- Developer: Sheffield Holdings Limited
- Main contractor: TAV Construction

Marina 101 is a skyscraper in Dubai, United Arab Emirates, located in the Dubai Marina district. Standing 101 stories high and 425 m (1,394 ft) tall, it is the second tallest building in the United Arab Emirates, behind only the Burj Khalifa. As of 2022, Marina 101 was also the 32nd-tallest building in the world. Its use is residential with apartments and hotel floors. The tower is designed in a postmodernist style.

== History ==
Construction began in 2007, with completion initially scheduled for 2014. The building remained incomplete after the original developer - Sheffield Holdings Limited - ran out of capital. The tower is completed as of September 2024. The building was designed by National Engineering Bureau and construction was by Turkish conglomerate TAV Construction.The building opened in September 2026.

== Residential and hotel ==
The first 33 floors of the skyscraper are designed to host a 5-star Hard Rock hotel with 281 rooms, while the floors from 34 to 100 have residential apartments. Apart from five restaurants in the hotel tower, there are 252 one-bedroom, 204 two-bedroom, and 42 three-bedroom apartments with 6 duplex penthouses from the 97th to the 100th floor. The 101st floor of the skyscraper features a club lounge, restaurant and a Rock Shop merchandise store.

== Gallery ==
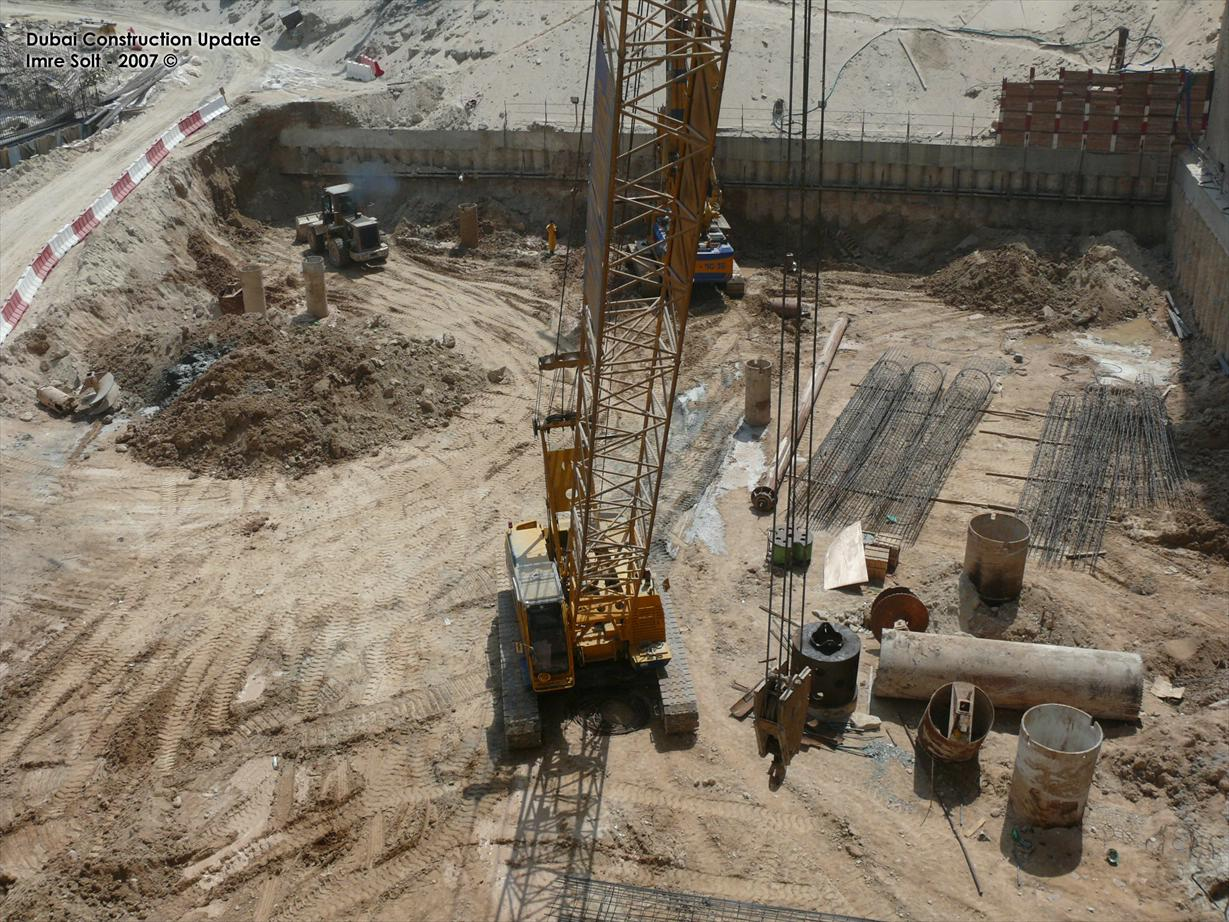
Marina 101 in 2007

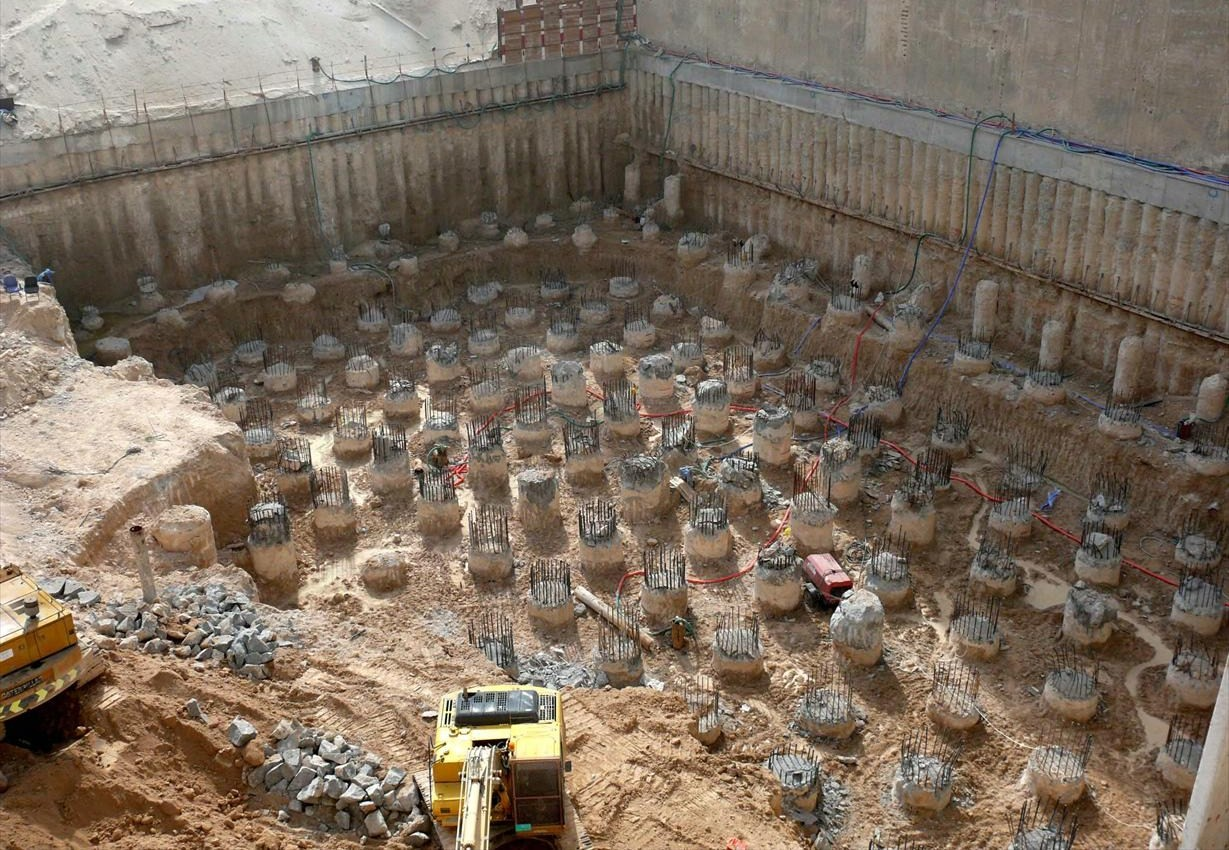
Marina 101 on January 4, 2008

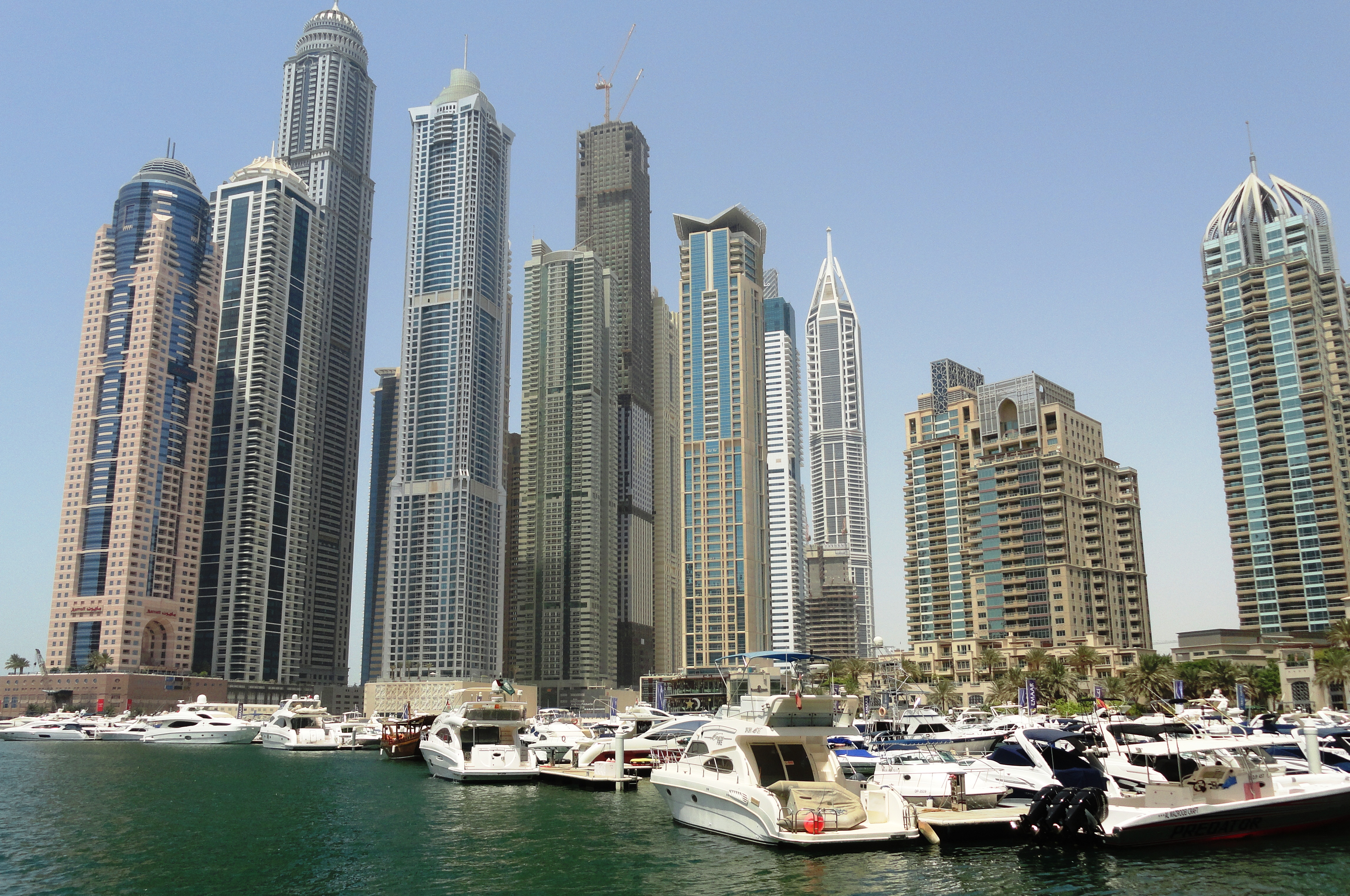
Marina 101 in 2012

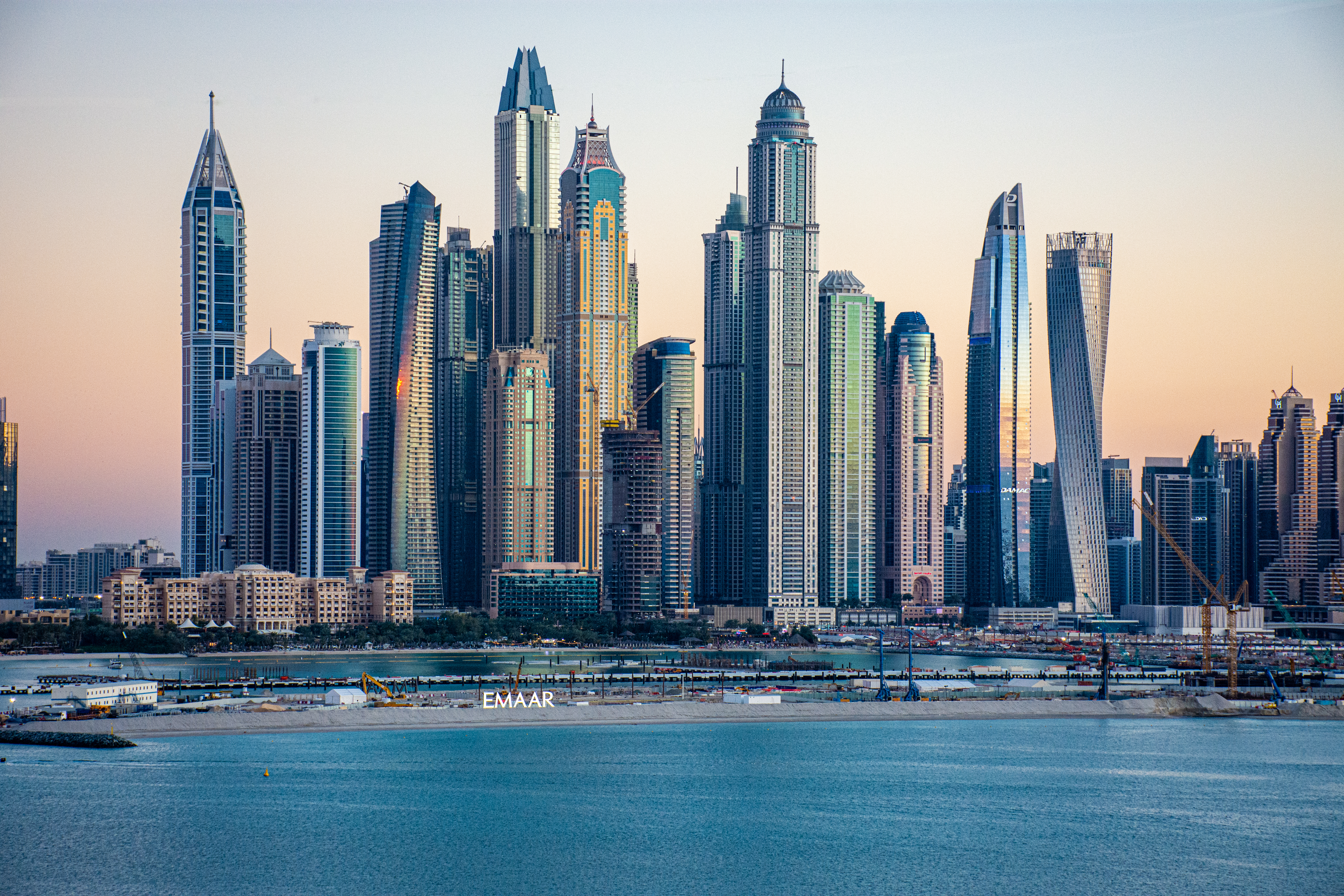
Marina 101 in 2020

== See also ==
- List of tallest buildings
- List of tallest buildings in the United Arab Emirates
- List of tallest buildings in Dubai
- List of buildings with 100 floors or more
- Marina 106
