= AHS Tower =

Skyscraper in the United Arab Emirates

- AHS Tower as Al Yaqoub Tower before the renovation

- Location within Dubai

General information
- Status: Closed renovation
- Location: Sheikh Zayed Road, Dubai, UAE
- Coordinates: 25°12′58.87″N 55°16′47.34″E
- Construction started: 2006
- Topped-out: 2010
- Completed: 2013

Height
- Roof: 328 m (1,076 ft)

Technical details
- Floor count: 69 (1 basement floor)

Design and construction
- Architect: Eng. Adnan Saffarini
- Developer: AHS Properties

Website
- www.ahstower.com

The AHS Tower, formerly known as the Al Yaqoub Tower is a 328 m (1,076 ft) tall skyscraper on Sheikh Zayed Road in Dubai, United Arab Emirates. The tower topped out in 2010 and was completed in 2013. It has 69 floors. The building was formerly owned privately by Daro Saifuddin Yaqoub. In early 2025, the building was acquired by AHS Properties, a real estate company founded by Abbas Sajwani.

The building design was inspired by Elizabeth Tower (more commonly known as Big Ben) in London, due to which, the tower is also called the Big Ben of Dubai. However, no clock face is present on Al Yaqoub Tower. There were initially plans to build a working clock on the tower, but was scrapped due to the authorities' fear that the clock would distract drivers on the busy Sheikh Zayed Road below. It also bears a resemblance to the Gevora Hotel, a building located directly north of it.

== Construction gallery ==
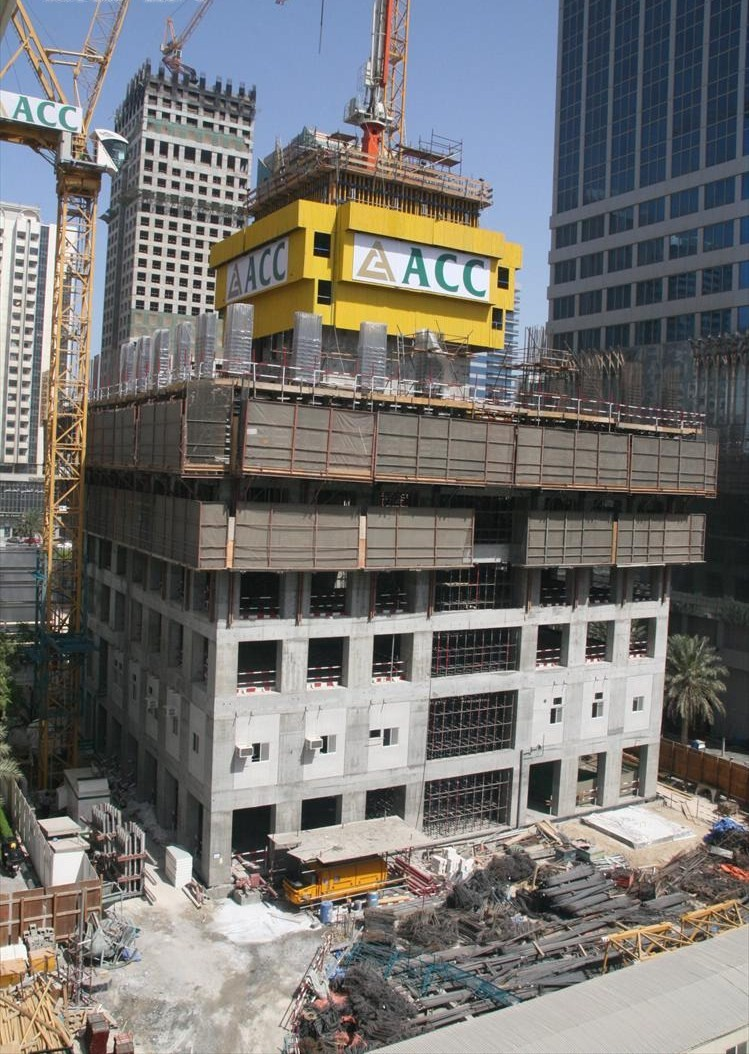
4 May 2007

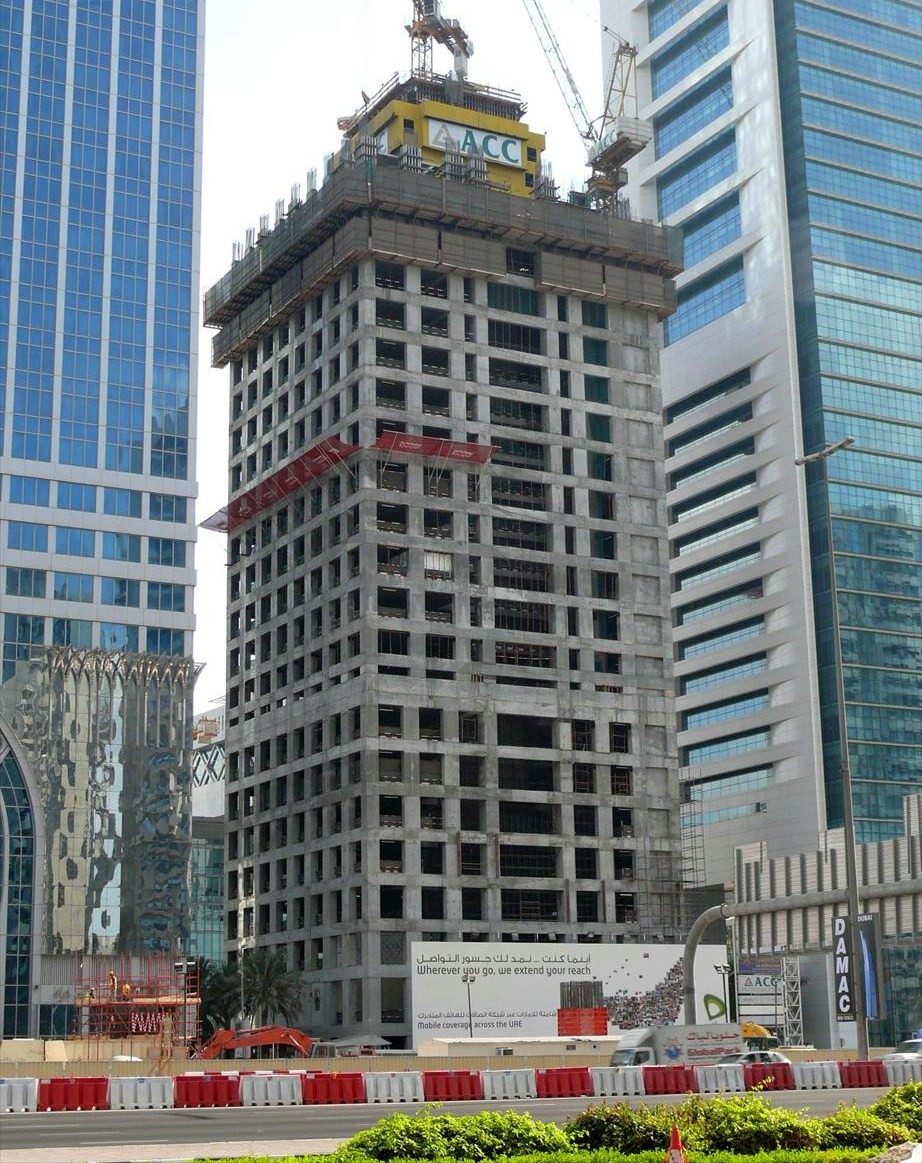
28 December 2007

== See also ==
- List of tallest buildings in Dubai
- List of tallest buildings in the United Arab Emirates
