= Al Rostamani Maze Tower =

General information
- Status: Complete
- Type: Residential, Office
- Coordinates: 25.2156907°N 55.2784989°E

Height
- Roof: 210 m (689 ft)

Technical details
- Floor count: 57

Design and construction
- Architect: Planquadrat

Al Rostamani Maze Tower is a skyscraper located along Sheikh Zayed Road in Dubai, United Arab Emirates. Al Rostamani Maze tower has a Maze shape in the front and rear elevations. The building was completed in 2011. Maze Tower is mixed used, which owned by Al Rostamani Group, the Tower has 25 office floors, garden floor, 24 residential floors and roof with swimming pool. Al Rostamani International Exchange (Previously known as Thomas Cook Al Rostamani Ex Co) Head Office is also located in this tower.

== See also ==
- Sheikh Zayed Road
- List of tallest buildings in Dubai
- List of tallest buildings in the United Arab Emirates
