= Dubai International Financial Centre =

Special economic zone in Dubai

Coordinates: 25°12′51″N 55°16′53″E

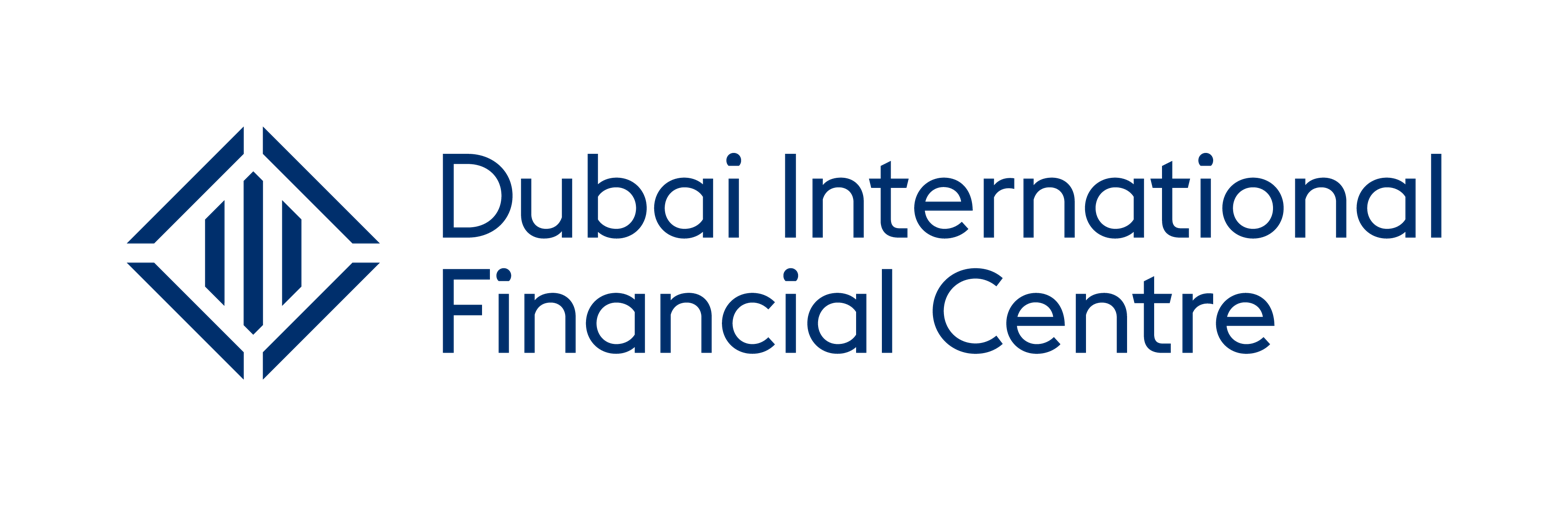
- Industry: Banking, financial services, insurance, wealth & asset management, brokerage & capital markets, professional service providers, corporate offices and retailers
- Founded: 2002, operations started 2004
- Headquarters: Dubai, United Arab Emirates
- Key people: Sheikh Maktoum Bin Mohammed Bin Rashid Al Maktoum (President); Essa Kazim (Governor); Arif Amiri (DIFC Authority CEO); Saleh Al-Akrabi (DIFC Investments Chief Real Estate Officer); Alya Al-Zarouni (DIFC Authority COO)
- Website: www.difc.ae

The Dubai International Financial Centre (DIFC) is a special economic zone in Dubai covering 110 ha (272 acres), established in 2004 as a financial hub for companies operating throughout the Middle East, Africa, and South Asia (MEASA) markets.

DIFC is regulated by the Dubai Financial Services Authority, an independent regulator exclusive to the zone, and by its own court system, DIFC Courts, separate from the Emirate of Dubai's legal system and that of the federal government of the UAE. DIFC follows the common law framework and operates in English.

DIFC is one of Dubai's independent free zones; it offers companies 100% ownership without the need for a local partner. The freezone houses financial institutions, and wealth funds in addition to retail and hotel space dedicated to the free zones.

DIFC offers clients a 50-year guarantee of zero taxes on corporate income and profits, complemented by the UAE's network of double taxation treaties.

It was reported in 2022 that DIFC had a 19% annual increase in non-financial firms, bringing the total number of international companies, family businesses, and corporate service providers to over 3,000.

During the 2026 Iran war, a building in DIFC was damaged by debris from a drone attack.

== Independent jurisdiction ==
The DIFC is an independent jurisdiction under the Constitution of the United Arab Emirates, with its own civil and commercial laws distinct from those of the wider UAE, and its own courts. DIFC laws and regulations are written in English and default to English law in the event of ambiguity. The DIFC Courts have judges from other common law jurisdictions, including England, Singapore, Hong Kong, and, previously, Ireland. The DIFC's independent jurisdiction extends to a range of areas, including corporate, commercial, civil, employment, trusts, and securities law matters. Other laws of the UAE or the Emirate of Dubai, such as criminal law and immigration regulations, continue to apply within the DIFC.

The DIFC-LCIA Arbitration Centre is an independent center of international arbitration that uses rules modeled on those of London Court of International Arbitration.

The principal governing body of the DIFC is the DIFC Authority. The financial services regulator is the Dubai Financial Services Authority (DFSA), which regulates the conduct of financial services in and from the DIFC. The DFSA is distinct from the UAE's federal Capital Market Authority, whose jurisdiction covers the wider UAE outside the boundaries of the DIFC.

The DIFC court witnessed Lord (Angus) Glennie being sworn in as a judge in the presence of Sheikh Mohammed bin Rashid al-Maktoum in 2021. A year later, in July 2022, the Scottish judge started facing criticism from retired barrister and former chair of human rights advocacy group, Amnesty International Ireland, Bill Shipsey, for turning a blind eye to the Emirates' "egregious human rights abuses". Lord Glennie started being criticized after the back-to-back resignations of former Irish judges from the DIFC Court. Former Irish chief justice Frank Clarke and former president of the High Court, Peter Kelly, resigned within days of being sworn in at the DIFC court following criticism from barrister and leader of the Labour Party, Ivana Bacik.

== Financial trading ==
License applications are considered from financial institutions in the sectors. The units offer 0% tax on income and profits, 100% foreign ownership, no restrictions on foreign exchange or capital/profit repatriation, operational support, and business continuity facilities.

One of the key elements of the center is a privately held financial exchange that opened in September 2005 as Dubai International Financial Exchange (DIFX) but was rebranded as NASDAQ Dubai in 2008. The trading hours of NASDAQ Dubai are from 10:00 a.m. to 2:00 p.m. (6:00 a.m. to 10:00 a.m. GMT), from Sunday to Thursday. Companies listed on NASDAQ Dubai include ordinary shares listed by DP World along with DEPA. DP World's initial public offering was the largest ever in the Middle East and raised $4.96 billion; 15 times oversubscribed, it is one of the most valued companies in the Middle East region.

== DIFC FinTech Hive ==
In April 2017, the DIFC announced its initiative to accelerate the growth of financial technology in the region. Arif Amiri, Chief Executive Officer at DIFC, commented: 'FinTech Hive at DIFC will connect innovators in financial services technology with the banks, financial institutions, and service providers within our dynamic ecosystem at DIFC'. The plan is for ten participating developers to present their products to venture capitalists.

On 22 January 2020, DIFC FinTech Hive announced the launch of a startup accelerator program for fintech startups in the Middle East, Africa and South Asia (MEASA) region under the name 'FinTech Hive Scale Up Programme'.

By 2024, DIFC hosted more than 1,000 financial technology companies, representing the fastest-growing sector within the centre, with 316 fintech firms establishing a presence in 2023 alone, a 31% year-on-year increase.

== Metaverse platform ==
In late January 2023, the DIFC announced that they were launching a metaverse platform as part of the Dubai Metaverse Strategy enacted by Mohammed bin Rashid Al Maktoum, according to the Government of Dubai Media Office. The Media Office states that the forum is intended to run for a period of six months, during which time startups will be introduced to training, workshops, and networking opportunities. They state that the platform will include a physical studio, and it focuses include policy development, legal frameworks, and digital identity.

== Dubai FinTech Summit ==
The inaugural Dubai FinTech Summit was held on 8–9 May 2023 at the Madinat Jumeirah in Dubai. Organized by the Dubai International Financial Centre (DIFC), the event convened over 5,000 global industry leaders, including policymakers, C-suite executives, entrepreneurs, investors, and delegates from more than 50 countries. The summit featured over 100 exhibitors and 120 speakers, addressing the latest innovations and challenges in the financial technology sector.

== Facilities ==
The Dubai International Financial Centre has three hotels, the Ritz-Carlton, the Waldorf Astoria, Four Seasons. It is also home to several art galleries, and over 100 cafes and restaurants. There is a variety of retail shops and convenience stores, along with business services outlets. In 2018, the Gate Avenue shopping mall extension was opened to the public, featuring an additional 185 retail, dining, fashion, and lifestyle concepts.

== Buildings ==
- Emirates Financial Towers
- Sky Gardens
- The Index
