= Gevora Hotel =

Tall hotel along Sheikh Zayed Road in the city Dubai, UAE

- فندق جيفورا
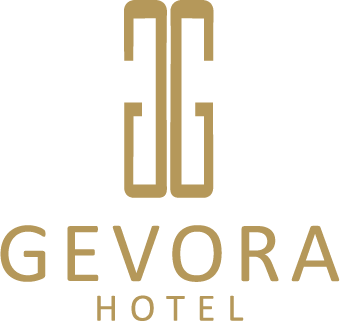

- Gevora Hotel in October 2018
- Interactive map of the Gevora Hotel area
- Alternative names: Ahmed Abdul Rahim Al Attar Tower

General information
- Status: Completed
- Type: Hotel
- Location: 101 Sheikh Zayed Road, Dubai, United Arab Emirates
- Coordinates: 25°12′44.6″N 55°16′37.5″E
- Construction started: 3 September 2005
- Completed: 21 December 2017; 8 years ago
- Cost: >500 million AED

Height
- Architectural: 1,169.1 ft (356.33 m)
- Tip: 1,174 ft (357.8 m)
- Top floor: 906 ft (276.3 m)

Technical details
- Material: Steel and concrete
- Floor count: 75 (+2 below ground)
- Lifts/elevators: 6

Design and construction
- Developer: Al Attar Properties
- Structural engineer: Gulf Engineering & Consultants
- Main contractor: • Al Fara'a General Contracting • Naresco Contracting • Caterpillar Contracting

Other information
- Number of rooms: 528

Website
- www.gevorahotels.com

Gevora Hotel (Arabic: فندق جيفورا) is a 1,168 ft (356 m) tall hotel along Sheikh Zayed Road in Dubai, UAE. That height has given the skyscraper the title of tallest hotel building according to Guinness World Records. The four-star hotel opened in February 2018 after a construction period of twelve years. It has 528 rooms spread over 75 floors and a number of facilities including restaurants and a pool on top of its parking garage building.

Gevora Hotel is close to the Dubai International Financial Centre and its namesake metro station, the Rose Rayhaan by Rotana, and the Emirates Towers.

== History ==
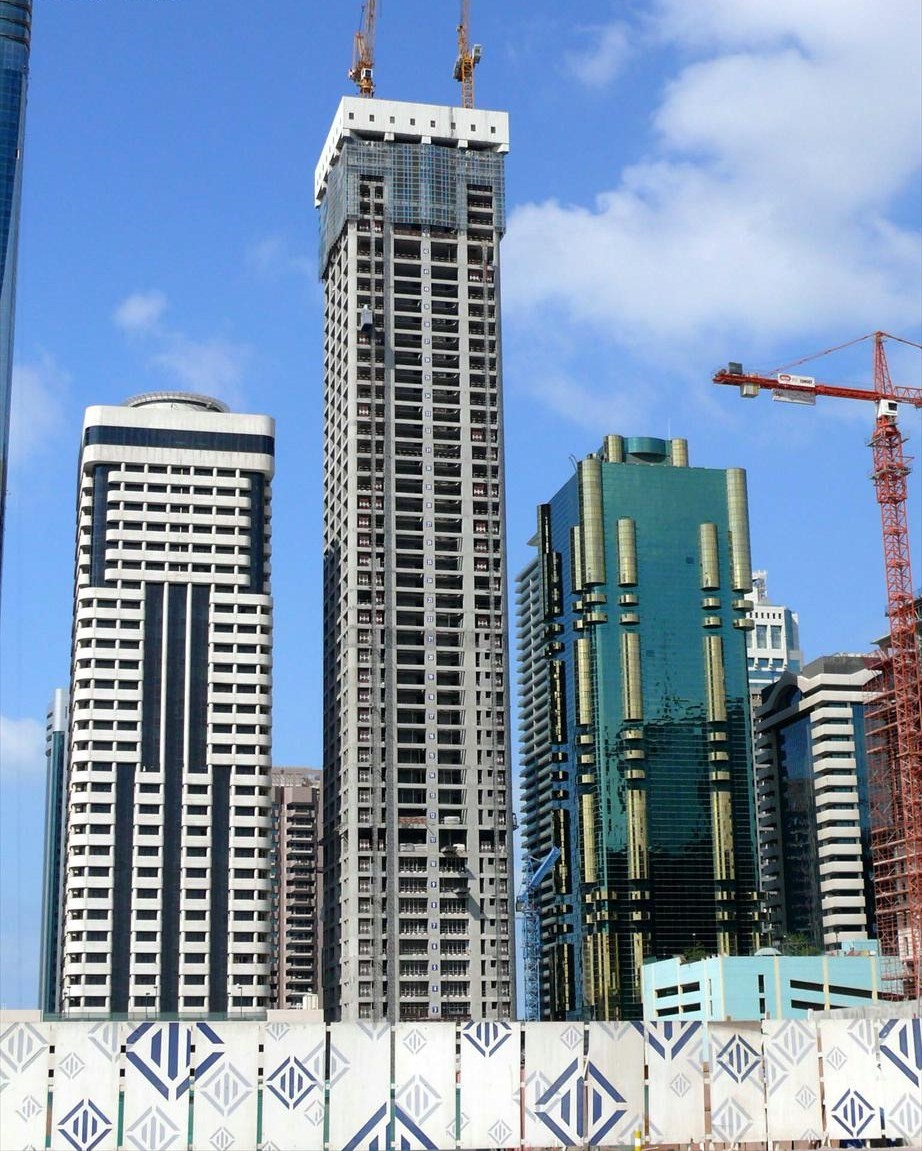
Construction of the Gevora Hotel in January 2008, when the 50th floor was nearly reached.

Construction of the building started in 2005 with Al Attar Properties as developer. During the construction phase, the building was known as Ahmed Abdul Rahim Al Attar Tower (Arabic: برج أحمد عبد الرحيم العطار) after the chairman of the development firm. The architect of record was Al Turath Engineering Consultants. The contractors included Al Fara'a General Contracting, Naresco Contracting, and Caterpillar Contracting. It was engineered by the firms Gulf Engineering & Consultants (structural) and Al Attar Electromechanical Engineering (MEP).

After the groundwork was laid in 2005, the tower rose between the spring of 2006 and the summer of 2008, when the top floors were reached. One new floor was added every five days. When a new floor was constructed, first the staircase and elevator shafts were erected, followed by the outer walls and their surrounding beams. Finally, the spaces in between were filled. After the main structure was finished, the building was fully clad and the crown was installed. The building was initially planned as a residential tower, but was converted into a hotel during construction. It was completed in 2017 after twelve years of construction. Gulf News reported the construction had cost over 500 million AED (US$140 million). After its completion, it was revealed that the building would be a hotel with the name "Gevora Hotel". The first guests arrived on 12 February 2018.

== Architecture ==
The Gevora Hotel and its parking garage structure (orange) are connected through a skyway.

The Gevora Hotel consists of a main hotel building and a parking garage building. The main building has an architectural height of 1,169.1 ft (356.33 m), making it the tallest hotel building according to Guinness World Records. It beat the previous record holder, the JW Marriott Marquis Dubai, which is located around 2 miles (3.2 km) to the southwest, by about 3 feet (1 m). The third tallest hotel, the 1,093 ft (333 m) tall Rose Rayhaan by Rotana, is situated in close proximity as well. The record of tallest hotel only considers buildings that are exclusively used as a hotel; the highest hotel room can be found at The Ritz-Carlton, Hong Kong, which occupies the top floors of the 1,588 ft (484 m) tall International Commerce Centre. Besides being the tallest hotel, Gevora Hotel is also the eighth-tallest completed building in Dubai, the ninth-tallest in the United Arab Emirates, and among the 50 tallest buildings in the world.

The main building of the Gevora Hotel sits on a square 100-by-100-foot (30 m × 30 m) plot and climbs 75 floors to a height of 906 ft (276.3 m), which is the height of the top floor. To stabilize the narrow structure, a deep foundation was used. The 75 floors the building has include a mezzanine located above the first floor and three mechanical floors (labeled 11, 42, and 73). An additional two floors are located in the basement. The main structure consists of concrete and steel and is covered in a glass façade, that includes gold-tinted elements. The floors can be reached by six elevators, three of which reach the top of the building. The latter elevators travel with a speed of 16 mph (26 km/h) and can reach the highest floor in 38 seconds. A pyramid-shaped crown-like structure with a gold color and lattice pattern sits upon the roof. The tip of the building is located above this crown at a height of 1,174 ft (357.8 m), 5 feet (1.5 m) above the architectural top.

A parking garage building with thirteen floors is situated to the east of the main building. Besides serving as a car park, the building also houses some of the hotel's facilities on its roof including a pool. The rooftop of the parking garage structure is connected to the main hotel building through a skyway.

== Hotel ==
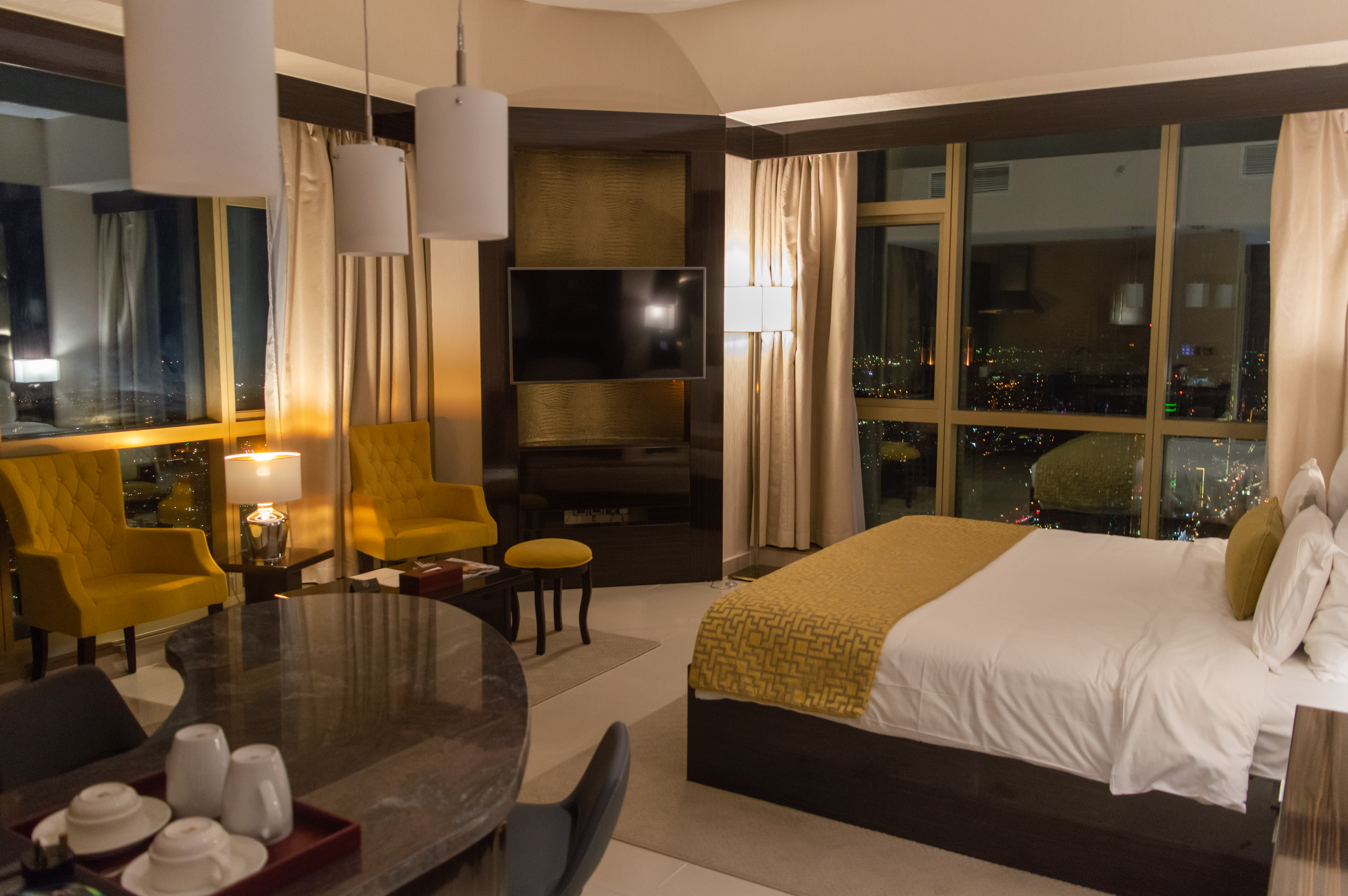
A double room on the 68th floor

Lobby

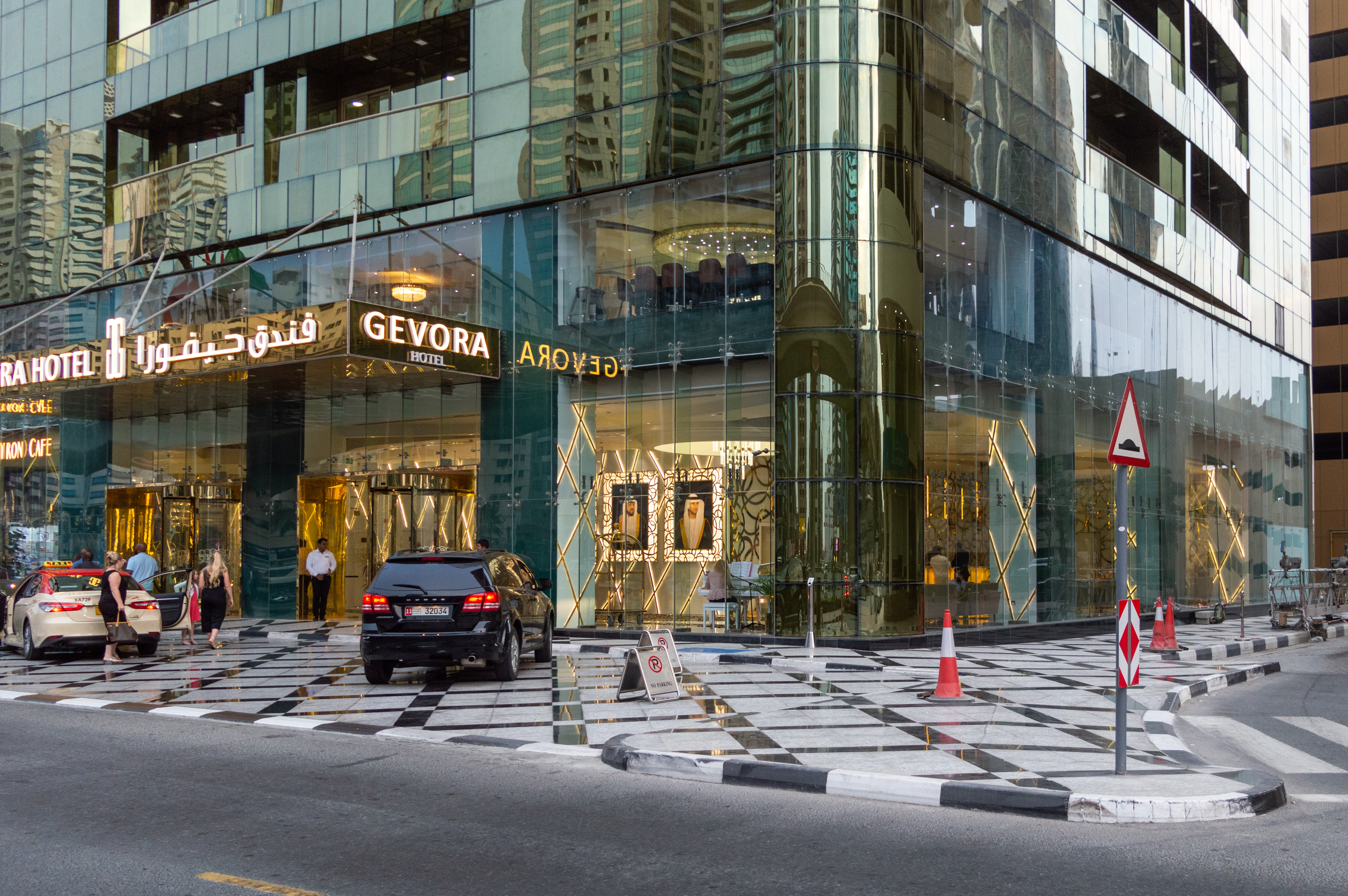
Entrance

The four-star Gevora Hotel is entered through the lobby on the first floor. The lobby is decorated using marble and gold-colored elements. The Guinness World Records plaque stating that Gevora Hotel is the tallest hotel is displayed in the lobby as well. The 528 rooms are located above the lobby. The smallest rooms are the 232 double rooms with a size of 500 sq ft (46 m^{2}). Larger are the one-bedroom suites, of which there are 264, with their size of 670 sq ft (62 m^{2}). The 32 suites with two bedrooms occupy 910 sq ft (85 m^{2}) each.

Furthermore, Gevora Hotel has a number of facilities for its guests. The first floor houses a coffee shop called Le Veyron Café next to the lobby. The mezzanine floor above is occupied by the all-day international restaurant Gevora Kitchen. The 12th floor has a skyway that connects the hotel to the parking garage building. The main pool facility is located on top of that building and has a main pool with a length of 80 ft (25 m), a kids' pool, a hot tub, and a pool bar. The 12th floor also features a meeting room, a gift shop, and a fitness center with separate facilities for men and women, containing a sauna and a steam room. The top floor houses a spa, while the rooftop offers views and features two pools. Gevora Hotel has plans to add two new restaurants including one on its top floor.

=== Floors ===
Floor	Note(s)
HC	Spa and roof
M3	Mechanical floor
43–72	Hotel rooms
M2	Mechanical floor
13–41	Hotel rooms
12	Skyway, pool, fitness center, meeting room, gift shop
M1	Mechanical floor
1–10	Hotel rooms
M	Mezzanine floor (Gevora Kitchen)
G	Ground floor (lobby and Le Veyron Café)
B1–B2	Basement floors

== See also ==
- List of tallest buildings in Dubai
- List of tallest buildings in the United Arab Emirates

Records
Preceded by JW Marriott Marquis Dubai	World's tallest hotel 1,169.1 feet (356.33 m); 2018–2025	Succeeded by Ciel Tower
