= Tameer Commercial Tower =

- Location within United Arab Emirates

General information
- Status: Under construction
- Type: Office
- Location: Abu Dhabi
- Coordinates: 24.5047°N 54.4117°E
- Construction started: September 21, 2008
- Estimated completion: 2032
- Opening: 2032

Height
- Roof: 300 metres (984 ft)

Technical details
- Floor count: 74

Design and construction
- Architect: Gensler
- Developer: Sorouh Real Estate and Tameer

Tameer Commercial Tower is an office skyscraper that began construction in 2009, developed by Sorouh Real Estate. The tower is the tallest between a complex conjoined between four other buildings in a major building project called the Tameer Towers, owned by the Tameer corporation. The Tameer Towers are located in a section of the city Abu Dhabi called Al Reem Island, which is a new development area for the city. The commercial building itself is considered the "crown jewel" of the complex by the Tameer corporation and is designated an office high-rise with an architectural style of futurism.

The whole complex contains many luxury features, such as a day care center, guest suites, car parking, swimming pools, a gymnasium, maid services, and job opportunities. The building complex is still not yet completed, although it was expected to be in 2013. The project was supposed to resume in 2013, but it was canceled on 30 June 2017.

In 2017, since 9 years of inactivity, Tameer refused for a refund for the commercial complex, several buyers have pursued the firm in the Abu Dhabi commercial court for five years. Mukhum stated "They have refused to refund me my hard-earned money and are offering what is called the Tameer exit plan, a 50 per cent refund only subject to high management approval." However, the project is cancelled.
