= Carlton Hotels & Suites =

Hotel Chain in the Middle East

- Headquarters in Dubai, United Arab Emirates
- Type: Public
- Industry: Hospitality
- Founded: October 3, 1977; 48 years ago in Dubai, United Arab Emirates
- Founder: H.E. Al Fardan
- Headquarters: 25°12′34″N 55°16′30″E, Dubai, United Arab Emirates
- Number of locations: ▲14 (by 2022)
- Area served: EMEA (Europe, Middle East & Africa)
- Key people: Hosni Abdelhadi, Chief Executive Officer (CEO)
- Products: Hotels, Suites, Resorts
- Number of employees: ▲2500 (2022)
- Website: www.carlton-hotels.com

Carlton Hotels & Suites is a Dubai based multinational hospitality company that manages hotels mostly in Asia and Europe. It was founded 1977 with Carlton Tower Hotel in Deira and was the second five star hotel in Dubai. The chain has nine directly managed hotels and three franchise operated hotels.

The company is headquartered in the right of the twin towers just behind Burj Khalifa, on the Sheikh Zayed Road in Dubai, U.A.E.

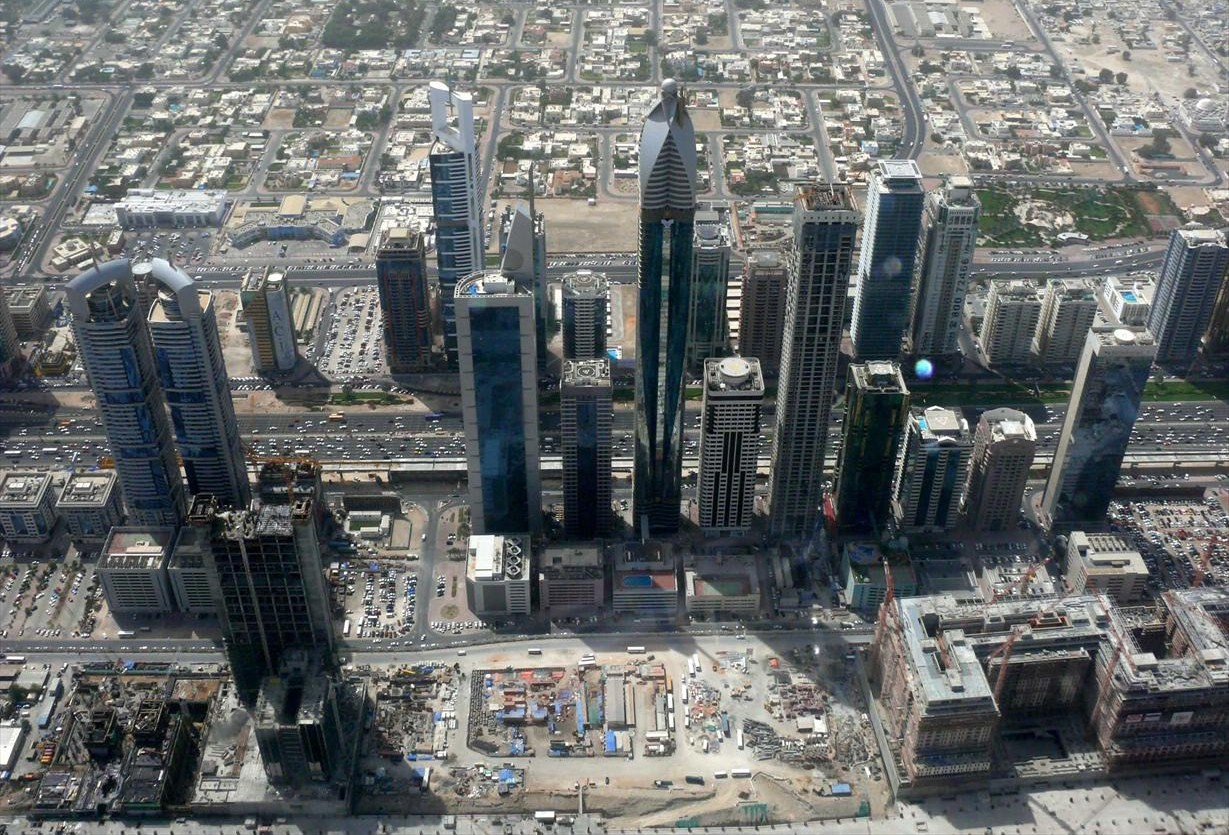
Carlton Downtown on the Sheikh Zayed Road

look of the headquarteres in 2012 from the back side

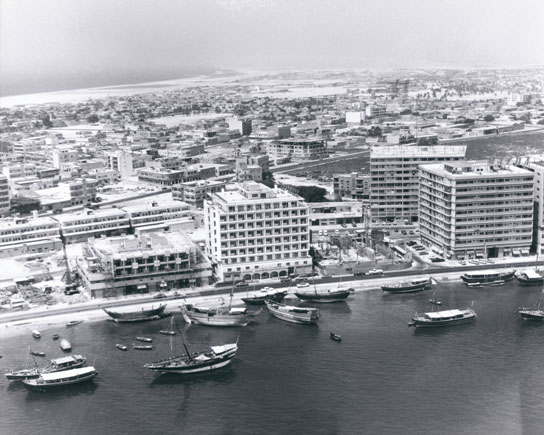
Carlton Tower Hotel as the first 5 star Hotel in Dubai in 1977

== History ==
The company is owned by the First Investor LLC, a subsidiary of the Al Fardan Group of Holdings. The first Carlton Hotel was established in October 1977. In 2017, Carlton Downtown Hotel joined to the chain. In 2018, the CEO was Hosni Abdelhadi. The chain operates 12 hotels in 3 countries with a total of 1,156 direct operations hotel rooms. The last of the hotel was added to the chain in February 2020. There is one more direct Hotel under the construction, Carlton Dubai Creek, scheduled to open in early 2022.

== Achievements ==
- Carlton Downtown is occupying one of the twin towers, which previously known as Angsana Hotel & Suites property. This building included as one of the top-30 tallest hotels in the world and having one of the highest open rooftop with the pool in the world.
- In Ramadan in 2017, Carlton Downtown Hotel claimed that they have installed the highest Ramadan tent in the World. Carlton Downtown is known for its celebrations of Ramadan.
- In 2019, Hotelier Middle East magazine, has included the CEO of the Carlton Hotels & Suites as one of the top-50 influenced Hospitality, in 37th place.

== Room Quantity ==
As of now, Carlton Hotels & Suites have a total of 1156 rooms:

Carlton Hotels & Suites
#	Property Name	Opening Year	Room Quantity
1	Carlton Downtown	2017	361
2	Carlton Palace	2016	212
3	Carlton Tower	1977	158
4	Carlton Al Barsha	2020	299
5	Carlton Dubai Creek	2022	126
Total:			1156

== Properties ==
There are total of 14 properties operated by Carlton Hotels & Suites, whereas 5 of them are operated directly.

=== Direct Management ===
- Carlton Downtown, Dubai, UAE
- Carlton Palace Hotel, Dubai, UAE
- Carlton Tower Hotel, Dubai, UAE
- Carlton Al Barsha Hotel, Dubai, UAE
- Carlton Dubai Creek Hotel, Dubai, UAE

=== Standalone ===
This hotel operates under standalone names, but owned by Carlton Hotels & Suites:

- Imperial Palace by Carlton, Amman, Jordan
- Hotel Sun, Mariánské Lázně, Czech Republic
- Belvedere Hotel, Mariánské Lázně, Czech Republic
- Spa Hotel, Prague, Czech Republic
- Hotel Lázně Jáchymov, Jáchymov, Czech Republic

=== Franchised ===
There are also 4 franchises that are operated by other hotel chains:

- Marriott Executive Apartments, Dubai, UAE
- Rotana Hotels, Dubai, UAE
- Four Points by Sheraton, Dubai, UAE
- Best Western, Dubai, UAE
