= One Za'abeel =

Skyscraper in Dubai, United Arab Emirates

One Za’abeel
- One Za’abeel in Dubai
- Interactive map of the One Za’abeel area

General information
- Status: Completed
- Type: Multi-building complex
- Architectural style: Modern
- Location: Za'abeel, Dubai, United Arab Emirates
- Construction started: January 2016
- Completed: December 2023
- Opening: 10 February 2024

Height
- Top floor: 305 m (1,001 ft) (Tower 2); 235 m (771 ft) (Tower 1)

Technical details
- Floor count: 68 (Tower 2); 59 (Tower 1)

Design and construction
- Architect: Nikken Sekkei
- Developer: Ithra Dubai
- Main contractor: ALEC Engineering & Contracting LLC

One Za’abeel is a mixed-use skyscraper located in the Za’abeel district of Dubai, United Arab Emirates. The development was completed in December 2023 and officially opened on 10 February 2024. It consists of two towers connected by a horizontal structure known as The Link.

== Design and architecture ==
The skyscraper was designed by the Japanese architectural firm Nikken Sekkei and developed by Ithra Dubai, a subsidiary of Investment Corporation of Dubai (ICD). It consists of two towers: One Za’abeel Tower and One Za’abeel The Residences. These towers are joined by The Link, which is positioned 100 meters (328 feet) above ground. The Link extends 230 meters (754 feet) and includes a cantilevered section that extends 66 meters (216 feet). The cantilever measuring 67.5 metres is considered to be the world's largest of its kind. At 230 metres long, the Link is only five metres shorter than the smallest of the two skyscrapers. The second tower extends to 305 metres, positioningitself on Dubai's growing list of skyscrapers over 300 metres tall. The towers were constructed with a steel-and-concrete composite structure. The Link is supported by a truss structure and features a glass curtain wall. In 2024, One Za’abeel was recognized by Guinness World Records for having the longest cantilever building in the world.

The residential tower, One Za'abeel The Residences, consits of 264 apartments. Nikken Sekkei adopted custom ceramic stone cladding, marble-style surfaces, and floor tiling with leaf-shaped brass inlays across the apartment and the public spaces.

== Construction ==
Flagpoles in One Za'abeel

Construction began in January 2016 and was completed in December 2023. The Link was built in two phases over a total of 16 days without disruption to the four lanes of live traffic below. Phase one involved the placement of a steel structure weighing over 8,500 tonnes, which was lifted into position over 12 days using specialized equipment, including over 110 jacks. Phase two involved the installation of a 900-tonne cantilevered section, which was completed over four days. The development includes a vertical resort operated by One&Only, 94 private residences, a lifestyle hotel named SIRO, and various dining establishments. The rooftop of The Link features an infinity pool and observation points with views of the Burj Khalifa.

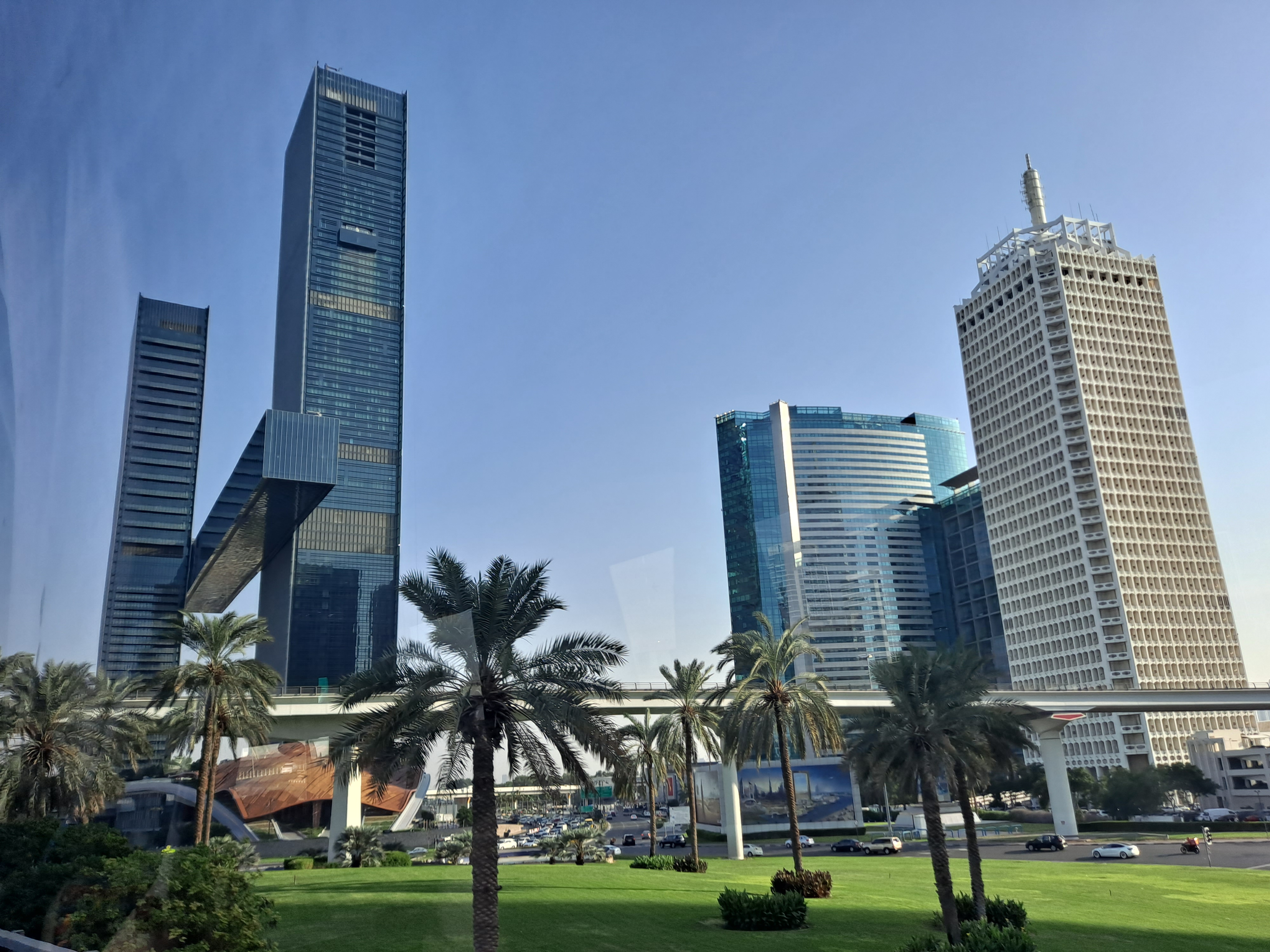
Sheikh Zayed Road

== Location and integration ==
One Za’abeel is situated within the Dubai World Trade Free Zone and was integrated into the Dubai World Trade Centre Authority (DWTCA) Free Zone in 2024 through Decree No. 18 of 2024 issued by Sheikh Mohammed bin Rashid Al Maktoum. The site is located between the old and new business districts, with nearby landmarks including Za'abeel Park, the Dubai World Trade Centre, Sheikh Zayed Road, and Al Mustaqbal Street. A four-lane elevated highway runs between the two towers, and a podium design connects both plots.

== Dining ==
One Za'abeel is a gastronomic hub in Dubai, hosting culinary venues helmed by a number of chefs across The Link cantilever and The Garden level. The destination offers diverse culinary options such as Indonesian cuisine at Andaliman, Japanese cuisine at Nobu, Culinara etc.

== Business and operations ==
Ariel view of the Link.

One Za'abeel includes about 26,000 m^{2} of office space spanning over the 17 levels. On May, 2024 the complex was incorporated into the Dubai World Trade Centre Authority (DWTCA) Free Zone, a designation which allows tenants to benefit from dual licensing privilege, duty exemptions, zero corporate tax and foreign ownership.

== Awards & recognition ==
- The Link
  The project received the Award of Excellence for Best Tall Building in the Middle East & Africa 2024 and Best Tall Building, 300 meters and above 2024
- It was Listed in CTBUH’s annual global list of notable projects in the AEC industry
- On March 1, 2024, One Za'abeel was officially granted the Guinness World Record title for the "Longest Cantilevered Building" in the world.
- In November 2020, One Za'abeel won the "Best Innovation Project of the Year" award for the project's adherence to best construction practices and the innovative technique used in its iconic two-phase lift of "The Link" structure. The Award was organised by BNC Publishing.

== See also ==
- Burj Khalifa
- Dubai World Trade Centre
- Zabeel Park
- Sheikh Zayed Road
- List of tallest buildings in Dubai
- List of tallest buildings in the United Arab Emirates
- List of tallest structures
- List of tallest buildings
- List of buildings in Dubai
- Dubai Gold District
