= Deyaar =

Dubai real estate company

Deyaar Development PJSC
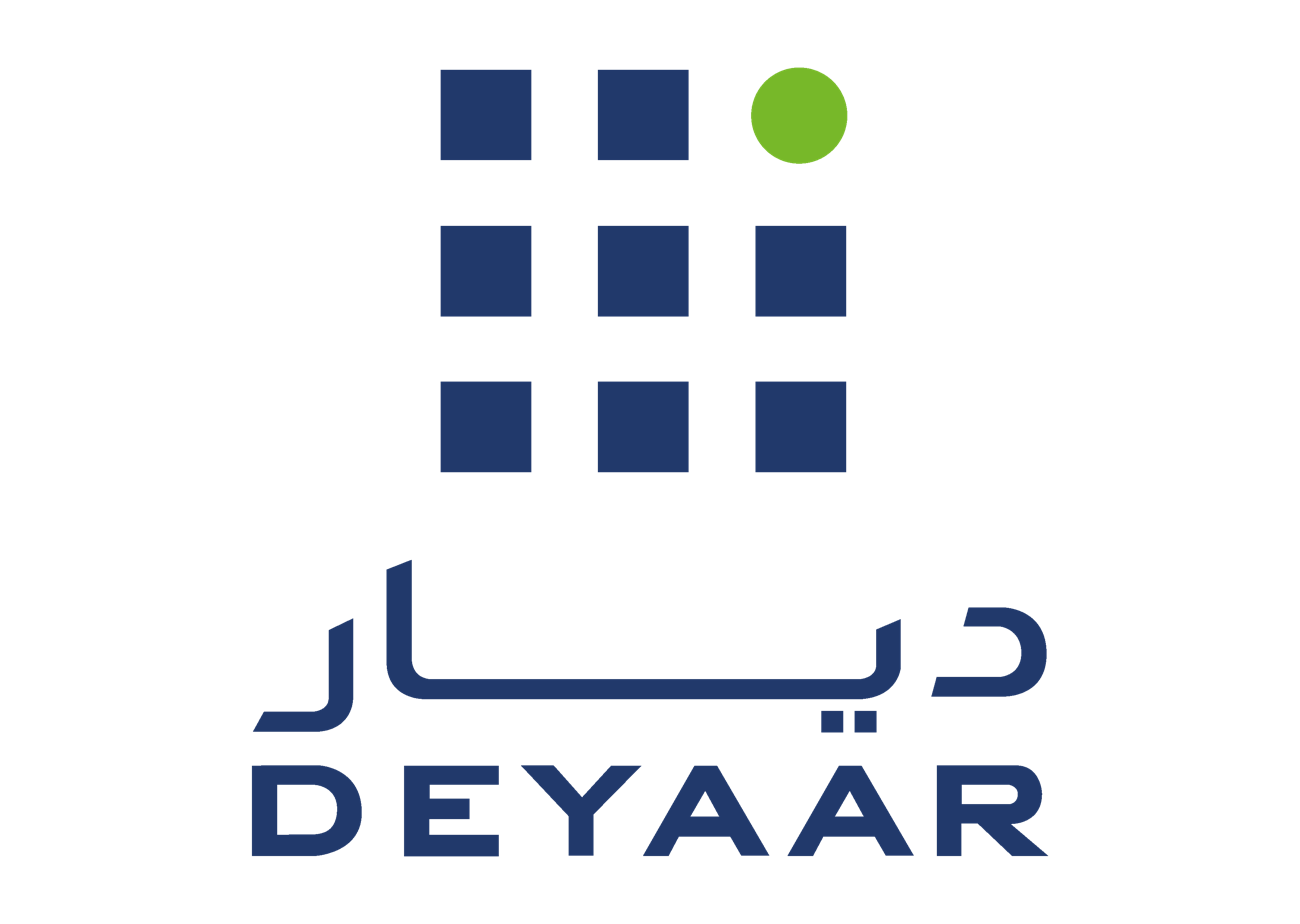
- Trade name: DEYAAR
- Company type: Corporation
- Industry: Real Estate
- Founded: January 1999
- Headquarters: Al Barsha 1st, Dubai, United Arab Emirates
- Key people: Saeed Al Qatami (CEO); Abdullah Ali Al Hamli (chair)
- Owner: Dubai Islamic Bank
- Website: Deyaar

Deyaar is a UAE-based real estate development and services company. The company develops and sells residential and commercial properties and is majority owned by Dubai Islamic Bank.

== History ==
At inception, Deyaar started as the property management unit of Dubai Islamic Bank. Deyaar was later established as a private shareholding company on January 6, 2001, with a paid up capital of AED 18.38 million, and commenced operations on June 1, 2003.

In May 2007, Deyaar became a public joint-stock company and was listed on the Dubai Financial Market.

In 2019, a UAE court ordered Dubai-based developer Limitless to pay Deyaar AED 411.9 million in a land dispute, AED 61.1 million in fees and compensation. In October 2022, Deyaar's board of directors approved an AED 500 million cash settlement made by Limitless.

Projects Deyaar worked on include the Dh1bn Regalia tower in Business Bay, the Bella Rose development project in Dubai Science Park, and Tria residential tower in Dubai Silicon Oasis.
