= The Index (Dubai) =

- The Index in November 2024
- Interactive map of the The Index area

General information
- Status: Completed
- Type: Mixed-use
- Location: Plot- DIFC; Dubai
- Coordinates: 25°12′24.89″N 55°16′40.42″E
- Construction started: 7 November 2005
- Completed: 4 October 2010
- Opening: 12 December 2010

Height
- Architectural: 326 metres (1,070 ft)
- Top floor: 322 metres (1,056 ft)

Technical details
- Floor count: 80
- Floor area: 170,400 square metres (1,834,170 sq ft)
- Lifts/elevators: 27

Design and construction
- Architect: Foster + Partners
- Developer: Union Properties
- Structural engineer: Halvorson and Partners
- Main contractor: Brookfield Multiplex

The Index is a 328 m (1,076 ft) tall, 80-storey skyscraper in Dubai, United Arab Emirates. Of the 80 floors, the first four floors are service floors, 5th–29th are to be offices and 31st–77th are residential use, 73rd and 75th floors are duplex penthouses and 77th to 80th floor are triplex penthouses. The tower is oriented exactly along the east–west axis so that the eastern and western concrete cores shelter the floors from the harsh, desert sun and the climatic effects of the area. The concrete cores shelter the building from the low angle, highly penetrating morning and evening sun leaving only the south facade exposed to the high angle, low penetrating midday sun. The south-facing facade utilizes extensive sun shades to lower solar gain.

The Index was designed for its climatic surrounding environment. The tower's environmental strategy significantly lowers the requirement for air conditioning within the building and therefore substantially reduces the energy costs for its tenants. During the height of the summer, without air conditioning, the tower's internal temperatures will not surpass 28 °C (82 °F).

The tower has car parking for 2,442 cars. A double height sky lobby separates the offices and apartments with recreational facilities, such as a swimming pool and a gym.

In June 2011, The Index Tower was the recipient of the 2011 Best Tall Building Middle East & Africa award by the Council on Tall Buildings and Urban Habitat.

As of December 2015, the full retail space, two-thirds of the office floors and 1404 parking spaces were owned by Emirates REIT, UAE's first Real Estate Investment Trust.

== See also ==
- List of tallest buildings in Dubai
- List of tallest buildings in the United Arab Emirates
- List of tallest buildings in the world
