= Executive Towers =

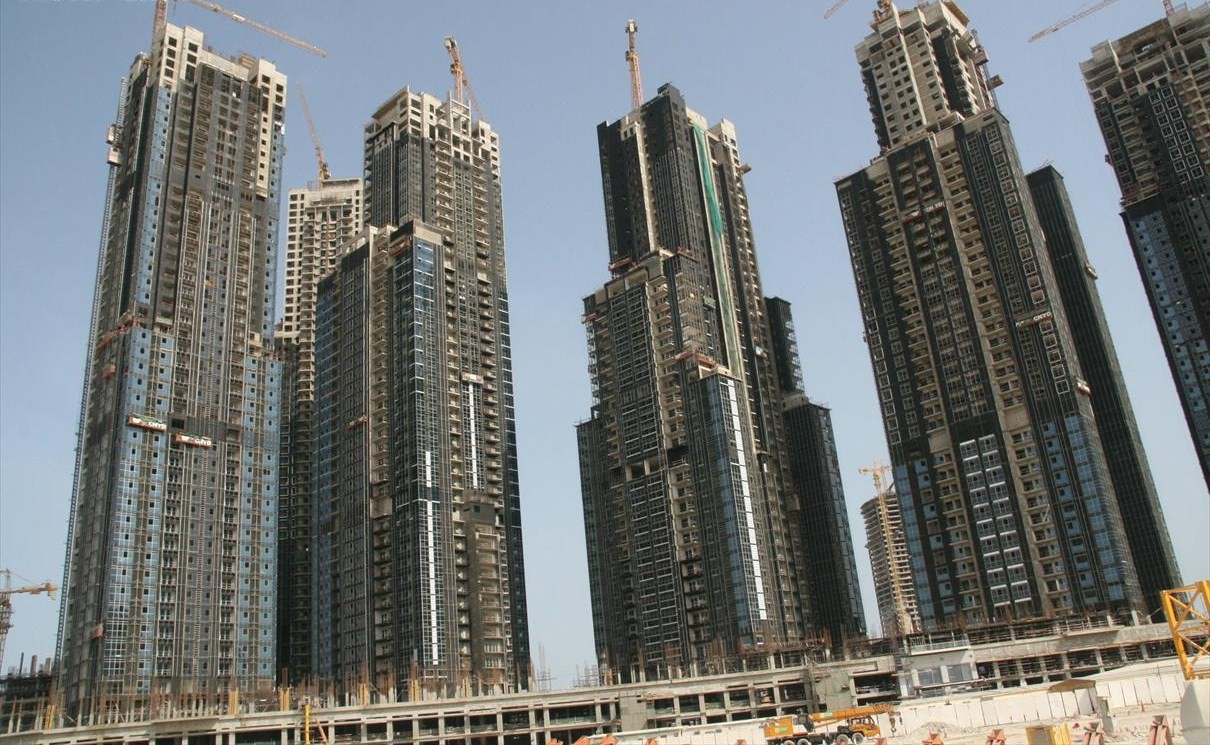
- Interactive map of the Executive Towers area

General information
- Status: Completed
- Type: 10 residential 1 commercial 1 hotel
- Location: Dubai, United Arab Emirates
- Coordinates: 25°11′26.94″N 55°15′56.86″E
- Construction started: 2007
- Opening: 2010

Technical details
- Floor count: 45

Design and construction
- Architect: WS Atkins & Partners
- Developer: Dubai Properties

The Executive Towers is a complex of 12 towers in Business Bay development in Dubai, United Arab Emirates. They comprise 10 residential towers, one commercial tower known as Aspect Tower, and one hotel tower 'The Taj Hotel'. They are the first buildings to be completed in Business Bay, and are located near its entrance.

A three-storey podium connects all the towers in addition to the nearby Vision Tower, which is going to be connected by a special passage. The first two levels of the podium comprise Bay Avenue shopping mall, with retail space of 175,000 square feet (16,300 m^{2}) and water-front terraces. The third level (Plaza Level) is called The Courtyard, it contains communal facilities, landscaped plazas, children’s play areas, fountain yards, courtyards, and covered walking arcades.

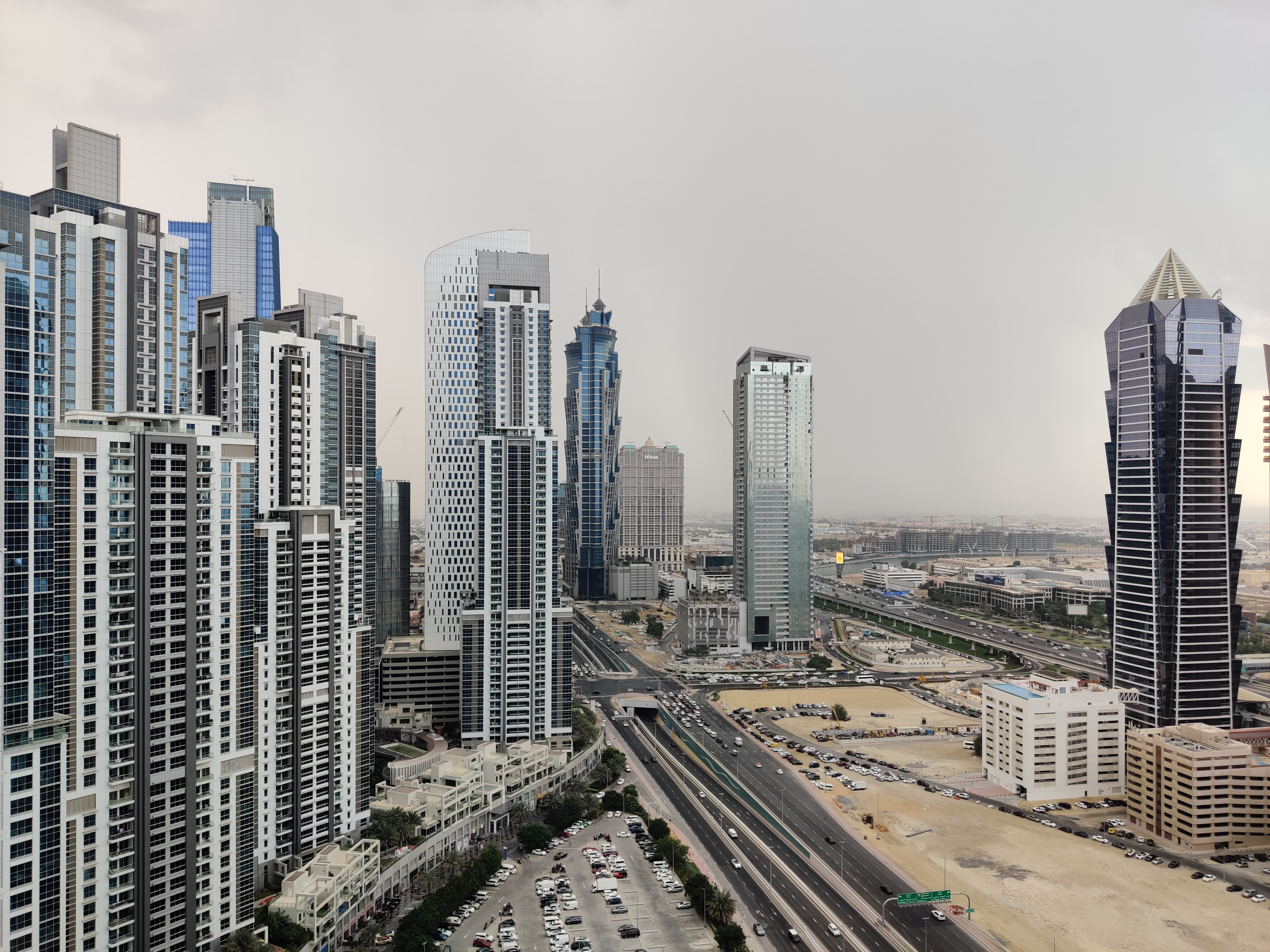
View from Aspect Tower - The Executive Towers, facing Happiness St.

== Towers ==
The complex consists of twelve skyscrapers:

Rank	Name	Height metres / ft	Floors
1	Executive Tower M / West Heights 1	210 / 689	52
2	Executive Tower B	190 / 623	47
3	Executive Tower K / West Heights 3	186 / 610	46
4	Executive Tower H / West Heights 5	182 / 597	45
5	Executive Tower L	182 / 597	45
6	Executive Tower G / West Heights 6	170 / 558	42
7	Executive Tower J / West Heights 4	170 / 558	42
8	Aspect Tower	135 / 443	39
9	Executive Tower F / East Heights One	120 / 394	30
10	Executive Tower E	118 / 387	29
11	Executive Hotel Tower	114 / 374	28
12	Executive Tower C	114 / 347	28

== Progress ==
The towers are complete with also parks, water fountains and car parking space. In addition, the Executive Tower Hotel at the end of the podium, had stalled pending obtaining financing for the fit out. The Hotel was taken over by the Taj Hotel chain and opened its doors early 2015.

== See also ==
- List of tallest buildings in Dubai
- List of tallest buildings in the United Arab Emirates
