= Provident Estate =

Real estate brokerage firm based in Dubai, UAE

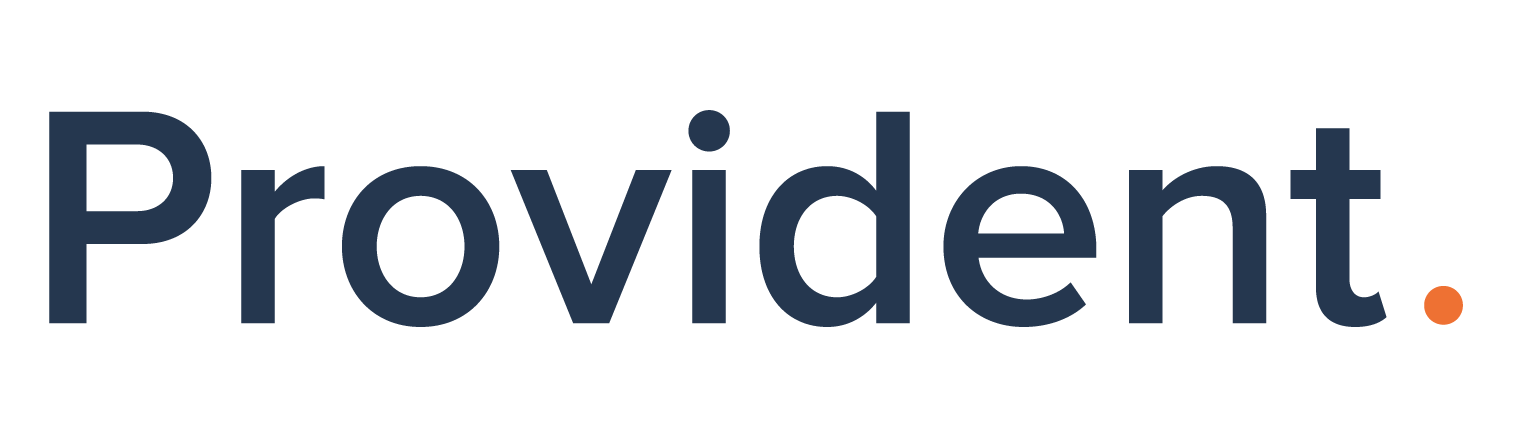
- Industry: Real estate
- Founded: 2008; 18 years ago
- Founder: Loai Al Fakir
- Headquarters: Dubai, UAE
- Number of employees: 300+ (as of 2024)
- Website: www.providentestate.com

Provident Estate is a real estate brokerage firm based in Dubai, United Arab Emirates. Founded in 2008 by Loai Al Fakir, the company operates within the residential and commercial property markets, providing brokerage, leasing, and property management services.

== History ==
Provident Estate was established in 2008 by Loai Al Fakir.

In 2023, the firm reported transactions exceeding AED 635 million through agreements with developers including Select Group and Sobha Realty. The same year, it was appointed as the exclusive sales agent for Habtoor Tower in Al Habtoor City, a project by Al Habtoor Group.

During 2024 and 2025, Provident Estate published periodic market reports analysing residential property transactions in Dubai. According to its 2025 data, the emirate recorded over 49,000 property transactions in the second quarter of 2025, with a total value of approximately AED 147 billion.

== Notable transactions ==
In December 2023, Provident Estate brokered the sale of a penthouse at Como Residences on Palm Jumeirah for US$136 million, which was reported as Dubai’s most expensive residential sale at the time.

== Recognition ==
Provident Estate has received multiple awards from property developers:

- "Highest Performing Channel Partner" from Sobha Realty in 2024
- Recognition at Emaar's Annual Broker Awards 2024

== See also ==
- Real estate in the United Arab Emirates
- Dubai Land Department
- Emaar Properties
- DAMAC Properties
- List of companies of the United Arab Emirates
