= List of tallest hotels =

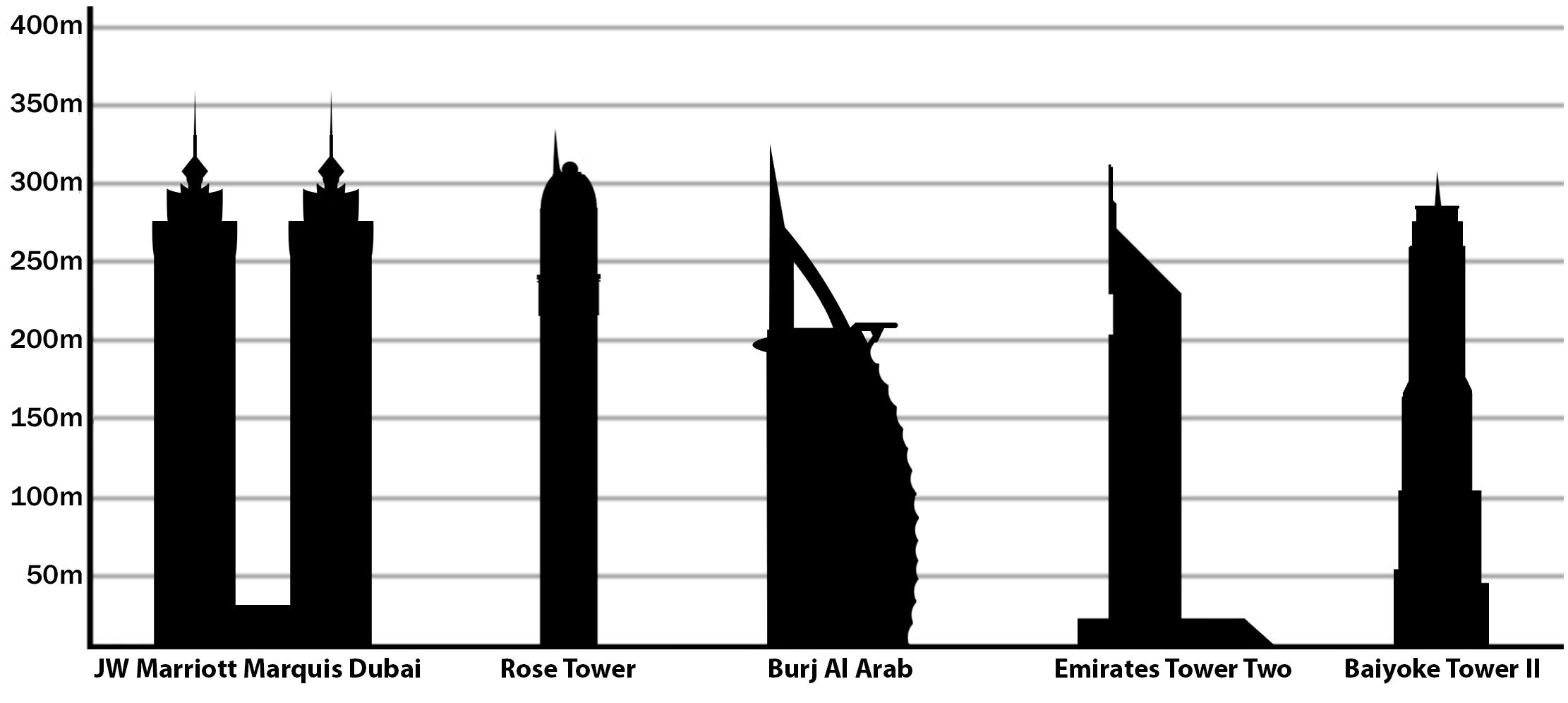
Some of the tallest hotels in the world

This is a list of the tallest buildings in the world at least 80% of which are given over to hotels. Various other tall buildings are multi-use and have a hotel occupying the building's uppermost floors; such hotels are known as the highest hotels in the world. The world's highest hotel is the Rosewood Guangzhou located on the top floors of the 111-story Guangzhou CTF Finance Centre in China, soaring to 530 meters at its highest point.

== Completed or topped out ==
This list ranks both completed as well as topped out hotel–only buildings that stand at least 200 m (656 ft) tall, based on standard height measurement. Skyscrapers less than 80% of which are used as a hotel are not included in this list.

Burj Al Arab, in Dubai, UAE

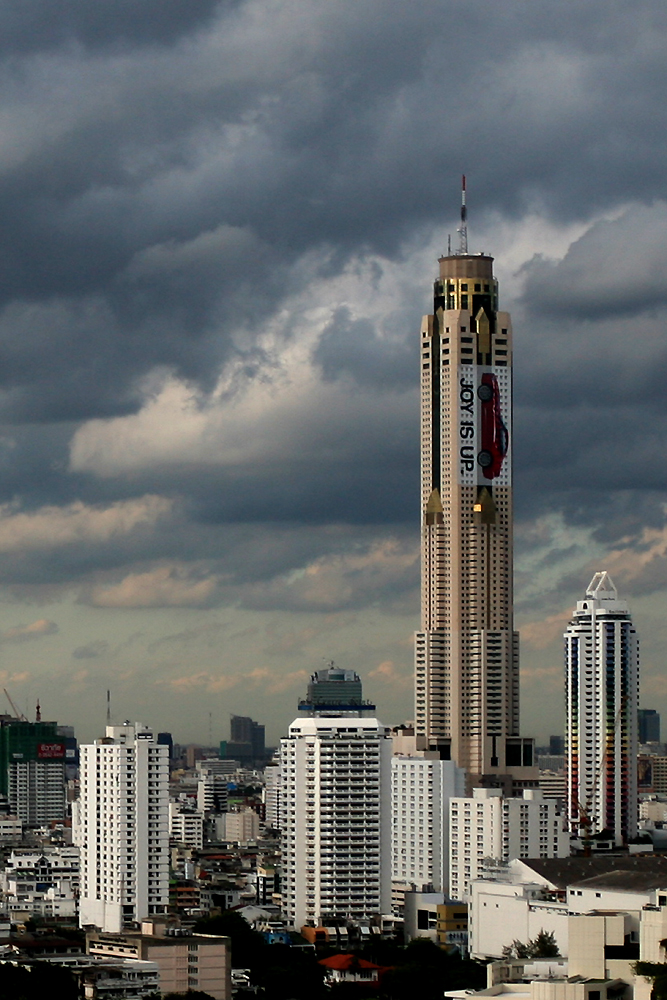
Baiyoke Tower II in Bangkok, Thailand

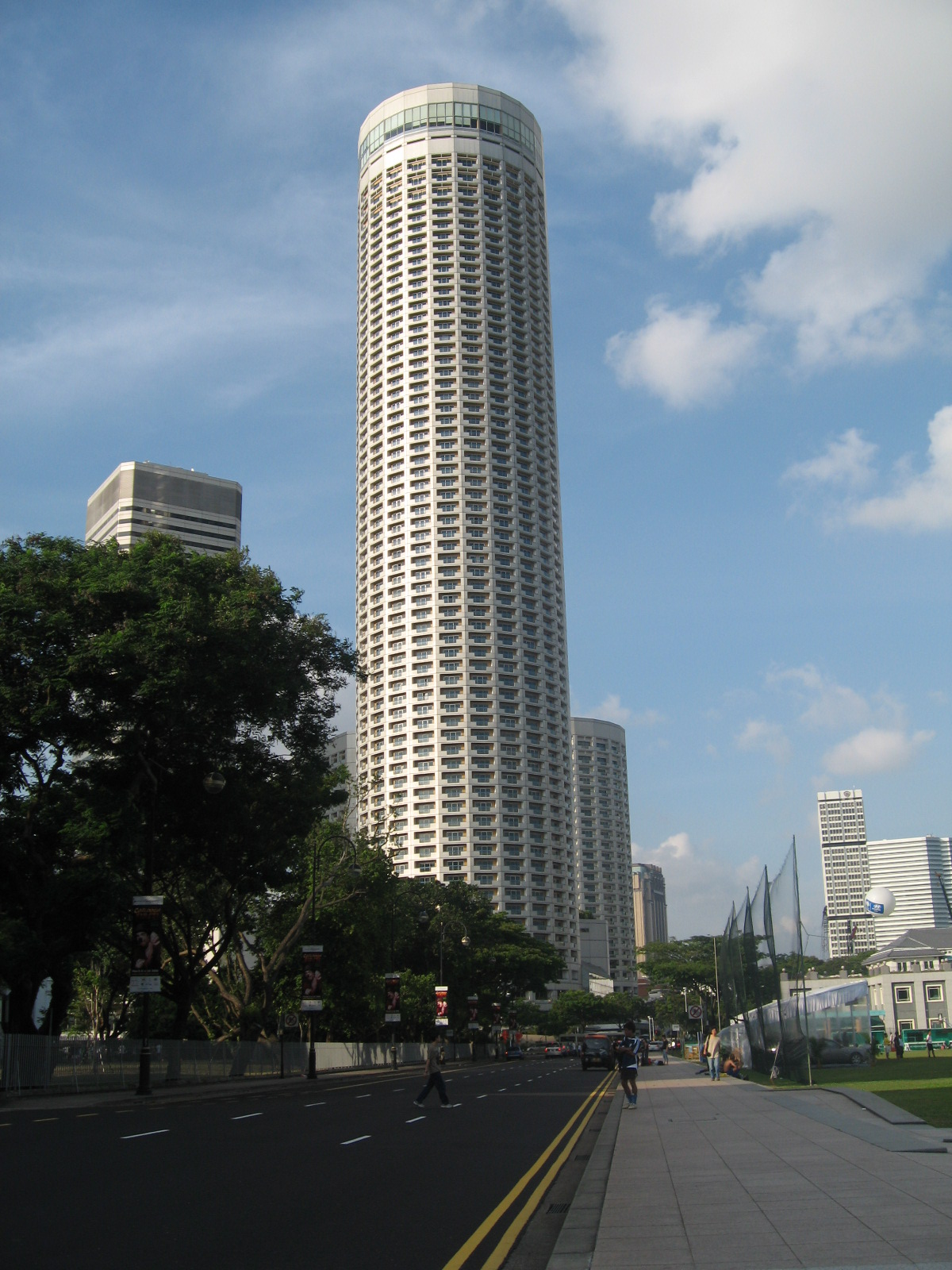
Swissôtel The Stamford, in Singapore

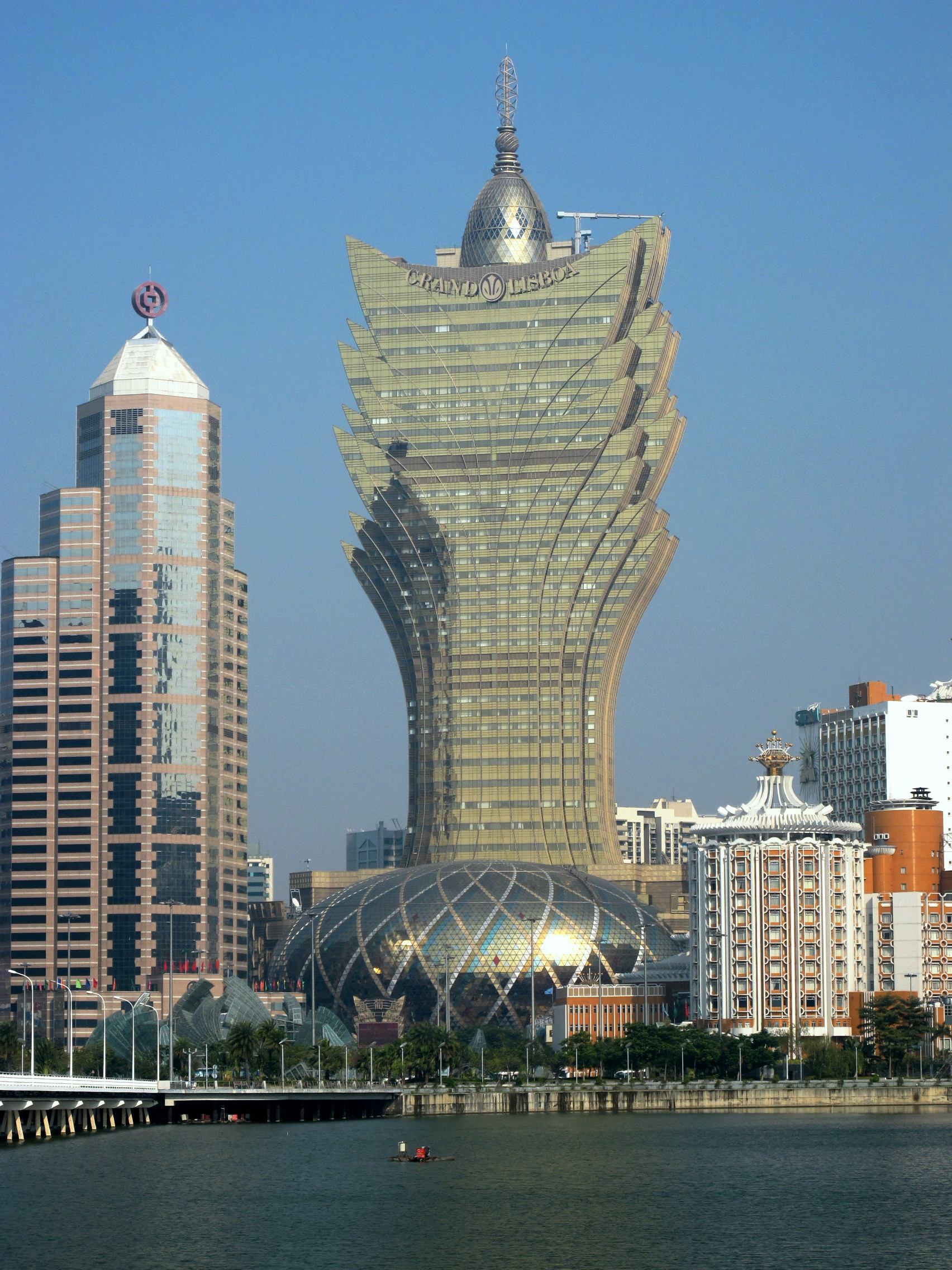
Grand Lisboa in Macao

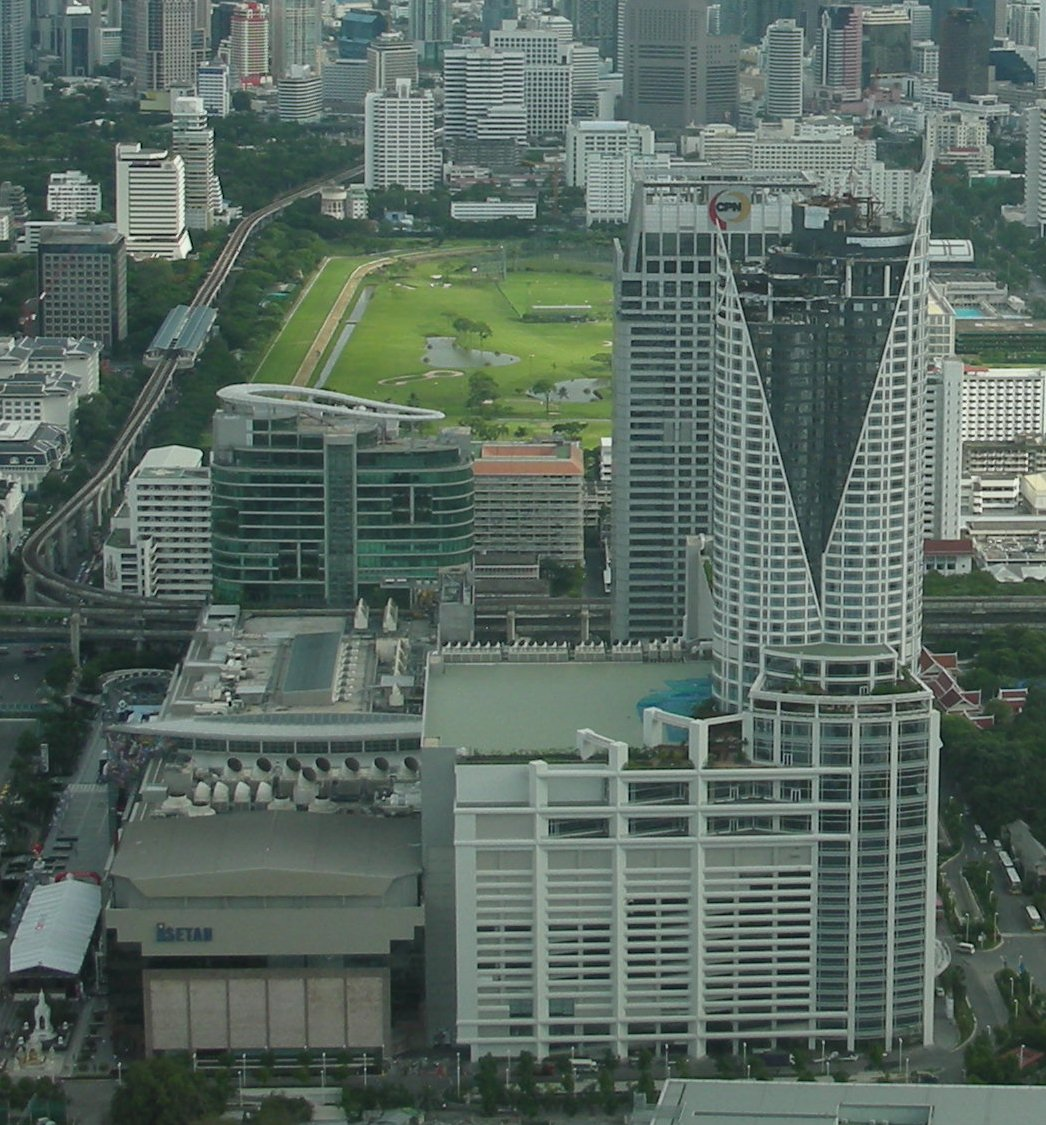
Centara Grand and Bangkok Convention Centre, in Bangkok, Thailand

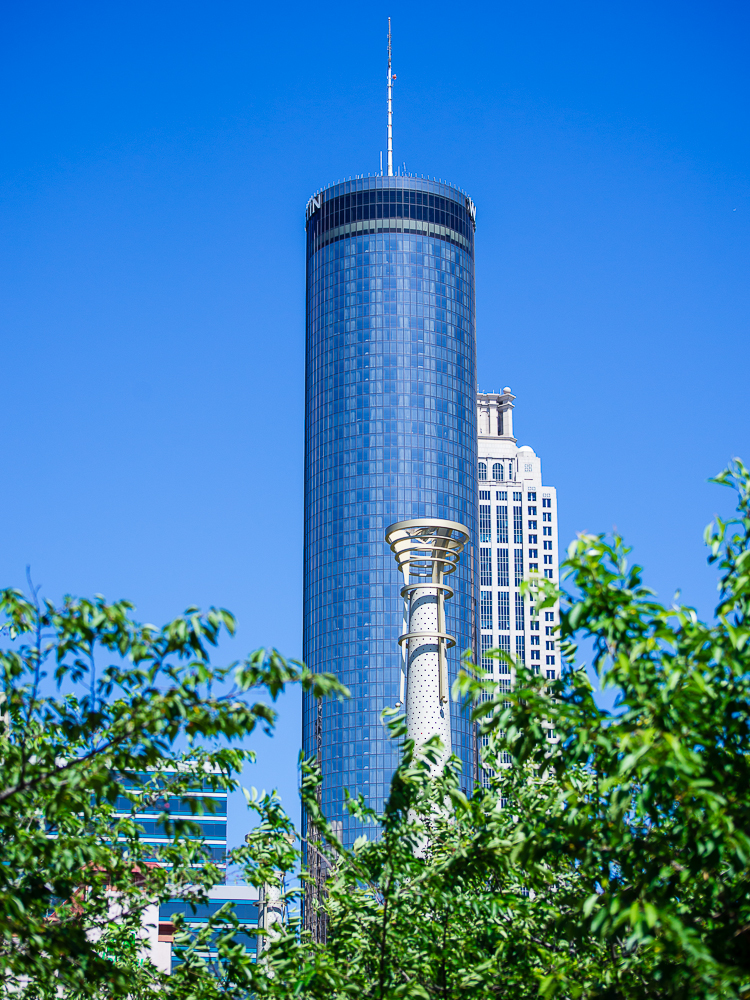
Westin Peachtree Plaza, Atlanta, Georgia, United States

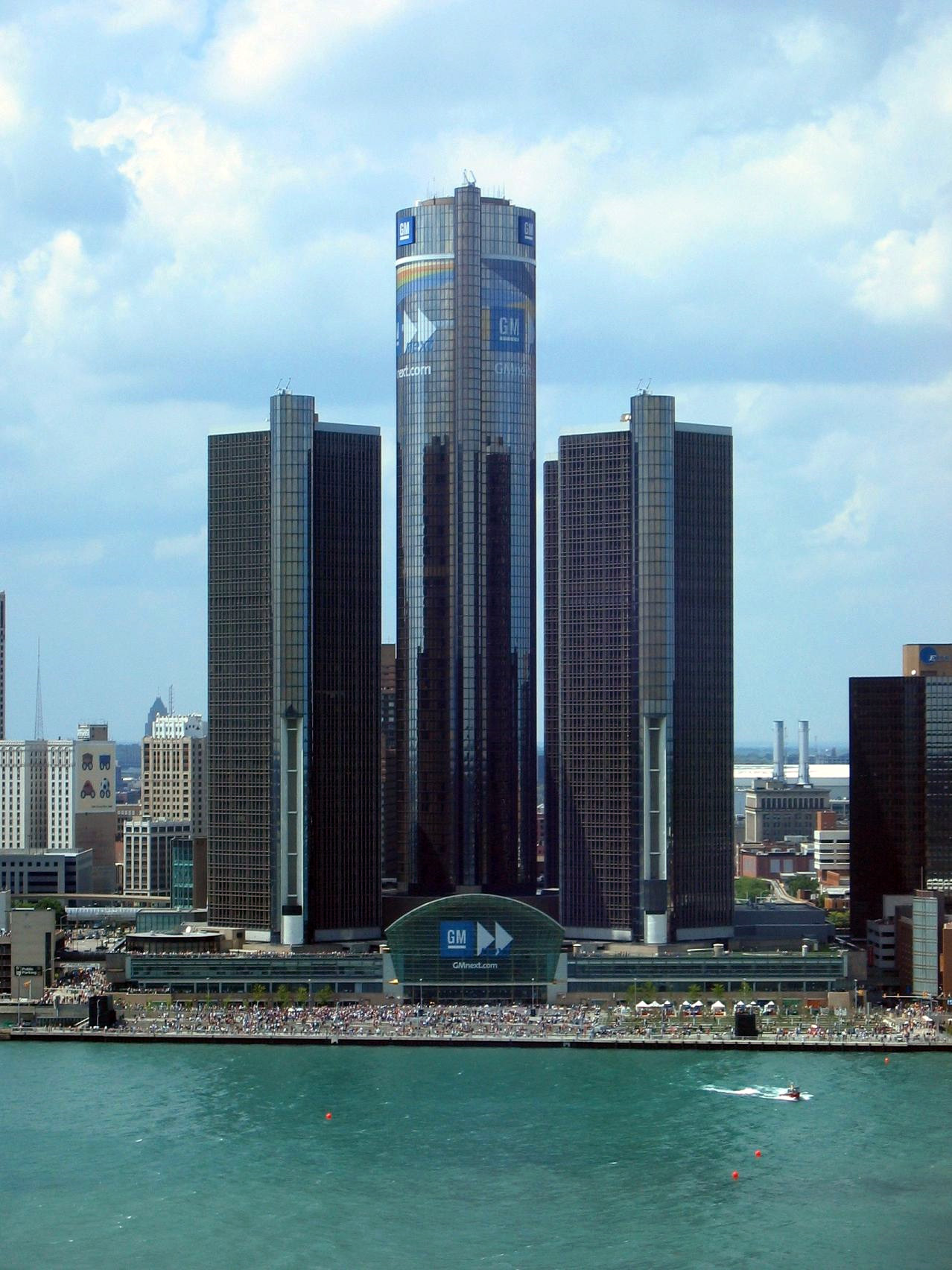
Renaissance Center in Detroit, Michigan, United States

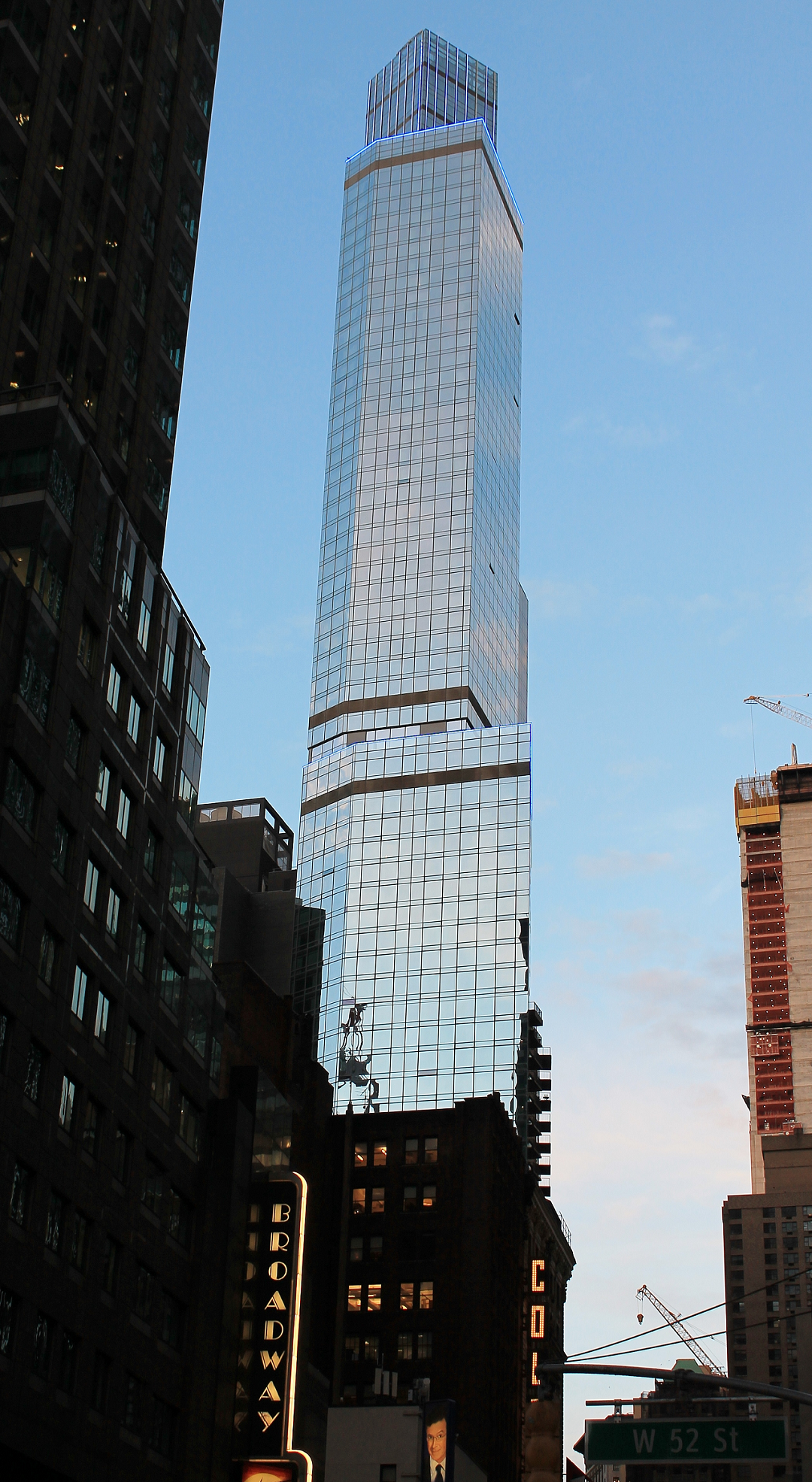
Courtyard/Residence Inn New York Manhattan/Central Park (1717 Broadway), in New York City, New York, United States

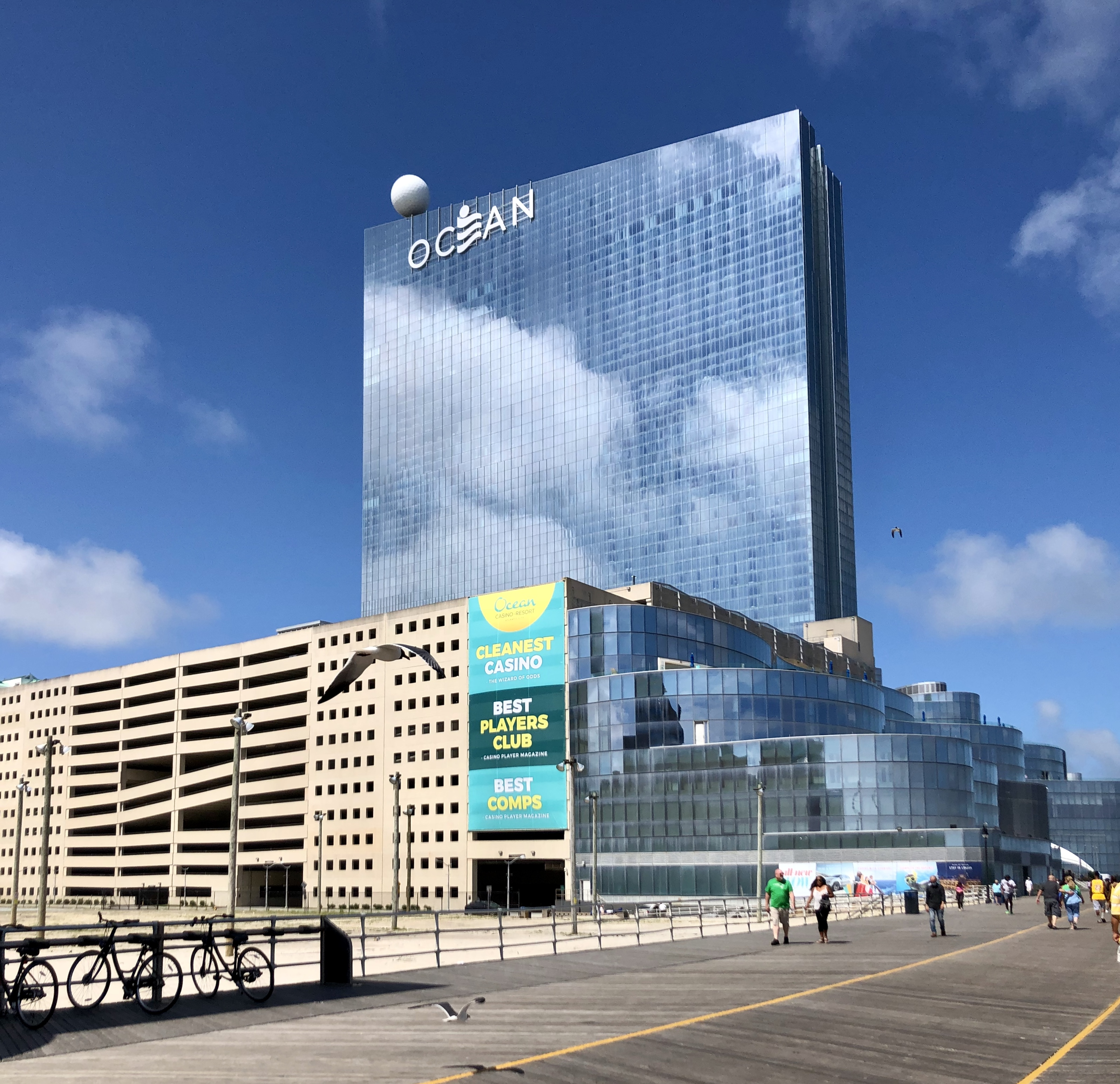
Ocean Casino Resort in Atlantic City, New Jersey, United States

Was the world’s tallest hotel building upon completion
Indicates buildings still under construction that have been architecturally topped out but not yet fully opened

Rank	Name	City	Country	Height		Floors	Built
Rank	Name	City	Country	m	ft	Floors	Built
1	Ciel Tower	Dubai	UAE	377	1,237	82	2024
2	Gevora Hotel	Dubai	UAE	356.3	1,169	75	2017
3	JW Marriott Marquis Dubai	Dubai	UAE	355	1,165	82	2012
4	Shimao International Plaza	Shanghai	China	333	1,093	60	2006
4	Rose Rayhaan by Rotana	Dubai	UAE	333	1,093	72	2007
6	Burj Al Arab	Dubai	UAE	321	1,053	56	1999
7	Jumeirah Emirates Towers Hotel	Dubai	UAE	309	1,014	56	2000
9	Baiyoke Tower II	Bangkok	Thailand	304	997	85	1997
9	Wuxi Maoye City – Marriott Hotel	Wuxi	China	304	997	68	2013
10	The Tower Plaza	Dubai	UAE	294	965	65	2011
11	The Sky Taipei	Taipei	China	280	920	56	2025
12	Four Seasons Hotel	Manama	Bahrain	270	890	60	2014
13	Radisson Royal Dubai	Dubai	UAE	269	883	60	2010
14	Sail Tower	Jeddah	Saudi Arabia	264.7	868	65	2021
15	Grand Lisboa	Macau	Macau	261	856	52	2008
16	Raffles Jakarta	Jakarta	Indonesia	253.3	831	52	2014
17	Wyndham Ion Majestic	Genting Highlands	Malaysia	253	830	50	2024
18	Financial Street Westin Hotel	Chongqing	China	245	804	54	2014
19	Western International Finance Center	Chengdu	China	241	791	65	2014
20	The Peak Shangri-La	Phnom Penh	Cambodia	236	774	58	2021
21	Centara Grand Hotel	Bangkok	Thailand	235	771	57	2008
22	Wyndham Grand i-City	Shah Alam	Malaysia	232	761	55	2025
23	The Palm Tower	Dubai	UAE	230	750	52	2019
24	Courtyard/Residence Inn New York Manhattan/Central Park	New York City	United States	229.4	753	68	2013
25	Swissôtel The Stamford	Singapore	Singapore	226	741	73	1986
26	Fontainebleau Las Vegas	Las Vegas	United States	224	735	67	2023
27	Renaissance Center	Detroit	United States	222	728	73	1977
28	Carlton Downtown	Dubai	UAE	221	725	49	2008
29	Residence Inn By Marriott at Sheikh Zayed Road	Dubai	UAE	221	725	49	2008
28	Westin Peachtree Plaza Hotel	Atlanta	United States	220	720	73	1976
30	Furama Hotel Phase 3	Dalian	China	218	715	55	2014
31	Ocean Casino Resort	Atlantic City	United States	216	709	53	2012
32	Jeju Dream Hotel Tower	Jeju	South Korea	213	699	62	
33	Ritz-Carlton Jakarta Tower I	Jakarta	Indonesia	212	696	48	2005
34	Ritz-Carlton Jakarta Tower II	Jakarta	Indonesia	212	696	48	2005
35	Hopewell Hotel	Hong Kong	China	210	690	55	2024
36	Four Seasons Hotel New York	New York City	United States	208	682	52	1993
37	Radisson Hotel Shanghai New World	Shanghai	China	208	682	47	2003
38	Hilton Hotel Main Building	Dongguan	China	208	682	52	2017
39	Tamani Hotel Marina	Dubai	UAE	207	679	54	2006
40	Sofitel Jin Jiang Oriental Pudong Hotel	Shanghai	China	207	679	47	2002
41	Hotel Ukraina	Moscow	Russia	206	676	34	1957
42	Marina Bay Tower 1	Singapore	Singapore	206	676	57	2010
42	Marina Bay Tower 3	Singapore	Singapore	206	676	57	2010
44	Resorts World Las Vegas	Las Vegas	United States	205	673	59	2021
44	Four Seasons Hotel Hong Kong	Hong Kong	Hong Kong	205	673	55	2005
46	Hotel Riu Plaza Guadalajara	Guadalajara	Mexico	204	669	42	2004
47	Berjaya Times Square Hotel Tower A	Kuala Lumpur	Malaysia	203	666	48	2003
48	Renaissance Hotel Tianjin	Tianjin	China	203	666	48	2002
49	Marina Bay Tower 2	Singapore	Singapore	203	666	57	2010
50	Yuanyang Building	Dalian	China	201	659	51	2000
51	Dolton Hotel Changsha	Changsha	China	200	660	51	1998
51	Conrad Seoul Hotel	Seoul	South Korea	200	660	37	2012
51	Dicara Gold Tower - Hilton Hotel	Hangzhou	China	200	660	55	2014
51	City Center Hotel	Doha	Qatar	200	660	58	2013

== Timeline of the tallest hotels ==
Built	Name	City	Country	Height		Floors
Built	Name	City	Country	m	ft	Floors
1926	Ritz Tower	New York City	United States	165	541	41
1927	Hotel Sherry-Netherland	New York City	United States	171	561	40
1931	The Waldorf-Astoria Hotel	New York City	United States	191	627	47
1955	Hotel Ukraina	Moscow	Russia	198	650	34
1976	Westin Peachtree Plaza Hotel	Atlanta	United States	220.37	723.0	73
1977	Renaissance Center	Detroit	United States	222	728	73
1986	Swissôtel The Stamford	Singapore	Singapore	226	741	73
1997	Baiyoke Tower II	Bangkok	Thailand	304	997	85
1999	Burj Al Arab	Dubai	UAE	321	1,053	56
2006	Shimao International Plaza	Shanghai	China	333	1,093	60
2012	JW Marriott Marquis Dubai	Dubai	UAE	355	1,165	82
2017	Gevora Hotel	Dubai	UAE	356.3	1,169	75
2025	Ciel Tower	Dubai	UAE	377	1,237	83

== Hotels under construction ==
This list contains hotels skyscrapers that are at least 200 m (660 ft) in height and are currently under construction.

Name	City	Country	Height		Floors	Planned opening
Name	City	Country	m	ft	Floors	Planned opening
Naga 3 Tower A	Phnom Penh	Cambodia	358	1,175	75	2029
Wynn Al Marjan Island	Ras Al Khaimah	UAE	352	1,155	72	2027
Ryugyong Hotel	Pyongyang	North Korea	330	1,080	105	?
740 Eighth Avenue	New York City	United States	325	1,066	52	2027
The Pinnacle Tower II	Nairobi	Kenya	275	902	46	2029
Cube Tower	Batumi	Georgia	260	850	42	2027
Naga 3 Tower B	Phnom Penh	Cambodia	256	840	61	2029
Naga 3 Tower C	Phnom Penh	Cambodia	256	840	61	2029
Baccarat Hotel Downtown Dubai	Dubai	UAE	237	778	46	2027
Tycoon Tower	The New Capital	Egypt	233	764	56	2028
Wyatt Hotel	Xiamen	China	213	699	41	2026
Hard Rock Las Vegas Guitar Tower	Las Vegas	United States	210	690	42	2027

== See also ==
- List of tallest buildings in the world
- List of tallest residential buildings in the world
- History of the tallest buildings in the world
- List of cities with most skyscrapers
- List of largest hotels in the world
- Lists of hotels an index of hotel list articles on Wikipedia

== Notes ==
A. Construction is on hold since 2011.
B. Topped out but not completed.
