= Dubai Properties =

Real estate development company

- Type: Subsidiary
- Industry: Real estate
- Founded: 2002
- Headquarters: Dubai, United Arab Emirates
- Key people: Khalid Al Malik, CEO
- Parent: Dubai Holding
- Website: Official site

Dubai Properties is a property development and management company based in Dubai, United Arab Emirates. The company is a member of the Dubai Holding group. In 2009 the attorney general of Dubai stated that Hashim Al Dabal, then chairman of Dubai Properties, was arrested on "suspicion of embezzlement". The government of Dubai announced the following year that Al Dabal was released after returning $35 million in public funds.

Dubai Properties core activity is the development of large scale residential and commercial property developments within the Emirate of Dubai.

== Projects ==
The portfolio of projects handled by Dubai Properties includes:

- Jumeirah Beach Residence
  - The Walk (Jumeirah Beach Residence)
- Business Bay
  - Executive Towers
  - Business Bay Hotel
  - Bay Avenue
  - Ghoroob, Mirdif
  - Shorooq, Mirdif
  - Palm Jebel Ali
  - Dubai Internet City
  - Vision Tower
  - Bay Square
  - Jaddaf Waterfront
  - Mudon
  - Villanova
  - Serena
- Remraam
  - Bellevue Towers
  - Riverside
  - The Villa
  - 1/JBR
  - Dubai Wharf
  - Manazel Al Khor
  - La Vie
