= List of tallest buildings in Guadalajara =

Tall buildings in the Guadalajara metropolitan area
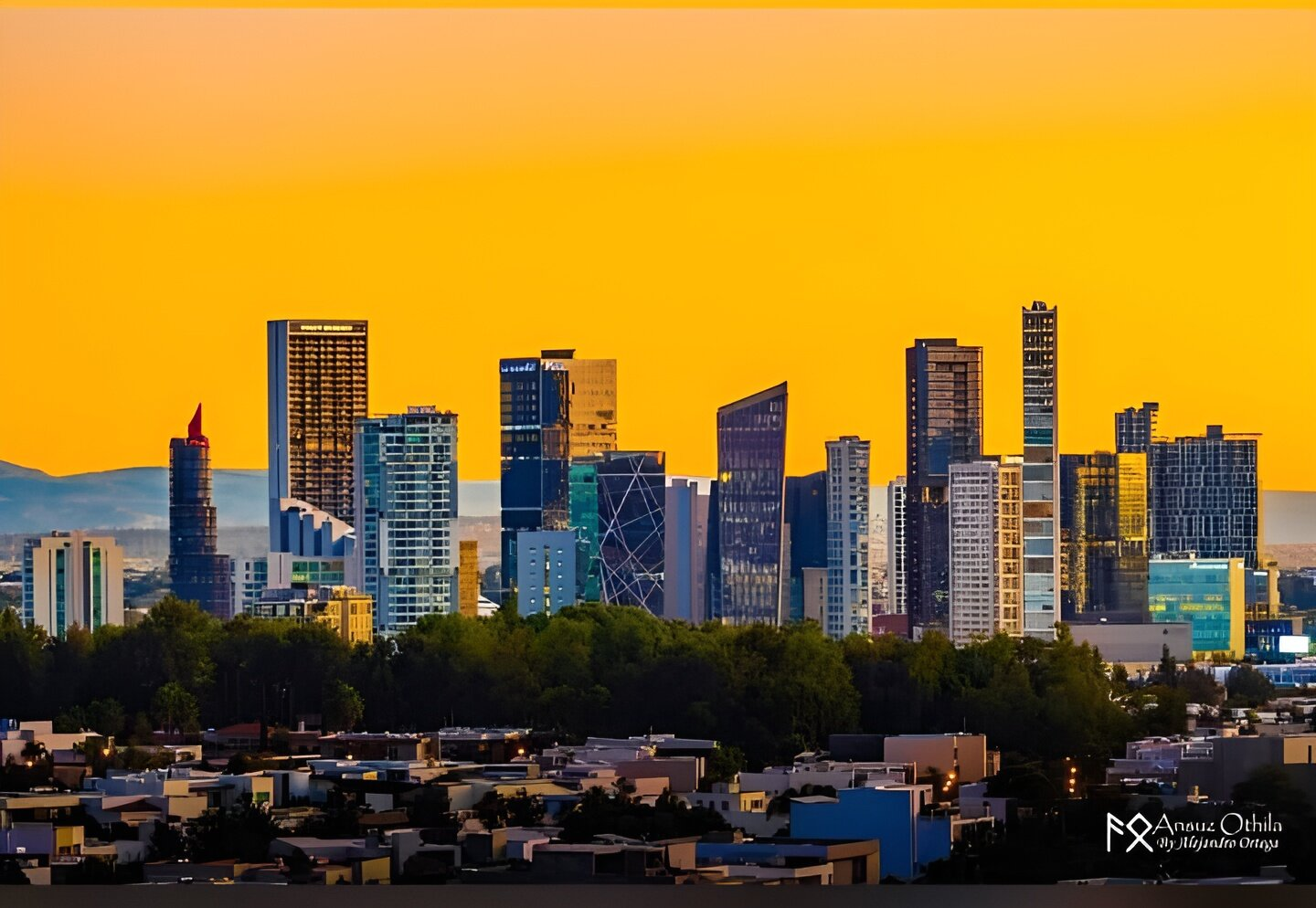
- Skyline of the Puerta de Hierro district in Zapopan in 2021
- Tallest building: Hotel Riu Plaza Guadalajara (2011)
- Tallest building height: 215 m (795.38 ft.)
- First 150 m+ building: Torre Aura Altitude (2008)

Number of tall buildings
- Taller than 100 m (328 ft): 42 (2026)
- Taller than 150 m (492 ft): 7 (2026)
- Taller than 200 m (656 ft): 1 (2025)

This list of tallest buildings in Guadalajara ranks buildings in Guadalajara, Jalisco and its metropolitan area by height. Guadalajara is the capital and largest city of the Mexican state of Jalisco, and its metropolitan area is the third largest in Mexico. The Guadalajara metropolitan area currently has 6 buildings above 150 meters (492 feet) in height, with a further 4 under construction. The tallest building in Guadalajara is the Hotel Riu Plaza Guadalajara at 204 meters (669 feet), a hotel completed in 2011.

== History ==
The history of tall buildings in the city of Guadalajara began in the 1960s, when the 55-meter-high Minerva Tower was built. Three years later, the city's first skyscraper was built, the Guadalajara Condominium, 105 meters high and with 26 floors. By 1965, the city already had its second skyscraper, the Hilton Hotel (now the Hotel Misión Carlton), which was 80 meters high and had 20 floors.

During the 1970s, other buildings continued to be built, most of them under 80 meters high, such as the Federal Palace, the Centro Médico de Occidente, among others. However, in 1972, the Plaza Américas Condominium was inaugurated, becoming the third skyscraper to be built in the city. Six years later, the towers of the Américas Country Residential Condominium were inaugurated.

By the 1980s, more buildings were built, however, most of them were less than 80 meters high, the only one to exceed this height was the Hotel Fiesta Americana, which was 84 meters high and opened in 1982.

In the 1990s, a small boom in the construction of new buildings began, of which two stand out as having become a reference point in the urban panorama of the city: the Hotel Hilton Guadalajara (on Avenida Las Rosas) and the Torre Chapultepec, built in 1994 and 1995 respectively.

In the new millennium, there was a boom in skyscrapers in the Puerta de Hierro district mainly, highlighting the Torre Aura Altitude, Torre Aura Lofts, Torre Aura Puerta de Hierro, Centro Médico Puerta de Hierro, Torre Titanium, Torre Corporativo Zapopan, the Torres Acueducto Tres60 and the Heritage Grand Tower Guadalajara; all between 100 and 150 m high. In the Country Club-Providencia area, new buildings were built, most notably Américas 1501 in Punto Sao Paulo.

In the 2010s, new buildings continued to be built that were taller than the previous ones, with the Hotel Riu Guadalajara Plaza, Hyatt Regency Andares and Corporativo Bansi being the tallest in the city by the end of the decade.

== Tallest buildings ==
The following table ranks high-rises in Guadalajara that stand at least 100m (328 ft) based on standard height measurement. This includes spires and architectural details but does not include antenna masts.

Rank	Name	Image	Location	Height m (ft)	Floors	Year	Purpose	Notes
1	Hotel Riu Plaza Guadalajara		Guadalajara	204 (669 ft)	42	2011	Hotel	
2	Hospital Angeles Andares	—	Zapopan	179 (587 ft)	31	2026	Hospital	Tallest hospital in the world
3	Hyatt Regency Andares		Zapopan	173 (567 ft)	41	2016	Hotel	
4	Torre Aura Altitude	—	Zapopan	171.6 (561 ft)	42	2008	Residential	
5	Corporativo Bansi		Guadalajara	162.3 (531 ft)	32	2019	Office	
6	The Landmark Reserve	—	Zapopan	154 (505 ft)	34	2024	Residential	
7	Midtown Jalisco	—	Guadalajara	147 (482 ft)	30	2019	Office	
8	Landmark Guadalajara		Zapopan	144 (472 ft)	34	2018	Residential	
9	Torre Vía del Bosque	—	Zapopan	142 (465 ft)	39	2024	Residential	
10	Andares Corporativo Paseo		Zapopan	140.7 (461 ft)	29	2017	Office	
11	Lobby 33		Zapopan	140 (459 ft)	32	2019	Mixed-use	
12	The District Torre 1	—	Guadalajara	140 (459 ft)	30	2025	Residential	
13	Americas 1254 Americas 1500 Torre 500		Guadalajara	135.4 (442 ft)	30	2018	Mixed-use	
14	Ópera Torre Poniente	—	Zapopan	130 (426 ft)	33	2025	Residential	
15	Hard Rock Hotel Guadalajara	—	Zapopan	130 (426 ft)	30	2018	Hotel	
16	Central Park Corporativo		Zapopan	127.5 (418 ft)	29	2017	Office	
17	Legacy Tower		Zapopan	127 (416 ft)	26	2024	Residential	
18	Corporativo Torre Cube 2	—	Zapopan	124.4 (406 ft	26	2013	Office	
19	Torre Niba	—	Guadalajara	124.2 (406 ft)	29	2019	Mixed-use	
20	Américas 1500 Torre 1000	—	Guadalajara	122.5 (400 ft)	28	2016	Mixed-use	
21	Condominios Country Club	—	Guadalajara	120 (393 ft)	34	2014	Residential	
22	Attala Tower Living	—	Zapopan	118 (387 ft)	29	2017	Residential	
23	Icon 23 Business Circle		Zapopan	116.4 (380 ft)	25	2010	Office	
24	Tres60 Acueducto Torre Sur	—	Zapopan	115 (377 ft)	28	2008	Residential	
25	Torre Titanium		Zapopan	115 (377 ft)	29	2007	Residential	
26	Aura Lofts	—	Zapopan	111 (364 ft)	31	2007	Residential	
27	Alaya Tower Living	—	Zapopan	110 (360 ft)	24	2013	Residential	
28	Heritage Grand Tower Guadalajara	—	Zapopan	110 (360 ft)	28	2009	Residential	
29	Tres60 Acueducto Torre Norte	—	Zapopan	110 (360 ft)	27	2008	Residential	
30	Elysian High Country	—	Guadalajara	110 (360 ft)	26	2025	Mixed-use	
31	Centro Médico Puerta de Hierro	—	Zapopan	110 (360 ft)	26	2005	Hospital	
32	Condominio Guadalajara	—	Guadalajara	110 (360 ft)	26	1963	Office	
33	JW Marriot		Guadalajara	105 (344 ft)	23	2016	Hotel	
34	Nomad Las Americas	—	Guadalajara	105 (344 ft)	26	2024	Residential	
35	Entorno México	—	Guadalajara	105 (344 ft)	25	2025	Mixed-use	
36	Torre Aura Puerta de Hierro	—	Zapopan	105 (344 ft)	26	2008	Residential	
37	Ópera Torre Central	—	Zapopan	105 (344 ft)	26	2025	Residential	
38	Corporativo Torre Zapopan	—	Zapopan	105 (344 ft)	21	2009	Office	
39	Torre MM		Guadalajara	103 (337 ft)	28	2025	Residential	
40	Américas 1501	—	Guadalajara	103 (337 ft)	24	2009	Mixed-use	
41	Corporativo Country Club	—	Guadalajara	100 (328 ft)	22	2015	Office	
42	The Landmark Guadalajara Torre 2	—	Zapopan	100 (328 ft)	19	2018	Office	

== Tallest under construction ==
The following table ranks high-rise buildings under construction in Guadalajara that are expected to reach an height of at least 100 m (328 ft) when complete.

Rank	Building	City	Height (m)	Floors	Year	Notes
1	Legend Tower	Zapopan	190	52	2029	
2	ALAC	Zapopan	168	30	–	
3	Vianto 1331	Guadalajara	164	42	2025	
4	Be Grand Country Torre 3	Guadalajara	160	44	2029	
5	Be Grand Country Torre 2	Guadalajara	145	39	2028	
6	The District Torre 2	Guadalajara	135	29	2027	
7	Via Aurora	Guadalajara	135	35	2028	
8	The One Avenue Towers Torre Poniente	Zapopan	130	31	2027	
9	Espacio Chapalita Style	Guadalajara	130	33	2028	
10	Be Grand Country Torre 1	Guadalajara	130	35	2027	
11	Waldorf Astoria Residences	Zapopan	128	31	2029	
12	Iqono Parq Torre D	Zapopan	125	29	2028	
13	Iqono Parq Torre C	Zapopan	120	28	2028	
14	Chapultepec 427	Guadalajara	118	27	2026	
15	Niza Residences Torre 1	Zapopan	110	25	2027	
16	Niza Residences Torre 2	Zapopan	110	25	2027	
17	The One Avenue Towers Torre Oriente	Zapopan	105	23	2027	
18	Iqono Parq Torre A	Zapopan	100	22	2027	
19	Iqono Parq Torre B	Zapopan	100	22	2027	
