= The First Group (company) =

Real Estate Dealer and Hospitality Company in the United Arab Emirates

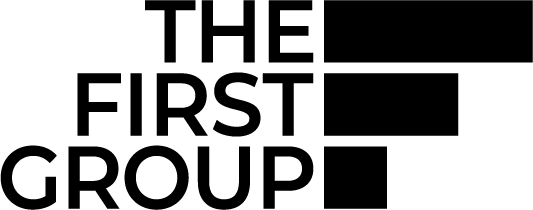
- Industry: Hospitality, Real Estate
- Founded: 2005
- Headquarters: Dubai, United Arab Emirates
- Area served: United Arab Emirates
- Key people: Rob Burns (CEO)
- Website: thefirstgroup.com

The First Group is a real estate developer and hospitality company based in Dubai. It operates residential apartments, hotels, and food and beverage outlets in the United Arab Emirates, including seven hotels.

== History ==
The First Group was founded in 2005 as a property development company in Dubai, focused on developing and operating apartment buildings. The company eventually expanded and began operating hotels and hotel apartments.

In July 2016, Economic and Financial Crimes Commission (EFCC) sealed the Abuja office of TFG Real Estate, The First Group's Nigerian agent, during an investigation into the sale of Dubai properties to Nigerian investors. EFCC alleged that the instalment terms allowed the company to retain payments already made when purchasers defaulted.

In June 2018, the National Industrial Court of Nigeria to pay a former property consultant ₦50,000 in lieu of notice, ₦2.5 million in damages and ₦300,000 in legal costs. The court found that she had experienced physical harassment, workplace discrimination and false imprisonment, and that her employment had been terminated without adequate notice.

In July 2023, Aurum (Cayman), the obligor of a sukuk issued by TFG Sukuk I, announced that liquidity constraints would prevent it from making a scheduled $27 million principal payment in full. It proposed extending the repayment period of the $135 million sukuk and later entered into an interim standstill agreement with holders representing more than 75 percent of the outstanding certificates. The company paid the scheduled profit payment and $2 million of the principal due in August 2023. In May 2025, creditors approved a restructuring that extended the sukuk's maturity from August 2024 to 20 August 2026 and introduced additional security, covenant and monitoring provisions.

== Projects ==
=== The First Collection ===
In 2021, The First Group launched its hospitality brand The First Collection. The first hotel under the brand was The First Collection at Jumeirah Village Circle. The hotel has 491 rooms.

In May 2024, The First Collection at Jumeirah Village Circle joined the Tribute Portfolio. Part of the Marriott Bonvoy collection.

The second hotel was The First Collection Business Bay. The First Collection Business Bay has 437 rooms and suites. The First Collection Waterfront opened in November 2023. The First Collection Waterfront has 327 rooms and suites. The First Collection Waterfront is the third hotel under The First Collection Portfolio brand.

=== Ciel Dubai Marina ===
At 365 metres and 82 storeys, the building is projected to be the tallest hotel in the world upon completion. Ciel Dubai Marina will have more than 1,000 hotel rooms and suites and the total project value is US$ 544.3 million. Ciel Dubai Marina is designed by the architectural firm, NORR Group. And is being constructed by The First Group’s chief development partner, China Railway Construction Corporation. Ciel Dubai Marina has been awarded these titles: 2019 International Property Awards (IPA) for Best International Hotel Architecture and Best Hotel Architecture Arabia and Best High-rise Architecture More than 11,800 cubic metres of concrete and over 3,000 tonnes of steel has been used in the building’s foundations. The building includes a 300-meter-tall atrium with vertically stacked, naturally ventilated terraces. As of March 2023, the superstructure was reported to be 99% complete. The conveyor system installation was 53% complete, tiling was 66% complete, and wall partitions and plastering were 97% complete. The installation of steel trusses in the atrium had also been finished.

== See also ==
- List of companies of the United Arab Emirates
