= Ciel Dubai Marina =

Skyscraper in Dubai, United Arab Emirates

- سيل دبي مارينا
- Interactive map of the Ciel Dubai Marina area
- Alternative names: S Residence by Immo; Immo Prestige Residential Tower
- Hotel chain: Vignette Collection

General information
- Status: Completed
- Type: Hotel
- Location: Dubai Marina, Dubai, United Arab Emirates
- Coordinates: 25.08744°N 55.14454°E
- Construction started: 2018; 8 years ago
- Completed: 17 November 2025
- Opening: 1 December 2025
- Owner: Immo Prestige Limited
- Operator: IHG Hotels & Resorts

Height
- Architectural: 377 m (1,237 ft)
- Observatory: 355 m (1,165 ft)

Technical details
- Material: Steel and concrete
- Floor count: 82
- Floor area: 103,000 m^{2} (1,110,000 sq ft)

Design and construction
- Architect: Yahya Jan
- Architecture firm: NORR Group Consultants International Limited
- Developer: The First Group
- Main contractor: China Railway 18th Bureau Group LLC

Other information
- Number of rooms: 1,004
- Number of suites: 147

Website
- www.cieldubai.com

The Ciel Dubai Marina is a skyscraper hotel in Dubai, United Arab Emirates. With a structural height exceeding 377 metres (1,237 ft), it is the tallest hotel-only building in the world.

== Architecture and Design ==
The skyscraper is designed by NORR Group. The sculptural design features tapers in both the upper and lower sections, a silver façade, and graceful recesses at the apex. Planned amenities include a restaurant, rooftop bar, and an infinity pool.

The building will include 1,042 rooms, comprising 150 suites, distributed across 82 floors. The foundation is constructed using approximately 12,000 cubic metres (420,000 cu ft) of concrete and over 2,700 tonnes (3,000 short tons) of steel.

Originally, the completion was scheduled for 2023, with plans for opening in 2024. The developer, The First Group, has indicated that the hotel would open at the end of 2025.

== Operations & Management ==
Ciel Dubai Marina is operated by The First Group Hospitality, a division of The First Group, and is part of IHG Hotels & Resorts' Vignette Collection brand. The division oversees the hotel's day-to-day management and operational functions. The First Group Hospitality also coordinated the hotel's opening in November 2025, when the property welcomed its first guests and was the world's tallest hotel at the time of launch.

== Sustainability Features ==
The Ciel Dubai Marina has integrated several sustainability initiatives within its design. The building will feature energy-efficient systems, rainwater harvesting capabilities, and green roofs to promote biodiversity and reduce urban heat. This focus on sustainability reflects Dubai's commitment to becoming a more eco-friendly city.

== See also ==
- List of tallest buildings in the United Arab Emirates
- List of tallest buildings in Dubai
- List of hotels in Dubai
- List of tallest hotels

Records
| Preceded by Gevora Hotel | World's tallest hotel 1,237 feet (377 m); 2025–present | Incumbent |
