= Business Bay =

Business Bay الخليج التجاري
- Community
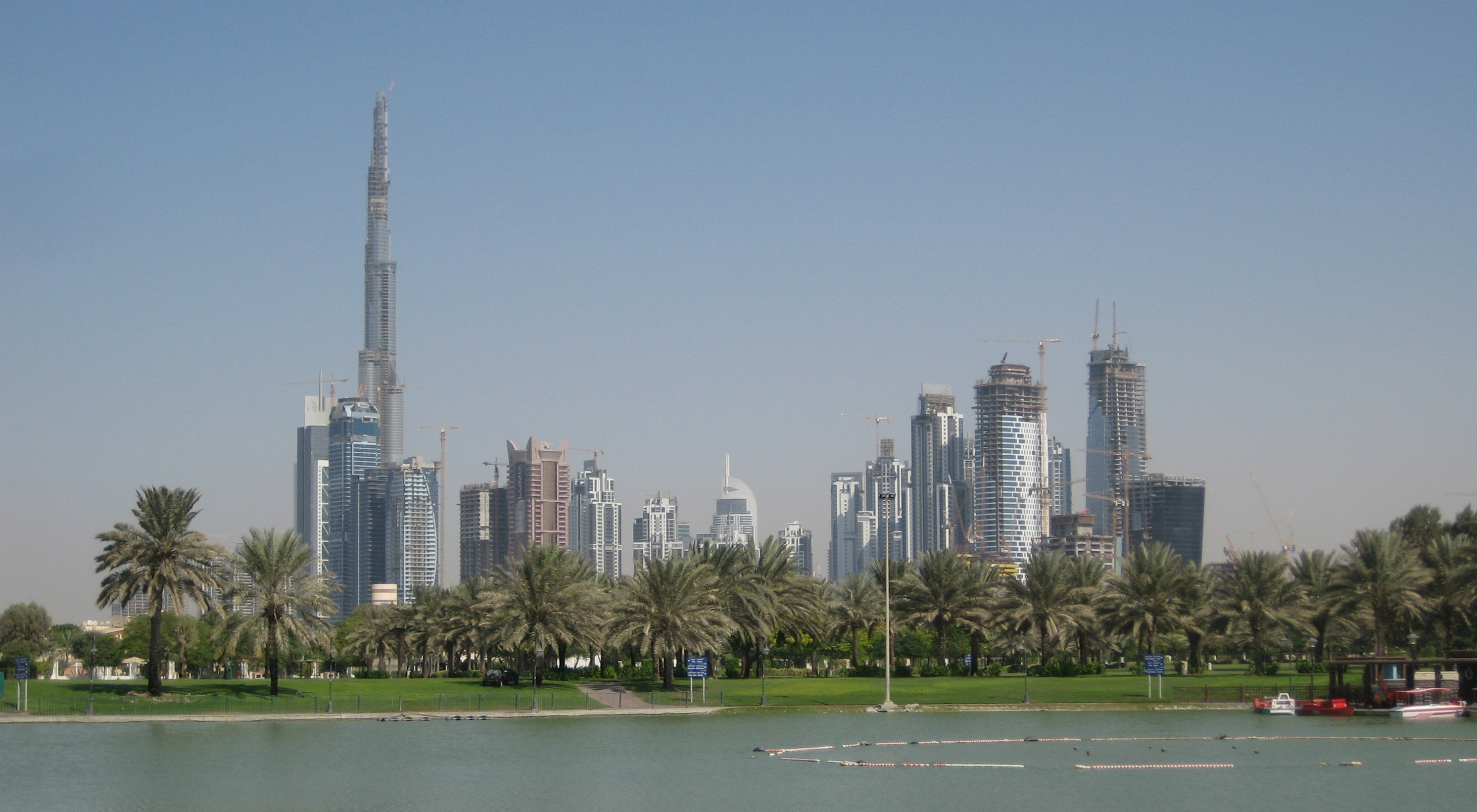
- Skyline of Business Bay, Dubai as seen from Safa Park.
- Interactive map of Business Bay
- Coordinates: 25.18366°N 55.26664°E
- Country: United Arab Emirates
- Emirate: Dubai
- City: Dubai
- Established: 2003

Area
  - Total: 4.36 km^{2} (1.68 sq mi)

Population (expected)
  - Total: 191,000
  - Density: 43,800/km^{2} (113,000/sq mi)
- This project is currently under development

Business Bay (Arabic: الخليج التجاري: Al-Khaleej Al-Tijari) is a central business district under construction in Dubai, United Arab Emirates. The project features numerous skyscrapers located in an area where Dubai Creek has been dredged and extended, and located immediately south of Downtown Dubai. Business Bay will have upwards of 240 buildings, comprising commercial and residential developments. The infrastructure of Business Bay has been completed in 2008, and the entire development was expected to be completed between 2012 and 2015.

Business Bay is part of the vision of Sheikh Mohammed Bin Rashed Al Maktoum, UAE Vice President, Prime Minister, Minister of Defence, and Ruler of Dubai. Business Bay will be a new 'city' within the city of Dubai and is being built as a commercial, residential and business cluster along a new extension of Dubai Creek extending from Ras Al Khor to Sheikh Zayed Road. Covering an area of 64,000,000 square feet (5,900,000 m^{2}), it is composed of office and residential towers set in landscaped gardens with a network of roads, pathways and canals.

== Development ==
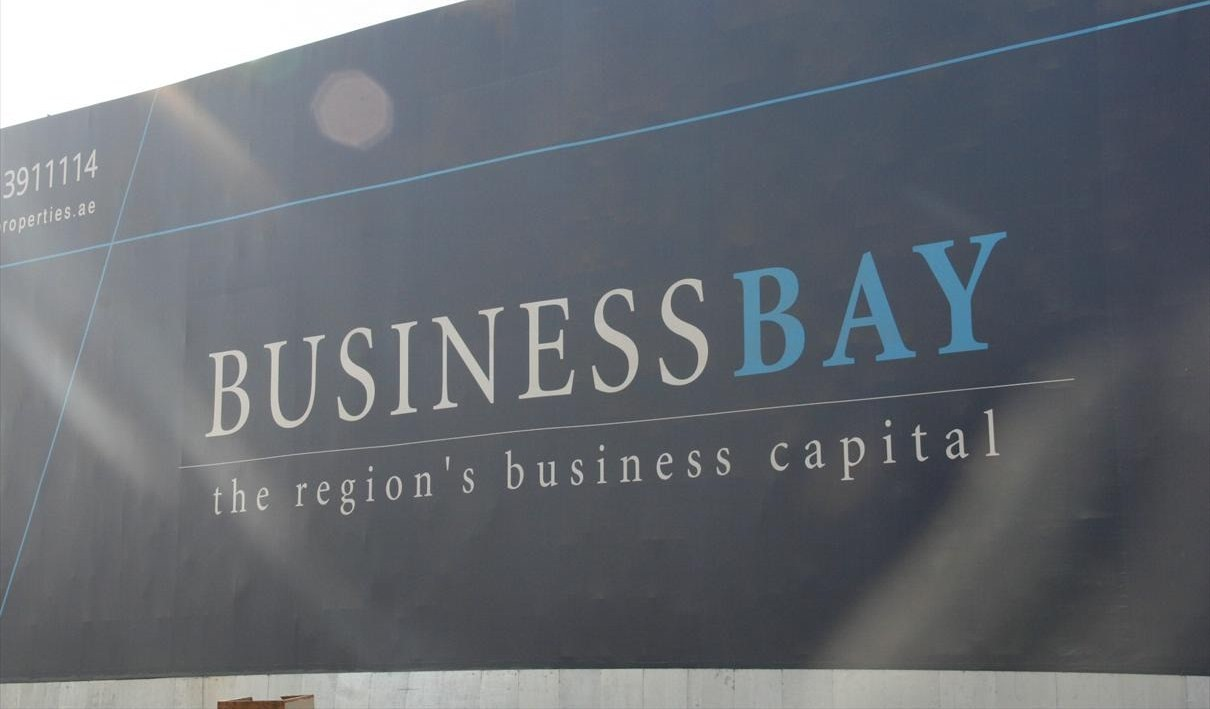
Business Bay, Dubai

The entire development covers an area of 46,900,000 sq ft (4,360,000 m^{2}), and the gross leasable area is 78,500,000 sq ft (7,290,000 m^{2}). The projected population of the entire development is more than 191,000, and the estimated population of employers and others is 110,000, making the total population more than 300,000. Commercial development will comprise 2,653,244 sq ft (246,494.4 m^{2}), which is 18.5 percent of the entire development; mixed use development will comprise 8,520,368 square feet (791,568.1 m^{2}) (59.4 percent); and residential development will cover 3,163,628 sq ft (293,910.7 m^{2}) (22.1 percent). Business Bay will cost AED 110 billion (US$30 billion).

== Bay Square ==
Bay Square is a single-use community within Business Bay. The entire development will be a pedestrian-only zone, and will include walkways over canals. It will cover over 2,400,000 square feet (220,000 m^{2}) and will be located 1 km (0.62 mi) away from Sheikh Zayed Road within Business Bay. When completed it will comprise canals, sidewalks, restaurants, cafes and retail stores. It will have 1,600,000 sq ft (150,000 m^{2}) of office space; Bay Square will host numerous small and medium-sized enterprises. When Bay Square completes there will be approximately 575 offices with an average size of 2,000 sq ft (190 m^{2}). Bay Square was expected to be completed in 2010. It will comprise the following buildings:

- Bay Square Commercial Building
- Bay Square Hotel
- Bay Square Office Building (10 Office Buildings in total)
- Bay Square Residential Building

== The Executive Towers ==
The Executive Towers at Business Bay consist of 12 towers, which includes residential, commercial and office towers. These are the first buildings to be completed in Business Bay and are located near its entrance. A three-storey podium connects all the towers in addition to the nearby Vision Tower, which is going to be connected by a special passage.

== Escape ==
Escape Tower is adjacent to the Business Bay Metro Station Land Side. It consists of residential apartments with a total of 40 floors above the ground. The building is accompanied with a gym and a swimming pool. A designated parking building is close the Tower and is inter connected with each other by a walking bridge.

== Upside Living ==
Upside Living By SRG is a high-end residential development located in the heart of Business Bay, one of the most sought-after business and residential areas of Dubai. This project offers luxury apartments with views of Dubai Canal and Dubai skyline. The apartments are available in a range of configurations, including studio, one, two, and three-bedroom units. Another luxury project has landed in the city with MAG and it's brand 'Keturah' which has taken the form of a high-rise, with apartment spaces ranging from 600 square feet to 2,200 square feet.

== Bay Avenue ==
Bay Avenue is an arena of two levels of indoor and outdoor retail space. It will have cafes, restaurants, boutiques, showrooms, plazas, children's play areas and sporting facilities. However, nearly two years after completion, the first couple of shops are only nearing completion.

== Dubai Creek Extension ==
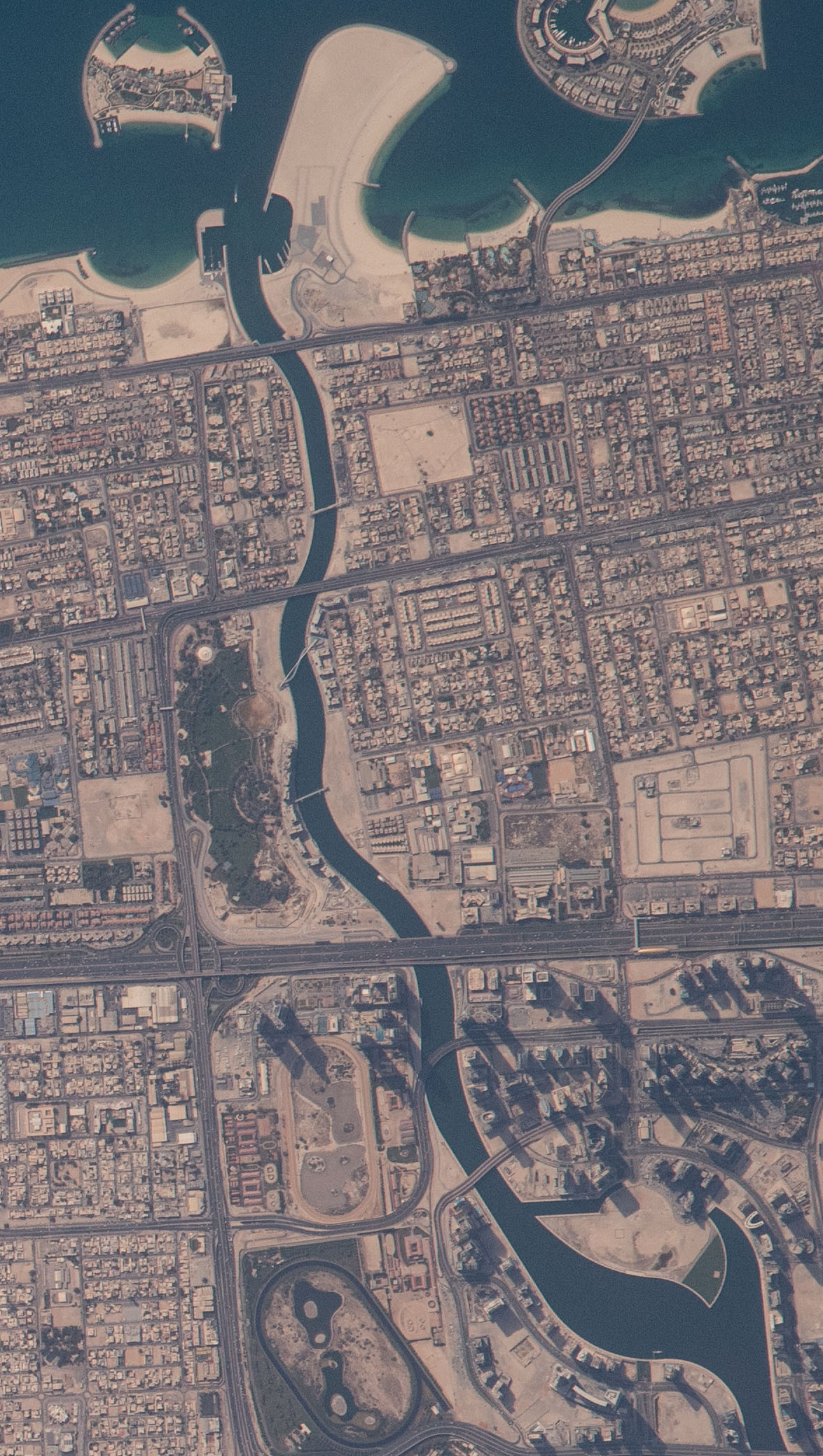
Coast, Dubai Water Canal and nearby Safa Park (photo, ISS)

Dubai Creek Extension is a part of the Business Bay development. The plan involves the expansion of the current 14 km (8.7 mi) long Dubai Creek to 26.2 km (16.3 mi). Dubai Creek will be extended from its original place to Business Bay to the Persian Gulf through Safa Park and Jumeirah. The project will be carried out in three phases. Completion was scheduled for 2007, but is now expected by the end of 2010. Some 10 kilometres of the total 12.2 kilometres of the Dubai Creek extension work has already been completed in Business Bay.

== Hotels in Business Bay ==
Business Bay has a wide range of premium hotels to appeal to both business and leisure travelers. The main attraction in the area is the famous JW Marriott Marquis Dubai, the 2nd tallest hotel in the world. Other well-known hotels include the Steigenberger Hotel, Radisson Blu Hotel Waterfront, Taj Dubai, Doubletree by Hilton Dubai Business Bay, V Hotel Dubai, and Curio Collection by Hilton.

== Transportation ==
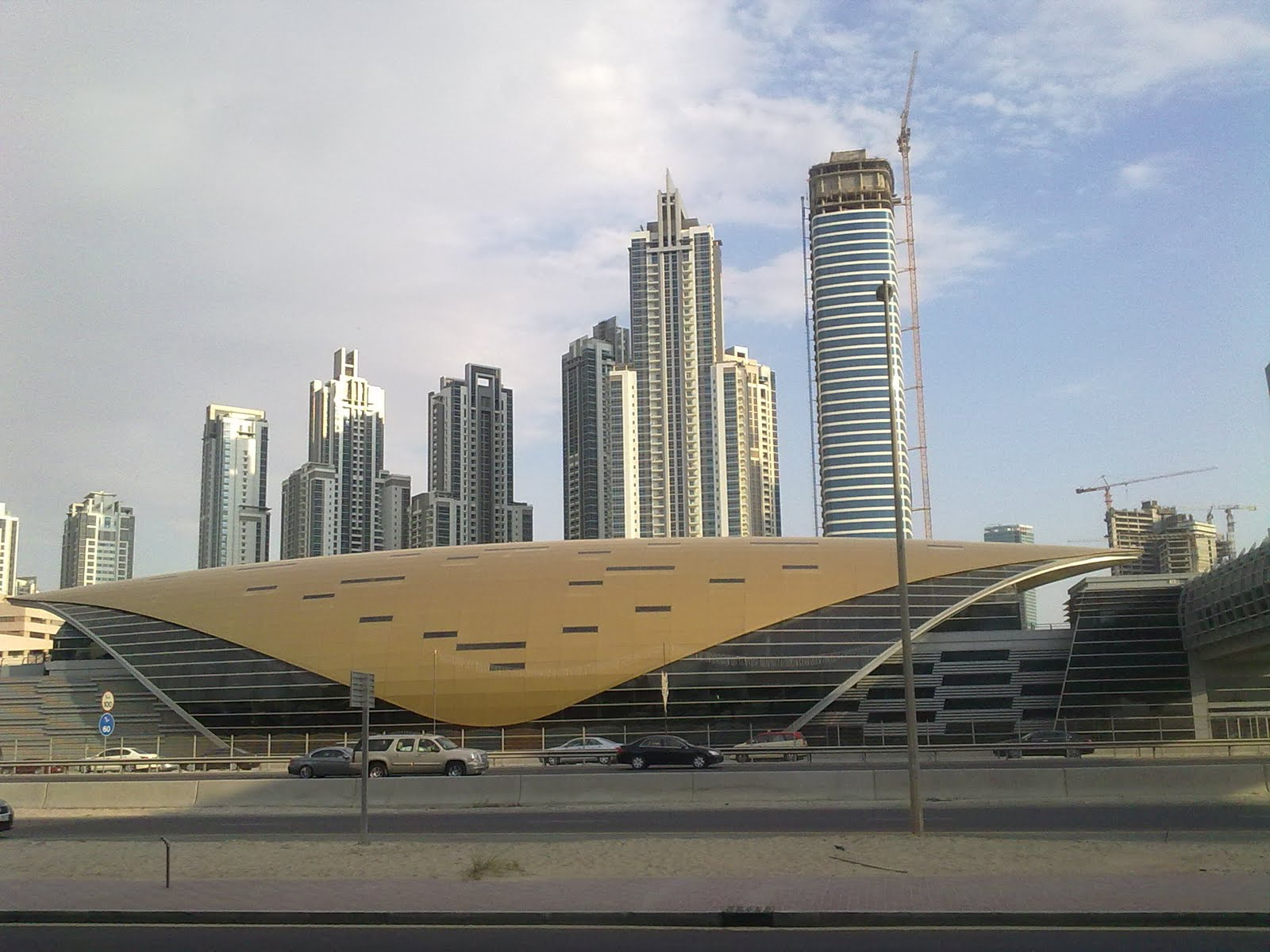
Dubai Metro Station of Business Bay

Business Bay is connected to Red Line of Dubai Metro with Burj Khalifa and Dubai Mall stations and the Business Bay Station, which opened on 15 October 2010, together with 4 other stations of the Dubai Metro's Red Line.

== Planned Buildings ==
There will be over 230 towers in the Business Bay district. This list has 32 projects, covering 44 individual towers.

Eywa Tree of Life, a residential building by the developer R.Evolution on the Dubai Water Canal, has been under construction since October 2023. The project is targeting LEED Platinum and WELL Platinum certification. A second development under the same name, Eywa Way of Water, was announced in January 2026.

=== List of Completed Buildings ===
JW Marriott Marquis Dubai are the tallest building in Business Bay, and tallest hotel in the world

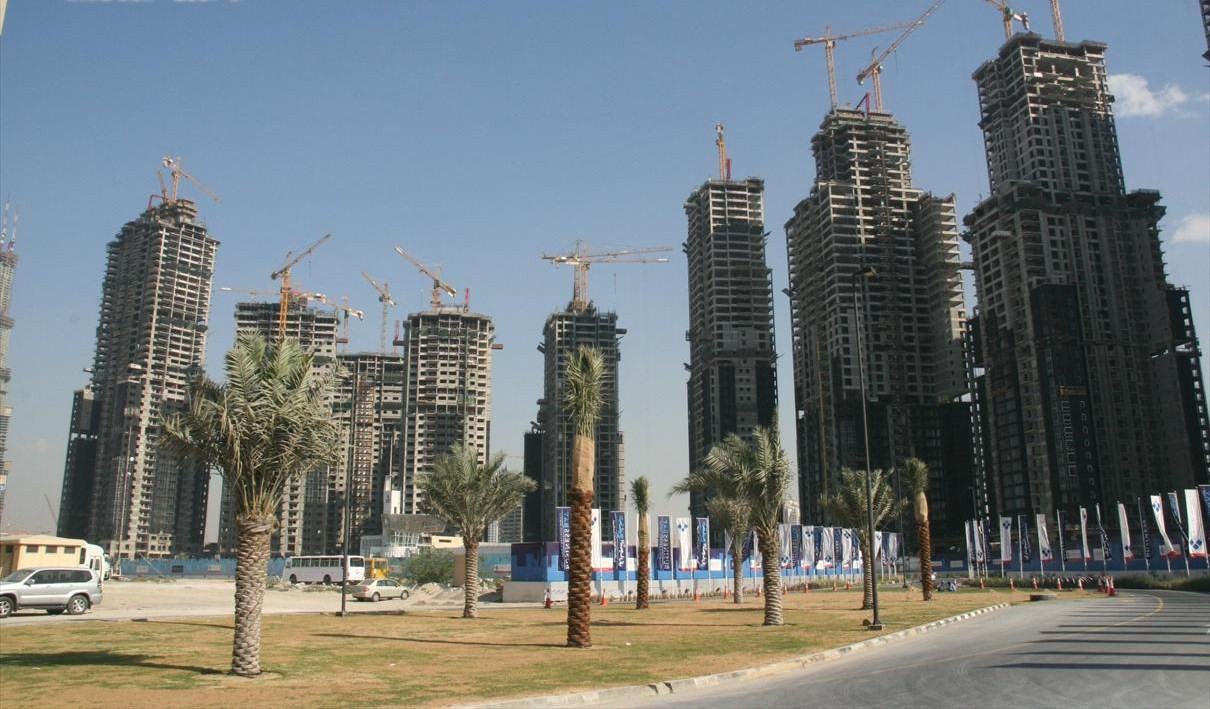
Executive Towers under construction

Rank	Name	Height m (ft)	Floors	Year	Notes
1	JW Marriott Marquis Dubai Tower 1	355 (1,165)	77	2012	Tallest hotel in the world.
2	JW Marriott Marquis Dubai Tower 2	355 (1,165)	77	2012	
3	Amna Tower	307 (1,007)	75	2020	
4	Noora Tower	307 (1,007)	75	2019	
5	Ubora Tower 1	263 (862)	58	2011	
6	Vision Tower	260 (853)	60	2008	
7	Churchill Residence	235 (771)	61	2010	
8	The Bay Gate	221 (725)	53	2012	Construction is finished – building topped out in 2008.
9	Meera Tower	213 (699)	52	2020	
10	Executive Tower M	208 (683)	52	2009	
11	The Citadel	201 (659)	48	2008	
12	Horizon Tower	190 (623)	45	2006	
13	Platinum Tower	190 (623)	44	2012	
14	Executive Tower B	188 (618)	47	2008	
15	Lake Terrace	187 (614)	40	2008	
16	Sidra Tower	187 (614)	45	2009	
17	City Premiere Hotel Apartments	186 (611)	45	2011	
18	Bay Central 2*	180 (591)	50	2012	Under construction – building was topped out in 2012.
19	Mazaya Business Avenue 1	180 (591)	50	2011	
20	Mazaya Business Avenue 2	180 (591)	50	2011	
21	Bay Central 2	180 (591)	40	2012	Under construction - building was topped out in 2011.
22	Mazaya Business Avenue 3	180 (591)	50	2011	
23	Al Manara	163 (534)	35	2011	

* indicates building is still under construction, but has been topped out

==== Other low-rise buildings ====
- Sobha Sapphire
- Iris Bay
- The Prism
- One Business Bay
- Falcon Tower
- The Regal Tower
- The Court
- Park Lane Tower
- Sky Tower 1
- The Oberoi Business Bay
- Bayswater
- O14
- Crystal Tower
- Ontario Tower
- The Conclave
- The Binary
- Opal Tower
- Business Tower
- West Bay Tower
- XL Tower
- Opus Building
- B2B Tower

== Gallery ==
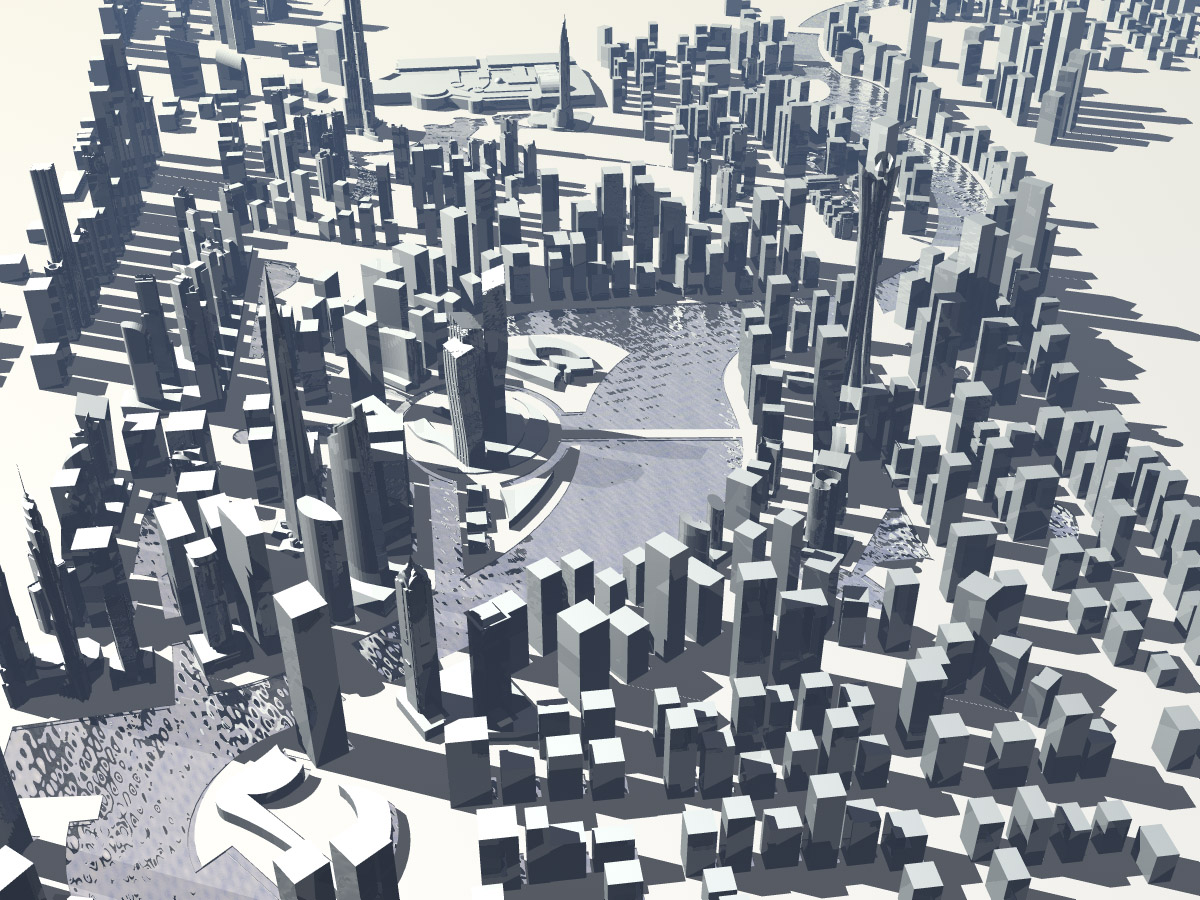
Conceptual Image of Business Bay

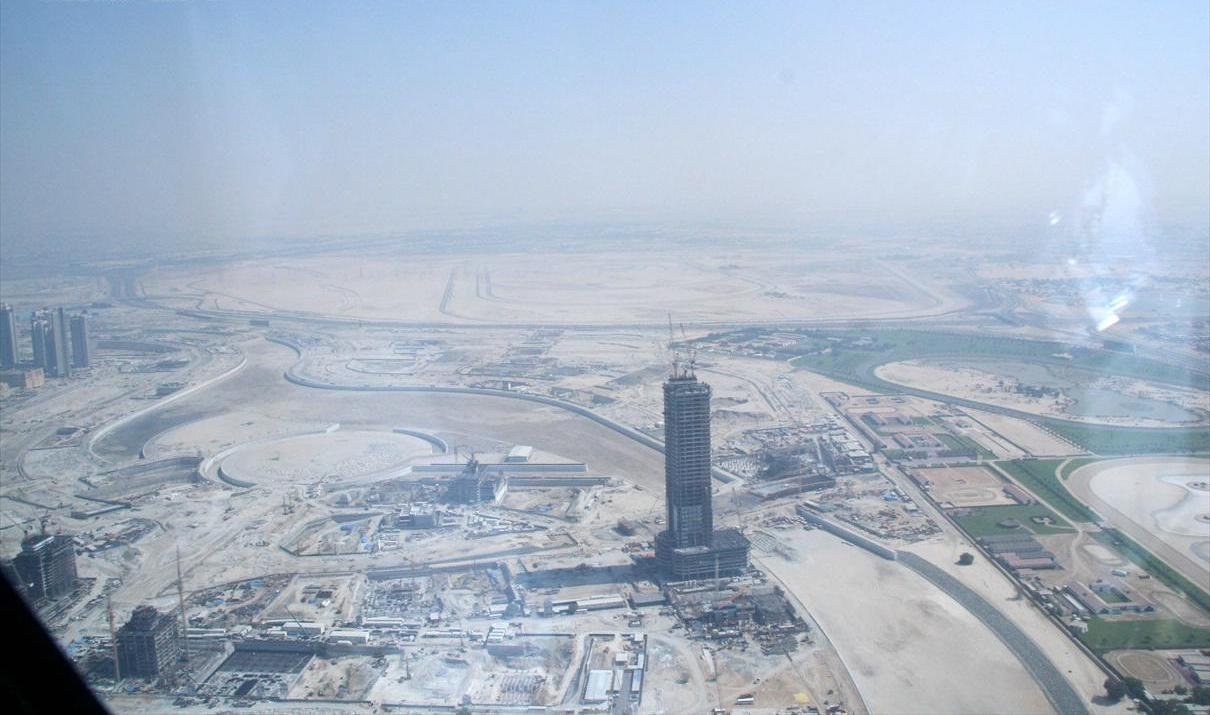
Business Bay plot area before construction

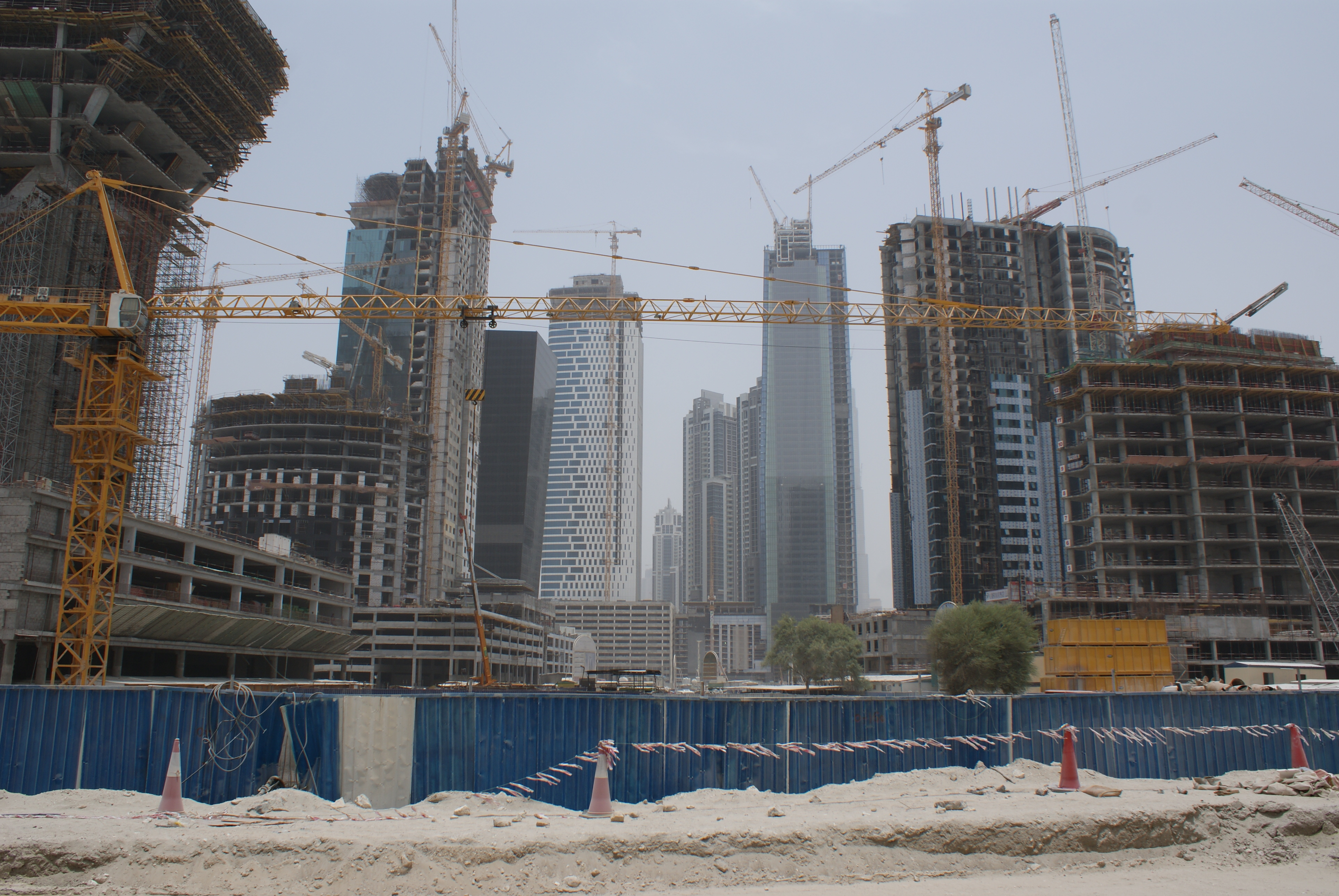
Construction in Business Bay

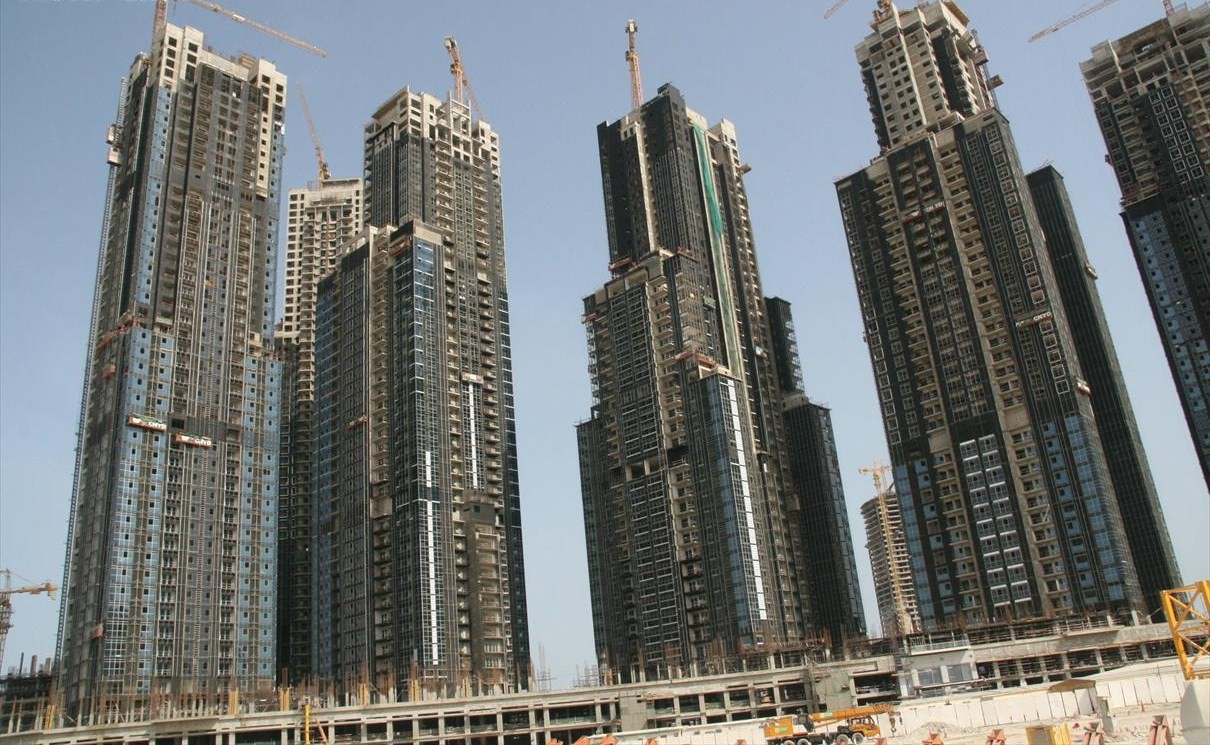
Executive Towers under construction in June, 2007

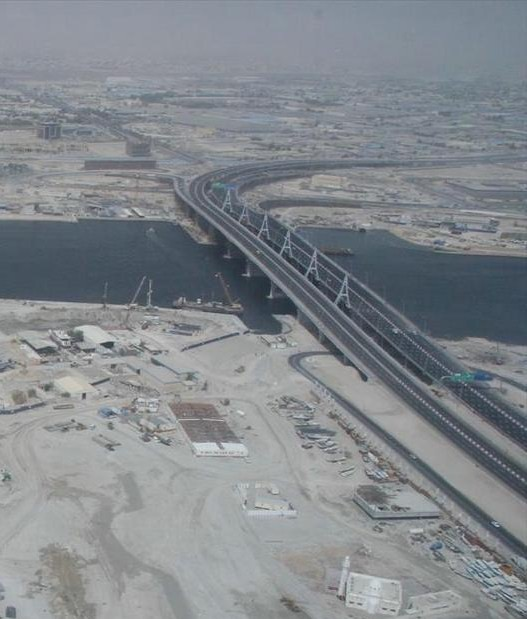
Business Bay crossing bridge

== See also ==
- Al Habtoor City
- DAMAC Towers by Paramount Hotels & Resorts
- Dubai Properties
