= Radisson Royal Dubai =

Skyscraper and hotel complex located in Dubai,

- Interactive map of the Radisson Royal Dubai area

General information
- Status: Completed
- Type: Hotel
- Location: Dubai, United Arab Emirates
- Coordinates: 25.2234177°N 55.2823142°E
- Opening: 2010

Height
- Roof: 886 ft (270 m)

Technical details
- Floor count: 60

Design and construction
- Architect: Bothe Richter Teherani Architekten BDA

Radisson Royal Dubai is a skyscraper and hotel complex located in Dubai, United Arab Emirates. The 60 story building was completed in 2010, construction having started in 2005, and houses a Radisson hotel. The modernist concrete building is located on 26 Sheikh Zayed Road. The hotel contains 471 rooms, and is located close to Dubai International Airport, Dubai International Financial Center, and Dubai World Trade Center.

== See also ==
- Skyscraper design and construction
- List of tallest hotels in the world
