= 1717 Broadway =

Hotel skyscraper in Manhattan, New York

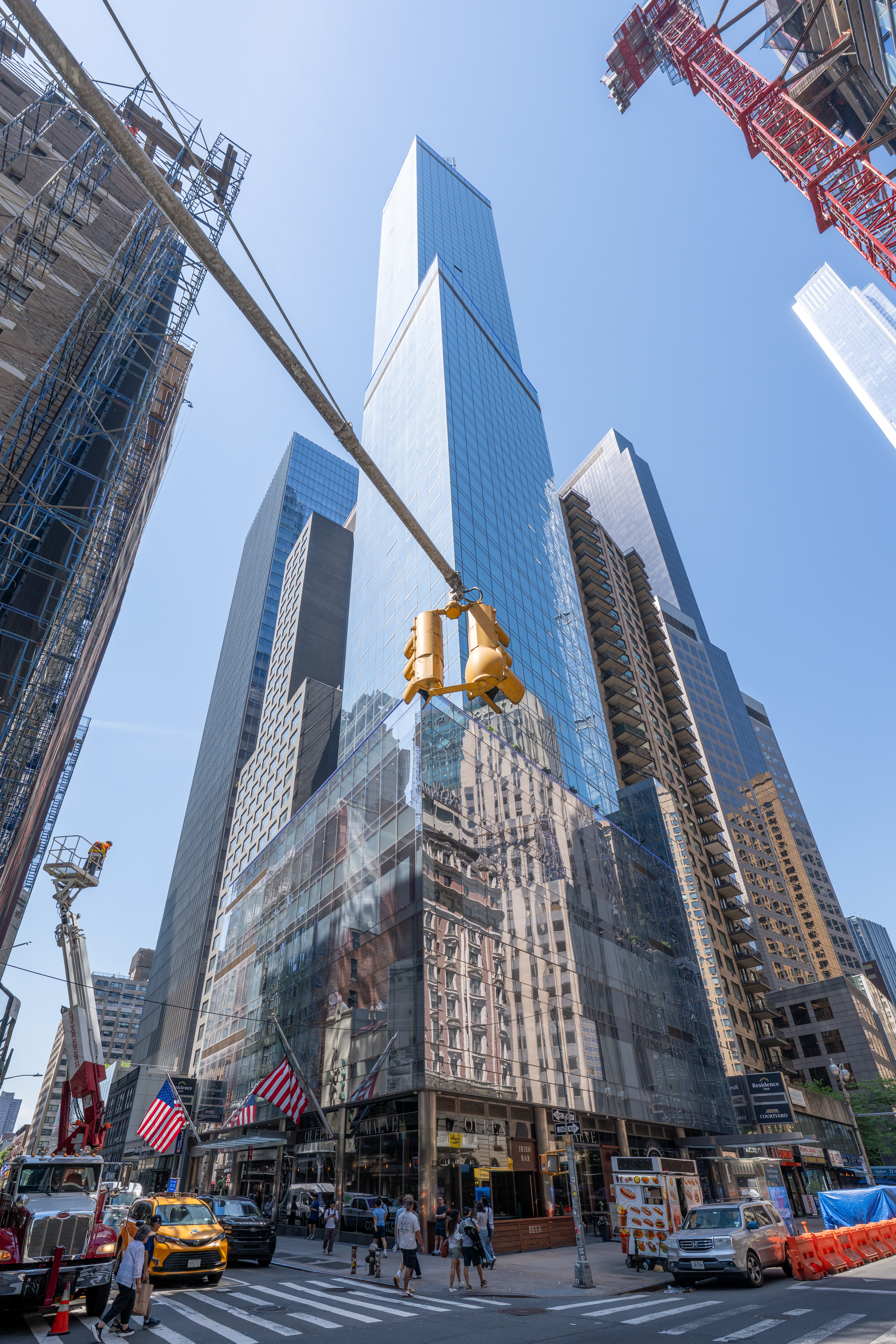
- Seen in 2026
- Interactive map of the 1717 Broadway area

General information
- Status: Completed
- Type: Hotel
- Location: 1717 Broadway
- Coordinates: 40.7644°N 73.9826°W
- Construction started: 2011
- Completed: 2013
- Owner: Granite Broadway LLC

Height
- Antenna spire: 229.79 m (754 ft)
- Roof: 218 m (715 ft)

Technical details
- Floor count: 68
- Floor area: 340,000 ft^{2} (31,587 m^{2})

Design and construction
- Architect: Nobutaka Ashihara
- Developer: Granite Broadway LLC

1717 Broadway is a skyscraper in the Midtown Manhattan neighborhood of New York City. At 750 feet (230 m) high, it is the tallest hotel in North America. The building contains two hotels, the Courtyard New York Manhattan/Central Park below the 35th floor and the Residence Inn New York Manhattan/Central Park on floors 35 and higher, with a total of 639 rooms. The glass-clad building is on the northwest corner of 54th Street and Broadway.

== See also ==
- List of tallest buildings in New York City
- List of tallest hotels in the world
