= Al Habtoor City =

Mixed-use development complex in Dubai, United Arab Emirates

- View of Al Habtoor City from the Dubai Water Canal
- Interactive map of the Al Habtoor City area

General information
- Status: Completed
- Type: Mixed-use
- Architectural style: Modern
- Location: Business Bay, Dubai, United Arab Emirates
- Coordinates: 25.1867°N 55.2636°E
- Construction started: 2012
- Completed: 2018
- Opening: 2018
- Owner: Al Habtoor Group

Technical details
- Floor count: 75 (Noora & Amna towers), 52 (Meera tower)
- Floor area: 390,000 m^{2}

Design and construction
- Architects: Khatib and Alami (hotels), WS Atkins (residential towers)
- Developer: Al Habtoor Group
- Main contractor: Habtoor Leighton Group

Website
- www.alhabtoorcity.com

Al Habtoor City is a large-scale, mixed-use development located in Business Bay, Dubai, United Arab Emirates. Developed by the Al Habtoor Group, the complex comprises three residential skyscrapers and three luxury hotels. Positioned along the Dubai Water Canal, the project combines upscale living, hospitality, and entertainment facilities.

== Development ==
Construction of Al Habtoor City commenced in 2012 and reached completion in 2018, representing a total investment of approximately US$3 billion. The residential component consists of three high-rise towers: Noora Tower and Amna Tower, each standing at 75 floors, and Meera Tower with 52 floors. Collectively, these towers provide over 1,400 residential units, including twelve ultra-luxury penthouses.

== Hotels ==
The development features three luxury hotels, all of which underwent rebranding in 2018. The Al Habtoor Palace, formerly operating as the St. Regis Dubai, now forms part of the Preferred Hotels & Resorts Legend Collection. The complex also includes the V Hotel Dubai, operating under Hilton's Curio Collection, and the Hilton Dubai Al Habtoor City.

== Amenities ==
Al Habtoor City offers comprehensive amenities including La Perle by Dragone, a permanent aquatic theatre production with 1,300 seats. The development features a professional tennis academy with climate-controlled courts, 27,000 square meters of landscaped gardens, and parking facilities accommodating approximately 5,000 vehicles.

== Al Habtoor Tower ==
In 2023, Al Habtoor Group announced the adjacent Al Habtoor Tower project, an 81-storey residential skyscraper designed to rank among the world's tallest residential buildings. The tower will contain 1,701 residential units and is being developed to meet LEED Platinum environmental certification standards.

== See also ==
- List of tallest buildings in Dubai
- Business Bay
