= Khalaf Ahmad Al Habtoor Foundation =

UAE-based charitable organization

Khalaf Ahmad Al Habtoor Foundation مؤسسة خلف أحمد الحبتور للأعمال الخيرية
- Formation: 2013
- Type: Nonprofit
- Headquarters: Al Habtoor Group Head Office, Dubai
- Location: UAE
- Website: kahfoundation.org

Khalaf Ahmad Al Habtoor Foundation (Arabic: مؤسسة خلف أحمد الحبتور للأعمال الخيرية) is a UAE-based charitable organization, launched in January 2013 by Khalaf Al Habtoor, Chairman of the Al Habtoor Group.

The headquarters of the group are at the Al Farooq Omar Bin Al Khattab Mosque and Centre, Al Safa, Jumeirah.

== Campaigns ==
In 2016, the Foundation initiated its Ramadan campaign in Lebanon. The first stage of the program resulted in the foundation delivering 5,100 food packages to families in need across the country. Beneficiaries of their support included the Al Hrar Hospital. Additionally, they distributed food across the country, but also to the Lebanese Arab Crescent.

In 2014 the Foundation has launched campaigns to provide humanitarian aid to support Syrian Refugees in Lebanon and support Palestine Refugees in Lebanon. The Foundation also provided assistance to Lebanese Families & Syrian refugees in Lebanon. In 2013 the Foundation assisted Christian Syrian families in Lebanon and distributed 14,000 portions of aid for Syrian refugees in Lebanon.

== Other initiatives ==
- Launch of the Jurisprudence Abstract under the Auspices of the Khalaf Ahmad Al Habtoor Foundation
- Support for the Khalaf Ahmad Al Habtoor Award for Qur'an & Sunnah 2014
- Distribution Ramadan Food Parcels in 2014
- Funding for the extension of the Al Shura Mosque in Jordan
- Support for the launch of the Encyclopedia of the Mosques of the United Arab Emirates
