= The Walk, Dubai =

The Walk
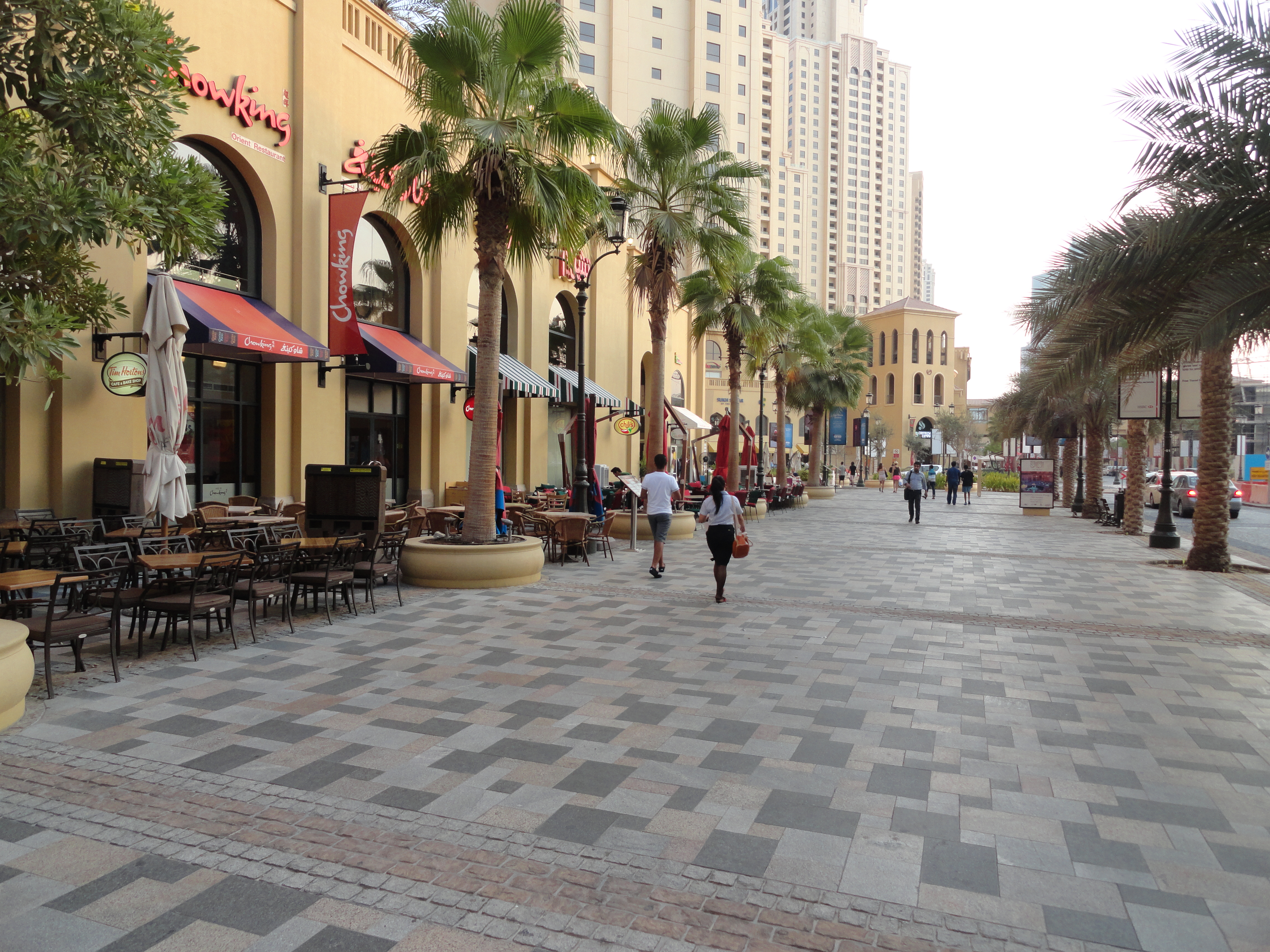
- Location: Jumeirah Beach Residence, Dubai, United Arab Emirates
- Coordinates: 25°04′38.00″N 55°08′05.53″E
- Opened: August 2008
- Developer: Dubai Properties Group
- Manager: DP Asset Management (Member of Dubai Properties Group)
- Owner: Dubai Properties Group
- Num. of stores: 330+
- Website: thewalk.ae

The Walk at Jumeirah Beach Residence is a 1.7-kilometre strip located at the ground and plaza level of the Jumeirah Beach Residence complex in Dubai, United Arab Emirates. Developed by Dubai Properties Group, it was completed in 2007 and officially opened in August 2008.

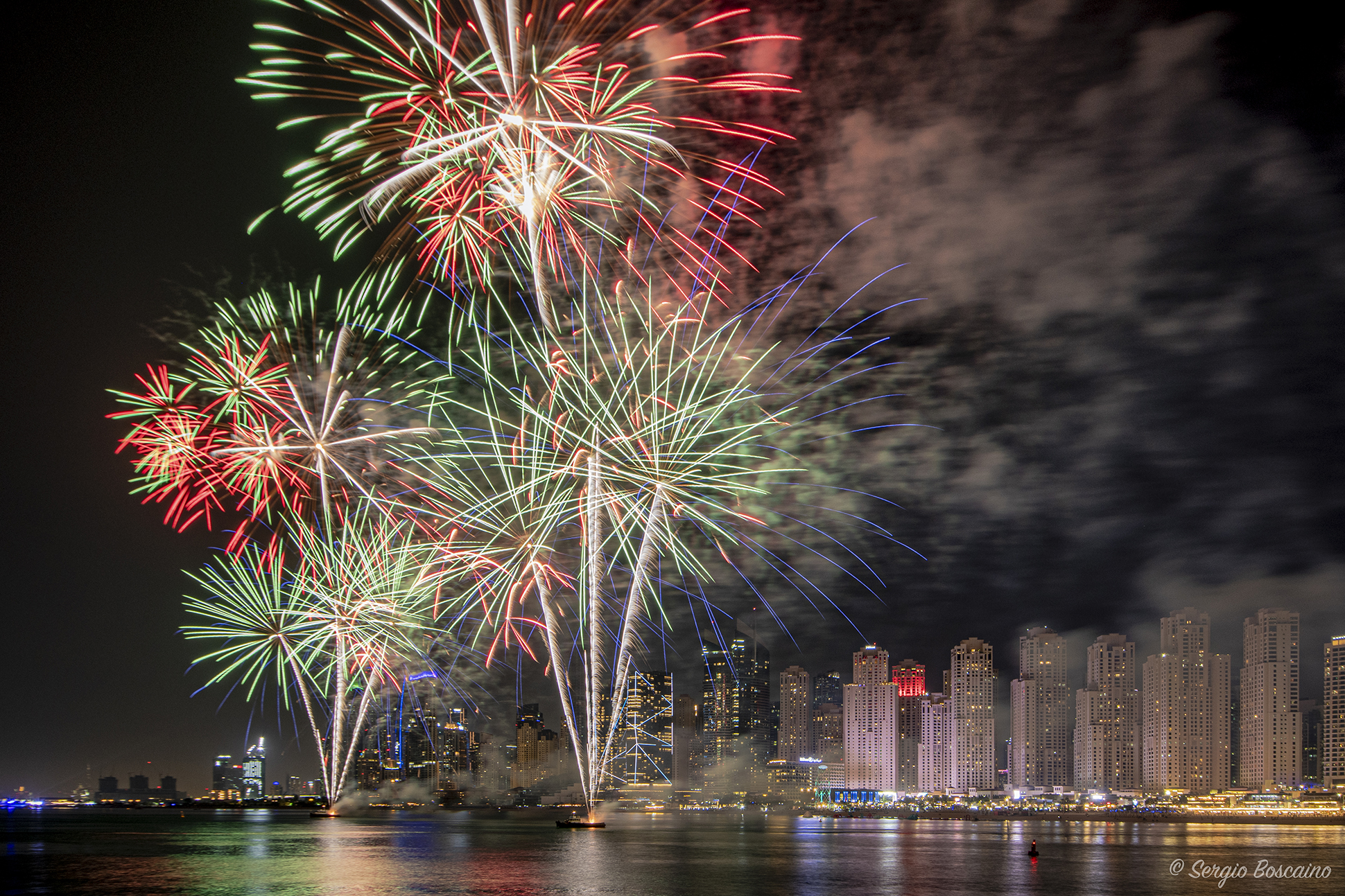
Fireworks at The Walk, 2020

This strip serves as a tourist attraction. It is located adjacent to Hilton Dubai Jumeirah and Hilton Dubai The Walk, which opened their doors in October 2000.

== See also ==
- List of shopping malls in Dubai
