= Vision Tower =

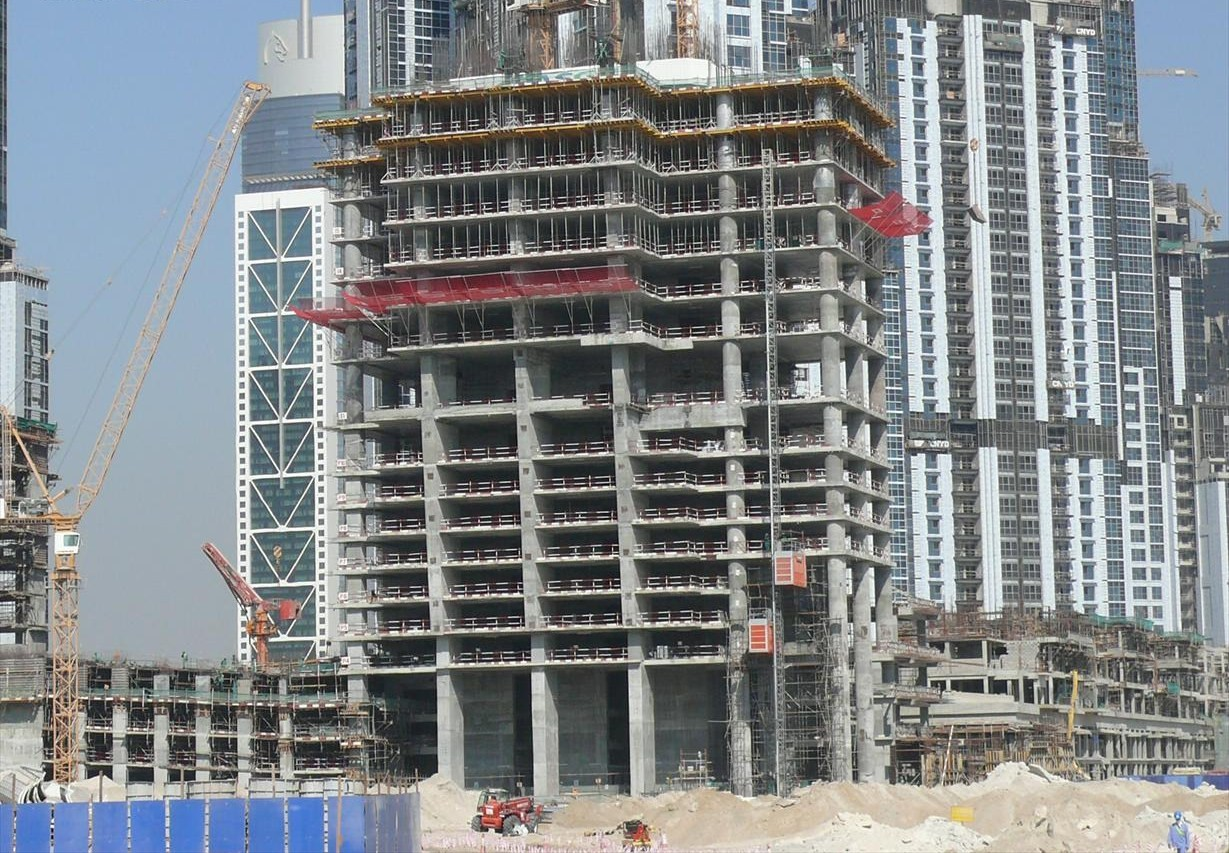
- The Vision Tower under construction in the front on 22 November 2007
- Interactive map of the Vision Tower area

General information
- Status: Completed
- Type: Office
- Location: Dubai, United Arab Emirates
- Coordinates: 25°11′17.58″N 55°15′49.97″E
- Completed: January 2011

Height
- Roof: 260 metres (850 ft)

Technical details
- Floor count: 51
- Lifts/elevators: 16

Design and construction
- Architect: tvsdesign
- Developer: Dubai Properties

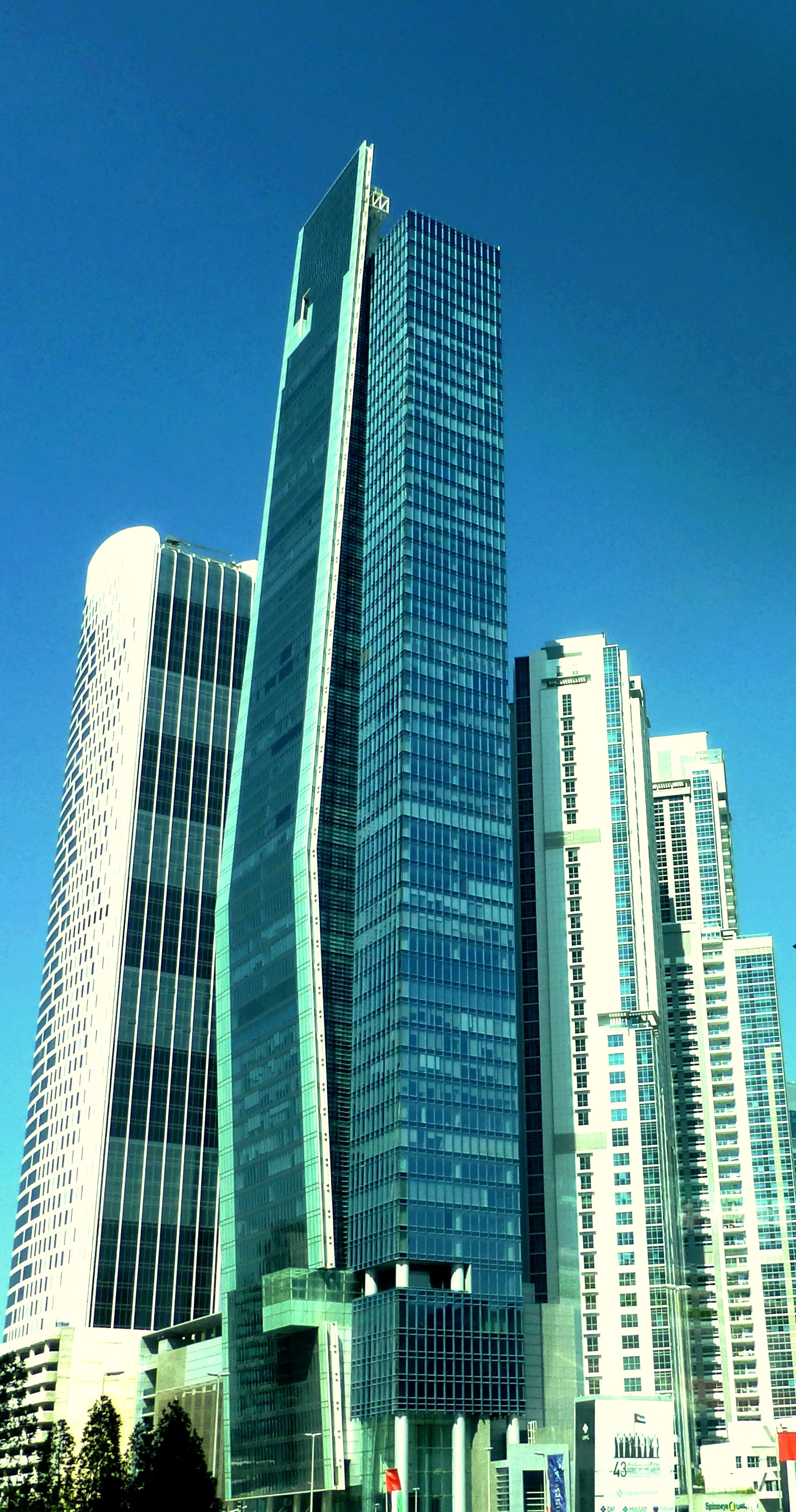
Vision Tower at Businessbay

The Vision Tower is a 60-floor tower in the Business Bay in Dubai, United Arab Emirates. The tower has a total structural height of 260 m (853 ft). Construction of the Vision Tower was completed in January 2011.

It is the only independent office building of Dubai Properties in Business Bay.

== See also ==
- List of tallest buildings in Dubai
