= Khalaf Ahmad Al Habtoor =

Emirati businessman (born 1949)

- خلف بن أحمد الحبتور
- Born: 1949 (age 76–77); Dubai, United Arab Emirates
- Citizenship: Emirati
- Occupation: Businessman
- Years active: 1970–present
- Organization: Al Habtoor Group
- Known for: Founding Chairman of Al Habtoor Group
- Title: Founding Chairman
- Website: khalafalhabtoor.net

Khalaf Ahmad Al Habtoor (born 1949) is an Emirati businessman and the founder of the Al Habtoor Group, including Al Habtoor Motors. He has also served on the Federal National Council.

== Early life and education ==
Khalaf Ahmad Al Habtoor was born in 1949 in the Al Shindagha district of Dubai. His father was a trader in the pearl and gold industries. Al Habtoor attended the Al Sha’ab School in Deira and entered the workforce at the age of 14. In the late 1960s, he was employed by the firm of Mohammed Saeed Al Mulla in Abu Dhabi.

== Al Habtoor Group ==
Khalaf Ahmad Al Habtoor founded a construction company in 1970, which later expanded into the Al Habtoor Group, a Dubai-based conglomerate. The group’s operations include hospitality, automotive distribution, real estate, and education.

Its hospitality arm manages a portfolio of hotels in partnership with international brands, including Hilton and Marriott.

In 2008, a joint venture involving the Habtoor Leighton Group was awarded a 2.9 billion dirham (US$790 million) contract to construct the Trump International Hotel and Tower on Palm Jumeirah. The project was eventually cancelled by the developer, Nakheel, following the 2008 global financial crisis.

Al Habtoor has held several public and corporate appointments, including serving as a member of the Federal National Council and as chairman of the Commercial Bank of Dubai. He was the only non-U.S. member of the United Services Organization (USO) World Board of Governors from 1994 to 1997. He served as a member of the UAE Federal National Council and as a board member of the Dubai Chamber of Commerce and Industry.

In late 2025, Al Habtoor signed a cooperation agreement with the Syrian Investment Authority to launch development projects in Syria. His stated plans include establishing a nationwide bus network of up to 3,000 vehicles and opening car showrooms in Damascus and Latakia to support local employment.

=== Al Habtoor Motors ===
Al Habtoor Motors LLC
- Type: Limited liability company
- Industry: Automotive retail and distribution
- Founded: 1983
- Headquarters: Dubai, United Arab Emirates
- Area served: United Arab Emirates, Saudi Arabia
- Key people: Ahmed Khalaf Al Habtoor (CEO)
- Products: Automobiles and automotive services
- Parent: Al Habtoor Group
- Website: habtoormotors.com

Al Habtoor Motors is an automobile distributor in the United Arab Emirates (UAE) and a division of the Al Habtoor Group. Founded in 1983 by Khalaf Ahmad Al Habtoor, the company serves as the exclusive or official distributor of several international automotive brands in the UAE.

- Mitsubishi Motors: Passenger cars, SUVs, and 4x4s
- JAC Motors: Passenger vehicles, electric cars, and SUVs
- FUSO: Commercial trucks and buses
- Bugatti: Hypercars
- Pagani: Hypercars
- Rimac: Electric hypercars
- Czinger: High-performance hypercars

Al Habtoor Motors was established in 1983, coinciding with its appointment as the exclusive distributor of Mitsubishi Motors in the UAE. The company opened its first flagship Mitsubishi showroom in Deira the following year.

In 2006, Al Habtoor Motors became an official dealer partner for Bugatti Automobiles S.A.S. in the UAE. In 2013, the company became the official distributor for JAC Motors in the UAE. That same year, Bugatti designated Al Habtoor Motors as a Service Partner of Excellence. In 2016, Al Habtoor Motors opened a Bentley showroom on Sheikh Zayed Road in Dubai, which was reported at the time to be the largest Bentley showroom in the world. A second Bentley showroom was opened in Abu Dhabi in 2020.. The same year, the company expanded its operations in Saudi Arabia by opening two FUSO sales, service and parts facilities in Riyadh after being appointed the official FUSO dealer in the country.

In 2023, Al Habtoor Motors celebrated a 40-year partnership with Mitsubishi Motors Corporation. The company also launched a renovated flagship Mitsubishi showroom in Deira. In 2025, a renovated Mitsubishi showroom was inaugurated in Musaffah, Abu Dhabi.

== Philanthropy ==
In 2013, Al Habtoor established the Khalaf Ahmad Al Habtoor Foundation, a charitable organization funded by a 20% equity stake in the Al Habtoor Group. The foundation's mandate covers humanitarian aid in the UAE and internationally. Notable projects include the funding of the Khalaf Al Habtoor Hospital in Akkar, Lebanon, and a 2024 housing initiative for Emirati youth valued at AED 270 million.

Following severe flooding in the United Arab Emirates in April 2024, Al Habtoor allocated AED 17 million to repair damaged homes and provided temporary hotel accommodation for displaced families. In 2024, he also proposed the creation of a national fund for UAE mothers, pledging up to AED 100 million in matching funds if established.

== Public commentary ==
Al Habtoor has occasionally commented on international political issues. During the 2016 United States presidential election, he initially expressed support for Donald Trump but later withdrew his support after Trump proposed a ban on Muslims entering the United States.

In 2026, Al Habtoor criticized U.S. military actions against Iran, stating that such actions could increase security risks for countries in the Gulf region.

== Personal life ==
Al Habtoor married his cousin, Hamda Al Suwaidi, in the mid-1960s; the couple has six children. His sons include Rashid, Mohammed, and Ahmad, and his daughters are Noora, Amna, and Meera. A long-time tennis player, Al Habtoor founded the Al Habtoor Tennis Challenge in 1998, an annual ITF Women's World Tennis Tour event held in Dubai.

== Recognition ==
According to Forbes, Al Habtoor was ranked 335th among the world’s wealthiest individuals, with an estimated net worth of about US$2.3 billion.

In 2021, the Al Habtoor Group was ranked 46th on the “Top 100 Arab Family Businesses” list published by Forbes Middle East.

In 2022, Al Habtoor was included in Forbes Middle East’s “Top 50 Travel and Tourism Leaders” list.
