= Remraam =

Human settlement in United Arab Emirates

Coordinates: 25.0012511°N 55.2479245°E

Remraam is a residential community in Dubai, UAE. Located in Al Hebiah 5. The Remraam development is located next to Emirates Road E611 and Hessa Street (D61). Plans for the development included 198 buildings and make it one of the largest construction site in the UAE but this was later scaled down. The community is divided in two parts, Al Thammam and Al Ramth. The buildings in the community are grouped by two, with a covered car parking in between. Facilities include a small community malls with supermarkets, four outdoor swimming pools, a nursery and a school, community gym, and football, tennis and basketball courts.
