= Bay Central =

- Interactive map of the Bay Central area

General information
- Type: Residential and hotel
- Location: Dubai, United Arab Emirates
- Coordinates: 25°04′43″N 55°08′16″E
- Completed: December, 2012

Technical details
- Floor count: Tower 1 - 42; Tower 2 - 50; Tower 3 - 42

Design and construction
- Developer: Select Group

Website
- https://www.select-group.ae/select-group-overview

Bay Central is a waterfront complex of three mixed-use towers - the Central Tower, the Intercontinental Tower, and the West Tower - in Dubai Marina in Dubai, United Arab Emirates. The West Tower, and the Intercontinental Tower have 42 floors each. The Central Tower has 50 floors (180 metres). Construction was completed in December 2012. The Intercontinental Tower houses the Intercontinental Dubai Marina Hotel, while the West Tower and Central Tower contains 747 residential units.

== See also ==
- List of tallest buildings in Dubai
