= Hotel Riu Plaza Guadalajara =

Hotel in Guadalajara, Jalisco, Mexico

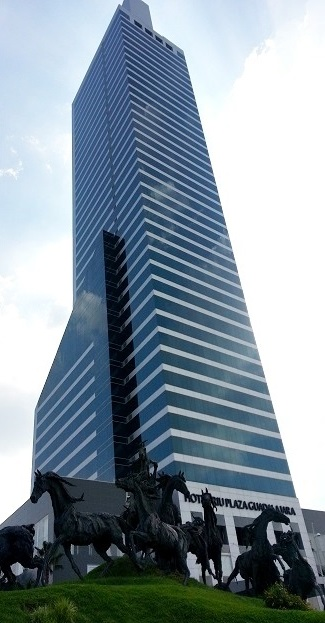
- Interactive map of the Hotel Riu Plaza Guadalajara area

General information
- Status: Completed
- Type: Hotel
- Location: Guadalajara, Jalisco, Mexico
- Coordinates: 20°39′55.97″N 103°23′37.44″W
- Construction started: March 2009
- Completed: 2011
- Opening: June 2011
- Cost: US$ 110 million

Height
- Antenna spire: 204 metres (669 ft)
- Roof: 189.2 metres (621 ft)

Technical details
- Floor count: 42
- Floor area: 8,190 square metres (88,200 sq ft)

Design and construction
- Structural engineer: Ingeniería Básica Diseño Estructural S.A. de C.V.
- Main contractor: Montecarlo Construcción y Mobiliario S.A. de C.V.

Hotel Riu Plaza Guadalajara is a skyscraper hotel located in the city of Guadalajara, Jalisco, Mexico. At 204-metre tall (669 ft), it is the city and metropolitan area's tallest building and the twelfth highest in Mexico to date.

Construction began in March 2009, although there were no signs of the construction starting officially until September or October of the same year, and opened in June 2011. It has 42 habitable floors, holding 550 rooms, in addition to restaurants, meeting rooms and a 44th floor penthouse. On the roof is a heliport and maintenance rooms. A pinnacle rises above the top floor by adding 16 metres (52 ft) to the building height.

== Construction history ==
Its construction involved deep excavation, producing three basement floors and the foundation. Around the excavation was a retaining wall. This wall was made with steel and shotcrete. For its part the foundation account employed 113 piles of 0.6 to 2 metres (2 ft 0 in to 6 ft 7 in) in diameter buried at a depth of between 10 and 15 metres (33 and 49 ft).

The area where this building stands is 8,190.99 square metres (88,167.1 sq ft). The main materials were concrete, steel and glass. Its structure has columns and floor made from reinforced concrete and steel facade is formed of glass.

The Hotel is the second hotel in the chain built in a city, while others are beach resorts. The first of these was built in Panama.

=== Structural design ===
The building uses a reinforced-concrete and steel structural system, while its façade is primarily made of glass. Ingeniería Básica Diseño Estructural served as the structural engineer, while the Council on Vertical Urbanism classifies the tower's structural material as all-concrete.

=== 2011 fire incident ===
On 16 February 2011, a fire occurred on the first and second floors while the hotel was under construction. Several fire department units responded, and the blaze was brought under control after about two hours.

Authorities said the fire appeared to have originated in an explosion involving a polyurethane duct.

== Characteristics and historical data ==
The hotel opened on 17 June 2011 as RIU's first urban hotel in Mexico and the second property in the Riu Plaza line worldwide, after the Riu Plaza Panama. The building has 42 floors and more than 550 rooms, and was the tallest in Guadalajara and its metropolitan area at the time of its opening.

During the 2011 Pan American Games in Guadalajara, the hotel hosted competition judges and several athletes. In May 2020, after RIU temporarily closed its hotels during the COVID-19 pandemic, the Riu Plaza Guadalajara was among the first two RIU properties worldwide to reopen, and the first in Latin America to implement the company's post-COVID operational protocols.

== Rooftop Bar ==
In March of the year 2025, the hotel opened the 360° Rooftop Bar on the 41st floor, the highest rooftop bar in Guadalajara, with panoramic views of the city.

== See also ==
- List of tallest buildings in Mexico
