= Wissam =

Wissam (Arabic: وسام) is a masculine given name of Arabic origin. Notable people with this name include:

== Given name ==
- Wissam Ben Bahri, paralympic athlete from Tunisia competing mainly in category F20 long jumpand high jump events
- Wissam El Bekri (born 1984), French-Tunisian football defender
- Wissam Constantin (born 1986), the first deaf person to graduate from a university in Lebanon and the Middle East
- Wissam Damaa, Lebanese businessman
- Wissam Gassid (born 1981), Iraqi goalkeeper
- Wissam S. al-Hashimi (1942–2005), Iraqi geologist born in Baghdad
- Wissam al-Hassan (1965–2012), brigadier general at the Lebanese Internal Security Forces, head of its intelligence-oriented information branch
- Wissam Hosni (born 1985), Tunisian long-distance runner
- Wissam Joubran (born 1983), composer, oud (an Arabic lute) virtuoso, and master lute maker
- Wissam Kadhim (born 1986), Iraqi football (soccer) midfielder
- Wissam Kilo, (born 1984), known as Wiz Kilo, Canadian hip hop and R&B artist, songwriter, dancer, actor and hip hop instructor
- Wissam Tarif (born 1975), played a key role in the field of pro-Democracy and Human Rights work in Syria and Lebanon
- Wissam al-Tawil (born 1970) a senior commander of Hezbollah's Radwan Force
- Wissam Ben Yedder (born 1990), French footballer
- Wissam al-Zahawie, former official in Saddam Hussein Iraq government, Iraq's non-resident Ambassador to the Holy See, Iraq's Ambassador to the United Nations
- Wissam Zaki (born 1986), Duhok FC player and Iraq

== See also ==
- Assassination of Wissam al-Hassan, October 2012 Beirut bombing
- Wissam al-Arch or Order of the Throne (Arabic: Wissam al-Arch, French: Ordre du Trône), a state decoration of the Kingdom of Morocco
- Wissam al-Mohammadi or Order of Muhammad, also named Order of Sovereignty, the highest state decoration of the Kingdom of Morocco
- ISAM
- WISA
- WSSM (disambiguation)
