= Almas Tower =

Skyscraper in Dubai, United Arab Emirates

- برج الماس
- Almas Tower in November 2014
- Interactive map of the Almas Tower area
- Alternative names: Diamond Tower

Record height
- Tallest in Dubai from 2008 to 2009^{[I]}
- Preceded by: Emirates Office Tower
- Surpassed by: Burj Khalifa

General information
- Status: Completed
- Type: Commercial offices
- Architectural style: Modernism
- Location: Jumeirah Lake Towers; Al Thanyah Fifth, Dubai, United Arab Emirates
- Coordinates: 25.0689°N 55.1412°E
- Groundbreaking: 16 July 2005
- Construction started: 29 March 2006
- Completed: 15 November 2008
- Opening: 12 January 2009
- Cost: AED3.6 billion
- Owner: Dubai Multi Commodities Centre

Height
- Antenna spire: 360 m (1,180 ft)
- Roof: 306.36 m (1,005.1 ft)
- Top floor: 279.3 m (916 ft)

Technical details
- Floor count: 68; 5 below ground
- Floor area: 160,000 m^{2} (1,700,000 sq ft)
- Lifts/elevators: 35

Design and construction
- Architect: Atkins Middle East
- Developer: Dubai Multi Commodities Centre
- Structural engineer: Atkins Middle East
- Main contractor: Taisei Corporation

Almas Tower (Arabic: برج الماس Diamond Tower) is a 68-storey, 360 m (1,180 ft), supertall skyscraper in the Jumeirah Lakes Towers, Dubai, United Arab Emirates. Construction of the office building began in early 2005 and was completed in 2008 with the installation of some remaining cladding panels at the top of the tower. The building was topped out in 2008, and became the tallest building in Dubai until 2009 when it was surpassed by Burj Khalifa.

== Construction ==
Almas Tower is located on its own artificial island in the centre of the Jumeirah Lake Towers Free Zone scheme, the tallest of all the buildings on the development. It was designed by Atkins Middle East, who designed most of the JLT Free Zone complex. The tower was constructed by the Taisei Corporation of Japan in a joint venture with Arabian Construction Co. (ACC) who were awarded the contract by Nakheel Properties on 16 July 2005.

== Building Usage ==
The Dubai Multi Commodities Centre (DMCC), the developer of the tower, was the first to move in. The DMCC moved its corporate offices along with the Dubai Diamond Exchange, to the unfinished tower on 15 November 2008. Almas Tower now houses facilities that provide a wide range of services for the region’s diamond, coloured gemstones and pearl industries. Along with the Dubai Diamond Exchange, these include the Dubai Gems Club, the Dubai Pearl Exchange, the Kimberley Process Certification offices and access to secure transportation agencies such as Brinks and Transguard, in addition to networking and meeting rooms. Diamond cutting and exchange take place at the tower. Due to the type of transactions taking place at the tower, high security is installed. Almas Tower ranked 8th in the 2009 Emporis Skyscraper Awards.

== Incidents ==
On 22 April 2018, a fire broke out in Almas Tower and all residents were evacuated. No injuries were reported according to the Dubai Civil Defence.

== See also ==
- Dubai Marina
- Jumeirah Lake Towers
- Burj Khalifa
- List of tallest buildings in Dubai
- List of tallest buildings in the United Arab Emirates
- List of tallest buildings

=== Similar structures ===
- Q1 Tower, tower in Australia
- The Landmark (Abu Dhabi), tower in the UAE
- World Trade Center Abu Dhabi, tower in the UAE

Records
Preceded by Emirates Office Tower; 354.6 m (1,163 ft)	Tallest building in Dubai; 2009	Succeeded by Burj Khalifa (current)
