= Dubai Multi Commodities Centre =

Free-trade zone in Dubai

Dubai Multi Commodities Centre مركز دبي للسلع المتعددة
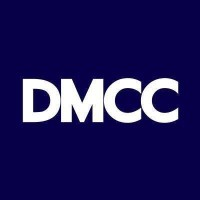
- Type: Free-trade zone and Government agency (former)
- Industry: Commodities exchange Real estate
- Founded: 2002
- Headquarters: Almas Tower, JLT, Dubai, United Arab Emirates
- Key people: Ahmed Sultan Bin Sulayem, Executive Chairman & Chief Executive Officer
- Number of employees: 300+
- Website: www.dmcc.ae

The Dubai Multi Commodities Centre (DMCC) is a commodities exchange and free-trade zone in the United Arab Emirates. It is located in the Jumeirah Lake Towers district of Dubai. The DMCC was created in 2002 and deals in four main sectors: precious commodities (e.g., gold, diamonds); energy; steel and metals and agricultural commodities (e.g., tea, cotton).

In August 2020, the Investment Corporation of Dubai, a sovereign wealth fund, became the parent company of the autonomous DMCC as part of a major restructuring.

== History ==
On 1 May 2002, Crown Prince Mohammed bin Rashid Al Maktoum issued a royal decree to establish the Dubai Multi Commodities Centre (DMCC) as a center for commodities trading. Further regulations were issued through decrees that clarified the DMCC's status as an independent authority and exempted companies operating in the free-trade zone from taxes, customs duties and regulations of the Dubai Municipality.

Further regulation were issued on 22 March 2003, that clarified the president of the DMCC must be appointed by the Ruler of Dubai and could then appoint a Chief Executive Officer and members of the Board of Directors. The law expanded the mandate of the free-trade zone to establish any other agencies or companies it might need to run the free-trade zone and support companies operating there, including recruitment of personnel, and obtaining financial loans and assistance from banks.

The Dubai Diamond Exchange (DDE) was established in 2004 to facilitate the development of the diamond and coloured gems market. Dubai ranks third behind Antwerp and Mumbai in the leading global diamond hubs in terms of trade, growing from $300 million (Dh1.10 billion) in trade in 2002 to $26 billion in 2016. The Dubai Pearl Exchange (DPE) provides facilities for traders in pearls and holds events like the World Pearl Forum. In early 2011, DPE held the first pearl auctions outside of the Far East.

In 2012, the DMCC launched its own financial products, such as the Dubai Commodity Asset Management (DCAM), Dubai Shariah Asset Management (DSAM), DMCC Tradeflow, and Dubai Gold & Commodities Exchange (DGCX).

In 2018, the DMCC launched the Middle East's first Google for Entrepreneurs Global Tech Hub with AstroLabs Dubai.

In 2020, the DMCC underwent major restructuring. While previously acting as both a free zone and its own authority, the structure of the entity was changed, with the DMCC and DMCC Authority split into separate entities and the DMCC as a center was transferred to the control of the Investment Corporation of Dubai, and the DMCC Authority was transferred under the control of the Dubai Executive Council as a full Dubai government department.

== Overview ==
DMCC Free Zone is the largest free-trade zone in the UAE, with more than 21,000 registered members as of 2022. In 2022, DMCC was named number one global free zone for an eighth consecutive year by the Financial Times fDi Intelligence magazine.

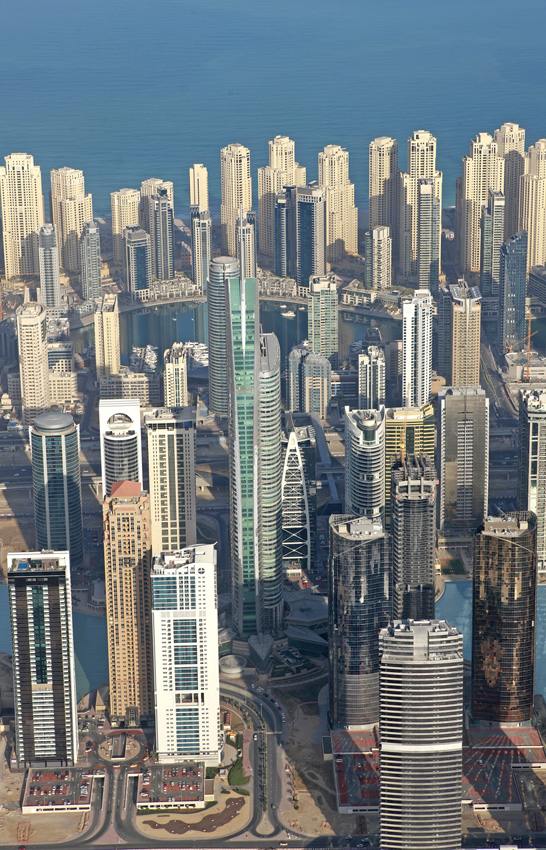
Aerial View of Jumeirah Lake Towers (JLT)

DMCC supports commodity trading through organizations such as the Dubai Diamond Exchange (DDE), the Dubai Pearl Exchanges (DPE), DMCC Tradeflow, the Dubai Good Delivery Standard (DGD) for Gold, the DMCC Tea Centre, and the DMCC Coffee Centre.

=== Crypto currency ===
DMCC has issued first сrypto assets trading license for making over-the-counter transactions with cryptocurrencies on 26 May 2021 in order to develop the crypto industry in the United Arab Emirates. Until the moment trading operations with crypto currency were illegal in the UAE.

== DMCC Authority ==
The DMCC Authority is the Government of Dubai regulatory body for the DMCC. The DMCC Authority is headed by a Chief Executive and a Board of Directors. The Ruler of Dubai appoints the Board of Directors, and the Chief Executive is appointed by the Dubai Executive Council.

== Awards ==
- fDi Global Free Zones of the Year, 2015, 2016, 2017, 2018 and 2019, 2020, 2021 and 2022.
- Global Islamic Finance Award for Best Supporting Institution, 2014.
- Facilitating Most Innovative Structured Transaction Award in 2007, Deal of the Year Award.
- Dubai Shariah Asset Management awarded as Best Shariah Compliant product provider, and DSAM Kauthar Commodity Fund received Best Funds of Funds Award, at the Hedge Funds World Middle East Conference 2010.
- Best Fund-of-Funds, Failaka Islamic Fund Award, April 21, 2010.

== Property ==
DMCC, for which Jumeirah Lakes Towers (JLT) (Arabic: أبراج بحيرات جميرا) is the physical address, is a 200-hectare mixed-use free zone is grouped into clusters each comprising three tower blocks around three large lakes and a central park. There are 68 towers and the 200-hectare development currently comprises approximately 180,000 sq/m of commercial, residential and retail space.

Almas Tower, the headquarters of DMCC, was completed in mid-2008, is the world's 31st tallest structure. The 68-floor building houses around a thousand diamond companies, diamond vaults, a diamond trading floor, and the Almas Conference Centre (ACC). DMCC's 2017 plan for the Uptown Dubai district includes more than 10 million square feet of commercial and residential space, more than 200 retail and F&B outlets, alongside 3000 residences, a central entertainment plaza and luxury hotels.

=== List of JLT Towers ===
Cluster	Tower 1	Tower 2	Tower 3
A	A1 - New Dubai Gate 2	A2 - Laguna Tower	A3 - Lake Side Residence
B	B1 - Wind Tower II	B2 - Lake View Tower	B3 - Wind Tower I
C	C1 - Fortune Tower	C2 - Gold Crest Executive Tower	C3 - The Palladium
D	D1 - Indigo Tower	D2 - Lake Terrace Tower	D3 - Lake City Tower
E	E1 - Global Lake View	E2 - Al Sheraa Tower	E3 - SABA Office
F	F1 - Bobyan Tower	F2 - HDS Tower	F3 - Indigo Icon
G	G1 - Dubai Arch	G2 - Jumeirah Business Centre 1	G3 - Wisal
H	H1 - Jumeirah Business Centre 7	H2 - Concorde Tower	H3 - Al Fajer Properties (likely JBC 8 or 9)
I	I1 - Silver Tower	I2 - Platinum Tower	I3 - Gold Tower
J	J1 - Gold Crest Views 2	J2 - Unknown Tower	J3 - Bonnington Tower
K	K1 - Under Construction	K2 - MBL Residence	K3 - Under Construction
L	L1 - ME DO RE	L2 - Dubai Star	L3 - Ikon Towers
M	M1 - HDS Business Centre	M2 -	M3 - Ikon Towers
N	N1 - The Dome	N2 - Lakepoint	N3 - Jumeirah Business Centre 4
O	O1 - Reef Tower	O2 - O2 Residence	O3 - Madina Tower
P	P1 - Armada Towers 1	P2 - Armada Towers 2	P3 - Armada Towers 3
Q	Q1 - SABA Twin Towers	Q2 - New Dubai Gate 1	Q3 - SABA Twin Towers
R	R1 - Al Waleed Paradise	R2 - MAG 214	R3 - Al Saqran Tower
S	S1 - Green Lake Towers	S2 - Green Lake Towers	S3 - Green Lake Towers
T	T1 - Fortune Executive	T2 - Lake Plaza	T3 - Pullman Hotel Dubai, JLT
U	B1 - U1 - Al Seef Tower 3	U2 - Al Seef Tower 2	U3 - Tamweel Tower
V	V1 - Jumeirah Business Centre 2	V2 - Gold Crest	V3 - V3 Tower
W	W1 - Jumeirah Business Centre 5	W2 - Tiffany Tower	W3 - LIWA Heights
X	X1 - Jumeirah Bay	X2 - Jumeirah Bay	X3 - Jumeirah Bay
Y	Y1 - Jumeirah Business Centre 3	Y2 - Lake Shore Tower	Y3 - Swiss Tower
Z	Z1 - Jumeirah Lake Apartments	Z2 - Anantara Hotel & Spa	Z3 - Jumeirah Lake Offices
AA	AA1 - Business Avenue	AA2 - Amesco Tower	AA3 - Corporate Tower
BB	BB1 - Business Avenue	BB2 - Business Avenue	BB3 - SABA TOWER 4

== See also ==
- Dubai
- Jumeirah Lake Towers
- JLT Free Zone
- Almas Tower
- Armada Towers
- Dubai Ports World
- Dubai Marina
- List of free Trade Zones in Dubai
