= Al Seef Towers =

Cluster of 3 towers in Dubai

Tamweel Tower
- Interactive map of the Tamweel Tower area

General information
- Type: Residential
- Location: Dubai, United Arab Emirates
- Coordinates: 25°4′47.17″N 55°9′11.85″E
- Completed: 2008

Design and construction
- Architect: DAR Consult
- Developer: Nakheel Properties

The Al Seef Towers is a cluster of three residential buildings in the Jumeirah Lake Towers in Dubai, United Arab Emirates. The complex has two towers that are 35 floors and one tower that is 40 floors. Construction of the Al Seef Towers was completed in 2008.

== Towers ==
The complex consists of 3 buildings:

Rank	Name	Height* metres / ft	Floors	Notes
1	Al Seef Tower 2	179	40	
2	Al Seef Tower 3	160	35	
2	Tamweel Tower	160 / 525	35	

== Fire 2012 ==
At 1:30 am on 18 November 2012 a fire broke out at Tamweel Tower, which forced the temporary evacuation of the building. The fire was later proven to have been started by a cigarette butt, discarded by a careless smoker. In the aftermath of the fire, the building became uninhabitable and needed reconstruction. In January 2014, Emirates 24|7 reported that the work at the building had not been started due to legal disagreement between Tamweel (the developer) and the building's Owner Association (OA) on who would sign the restoration contract. By November that year, the pledged cost had reached Dh78 million. However the work was still not started at that time. On 17 December 2015, the Arabian Business reported that repair work on the tower had already begun in October that year. The building was then restored in June 2016. Residents were finally allowed to return to Tamweel Tower on 7 September 2017.

== See also ==
- List of tallest buildings in Dubai
