= AstroLabs =

Digital capability building company

AstroLabs DMCC
- Founded: 2013
- Founder: Louis Lebbos, Muhammed Mekki
- Area served: United Arab Emirates, Saudi Arabia
- Key people: Roland Daher (CEO), Joe Kobrianos (CSO)
- Website: astrolabs.com

AstroLabs is a Dubai-based business setup consultant with offices in Riyadh and Dubai. They specialize in company formation and incorporation, licensing, business services, corporate services and ecosystem integration for international firms entering the Saudi Arabian and United Arab Emirates (UAE) markets. Their vision is to be the operations as a service provider where they run your local operations while their clients focus on growth. It started as a Google for Startups (GFS) co-working space member of the GFS Tech Hub Network, as of 2024, it is no longer with the program.

== Overview ==
AstroLabs was founded in 2014 by Louis Lebbos & Muhammed Mekki, co-founders of Namshi.com. Now as board members. With the company being led by Roland Daher as CEO and Joe Kobrianos as CSO The company launched in March 2013.

It operates from Riyadh and Dubai and the co-working and private offices spaces are in Jumeirah Lakes Towers and Riyadh.

== Company name ==
The company's name is based upon the astrolabe, a tool for navigation that was used by mariners in the Middle Ages.

== Activities and role in the startup ecosystem ==
AstroLabs has developed its activities around supporting technology companies, entrepreneurs and international businesses entering the Middle Eastern market. The company provides business support services, coworking facilities, training programmes and access to professional networks. These services help companies understand the business environment in the United Arab Emirates and Saudi Arabia and support them in establishing and developing their operations.

One of AstroLabs' early initiatives was the creation of a technology hub in Dubai in cooperation with Google for Entrepreneurs and the Dubai Multi Commodities Centre (DMCC). The hub was designed to provide entrepreneurs with access to shared office spaces, mentoring, training and networking opportunities. It also created an environment in which startup founders could exchange knowledge, develop business ideas and establish professional connections. In 2016, Knowledge at Wharton, a publication of the University of Pennsylvania's Wharton School, described AstroLabs as a startup hub and training initiative supporting entrepreneurs in the Middle East.

The company's presence in Dubai expanded in 2018, when it opened a second coworking location in Jumeirah Lakes Towers. This expansion increased the amount of workspace available to startups and established businesses. The new location offered office facilities and meeting spaces for companies operating in technology and other business sectors. The expansion was part of AstroLabs' efforts to support the growing demand for professional workspaces and services among companies entering the UAE market.

AstroLabs has also participated in initiatives focused on developing digital skills and supporting e-commerce. These activities are connected to the increasing importance of online retail, digital marketing and technology-based business operations. In April 2022, Dubai CommerCity announced the launch of an e-commerce academy in partnership with AstroLabs. The initiative aimed to provide training and knowledge to individuals and businesses interested in the e-commerce sector. It formed part of wider efforts to strengthen digital business capabilities in the United Arab Emirates.

In addition to its activities in the UAE, AstroLabs supports international companies seeking to establish operations in Saudi Arabia. Entering a new market can involve various challenges, including company registration, licensing, recruitment and understanding local regulations. Business support organisations can help companies manage these processes and develop relationships with local partners. AstroLabs' presence in both Dubai and Riyadh reflects its involvement in two important business centres in the Gulf region.

AstroLabs is part of the wider startup ecosystem, which includes entrepreneurs, investors, business incubators, accelerators, universities and government institutions. These organisations contribute to the development of new businesses by providing infrastructure, professional advice, training and opportunities for cooperation. Their role is particularly important for technology startups, which often require specialised knowledge and access to business networks when entering new markets. A report by Dubai Chambers examining the UAE's entrepreneurial landscape provides further context on the organisations and conditions supporting the country's startup ecosystem.

The company's activities therefore extend beyond providing office space. By combining business establishment services, entrepreneurship support and digital skills development, AstroLabs contributes to the development of technology-based businesses and the digital economy in the Middle East.
