= Wissam Damaa =

Lebanese businessman

- Born: Lebanon
- Occupation: Businessman
- Known for: Palace Group
- Title: Chairman of Palace Group
- Website: palacegroup.ae

Wissam Damaa is a Lebanese businessman and real estate developer based in Dubai, United Arab Emirates. He is the founder and chairman of Palace Group, a real estate development firm. Damaa is known for developing residential projects on Jumeirah Bay Island and other parts of the Dubai area.

== Career ==
Damaa was born in Lebanon. He began his career in the construction and architecture sectors and later specialized in luxury development.

In 2024, Damaa announced "The Cliffs," a $1.1 billion luxury residential project located along the Dubai Canal. The project is a joint venture between Palace Group and Abu Ghazaleh Investments (AGI). The development's architecture was designed by the New York-based firm Kohn Pedersen Fox (KPF).

Damaa has helped developed Jumeirah Bay Island. His firm developed "The Bay Mansions," which consists of beachfront estates, with individual properties valued at over $100 million USD. In 2024, Portuguese professional footballer Cristiano Ronaldo purchased a mansion at Jumeirah Bay which was partly developed by Damaa's firm.

Damaa launched "Aya" in Jumeirah Garden City, a luxury development project.

Damaa is involved in events such as the Naked Heart Foundation Gala, as well as various other events.
