= Dubai Marina Mall =

- Location: Dubai, United Arab Emirates
- Coordinates: 25.076564°N 55.140402°E
- Address: Sheikh Zayed Rd - إمارة دبيّ -
- Opened: 2000; 26 years ago
- Architect: Emaar Properties PJSC
- Num. of stores: 140
- Floor area: 390,000 sq ft (36,000 m^{2})
- Floors: 4
- Public transit: DAMAC Properties (Dubai Metro)
- Website: dubaimarinamall.com

Dubai Marina Mall is an indoor shopping mall in Dubai, UAE. It is named for its close proximity to Dubai Marina. The large shopping facility has four levels and 390,000 square feet (36,000 m^{2}). There are 140 stores, 21 dining options and a Children's play area. It is one of the main shopping malls in Dubai.

== History ==
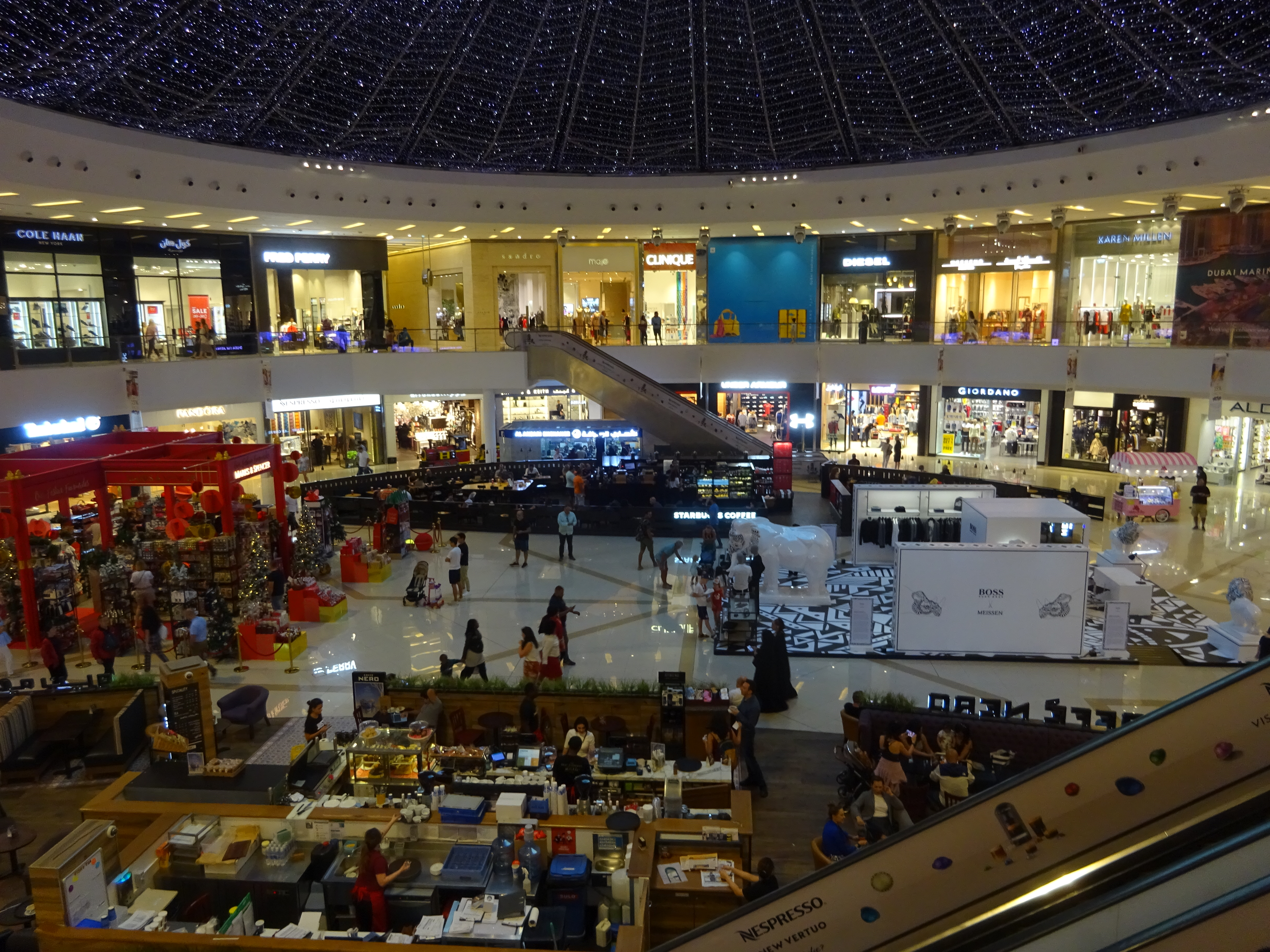
Interior view in the mall

The mall is part of the Dubai Marina project which has been open since October 17, 2000. The mall is linked to the 5-star JW Marriott Hotel Marina. It has become a tourist attraction. The entire Dubai Marina development accommodates more than 120,000 people in residential towers and villas.

== Family friendly events ==
The mall regularly hosts child friendly events, like dancing with SpongeBob SquarePants, and Dubai Marina Mall's Indoor Beach Party where children enjoy carnival games, arts, and other games.

The Dome Atrium in Dubai Marina Mall is staged for different family friendly events: in August 2019 the dome was set up for a Play-Doh event where children gathered to experiment.

Dubai Marina Mall

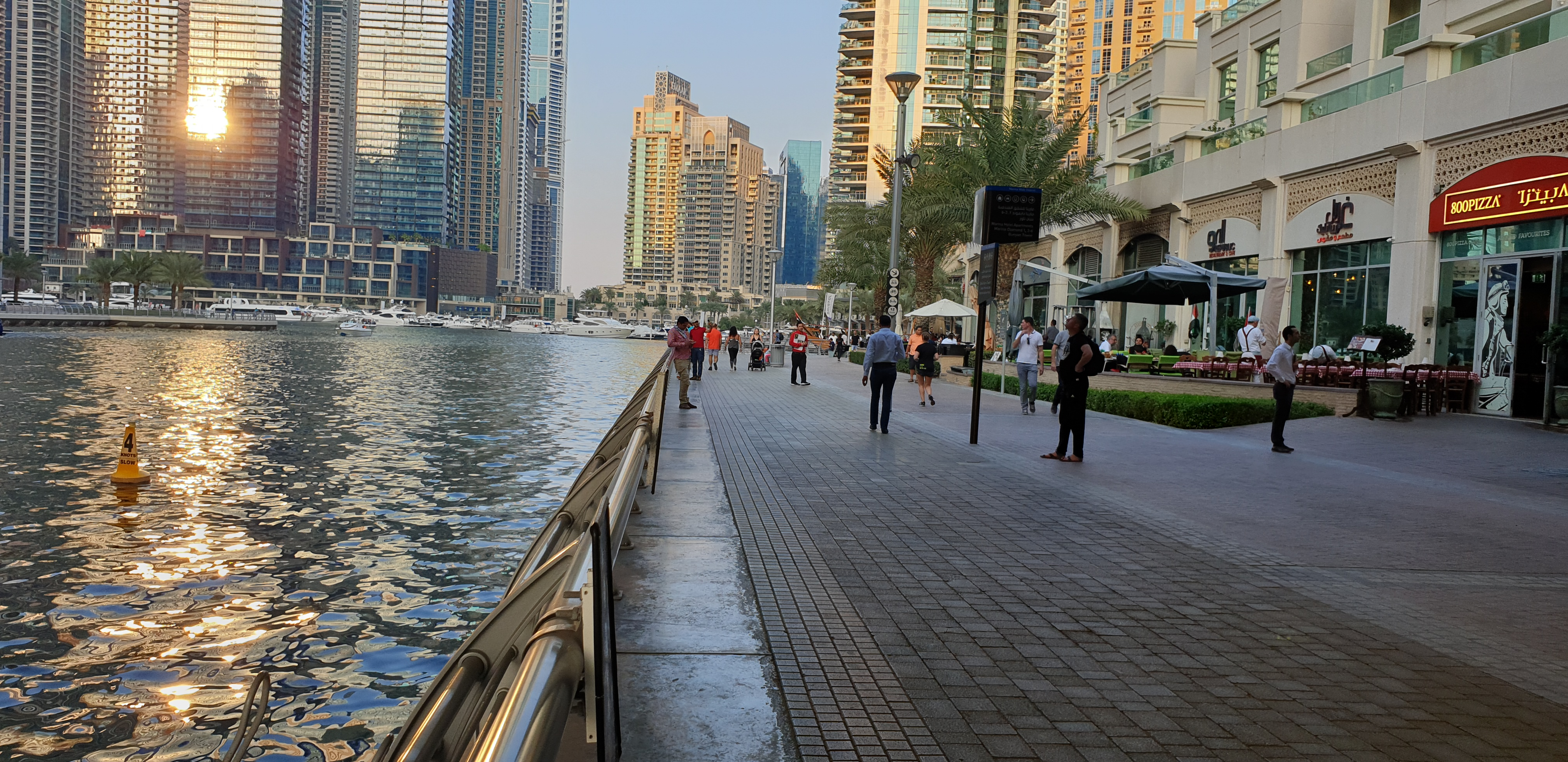
Dubai Marina near Marina mall

There are many events happening on the marina walk side in front of the mall, along with several kiosks that open during the winter season. During the month of December the mall is decorated with snow-related decor and child-friendly activities.

== See also ==
- Developments in Dubai
- Tourism in Dubai
- The Dubai Mall
- Mall of the Emirates
