= Concorde Tower =

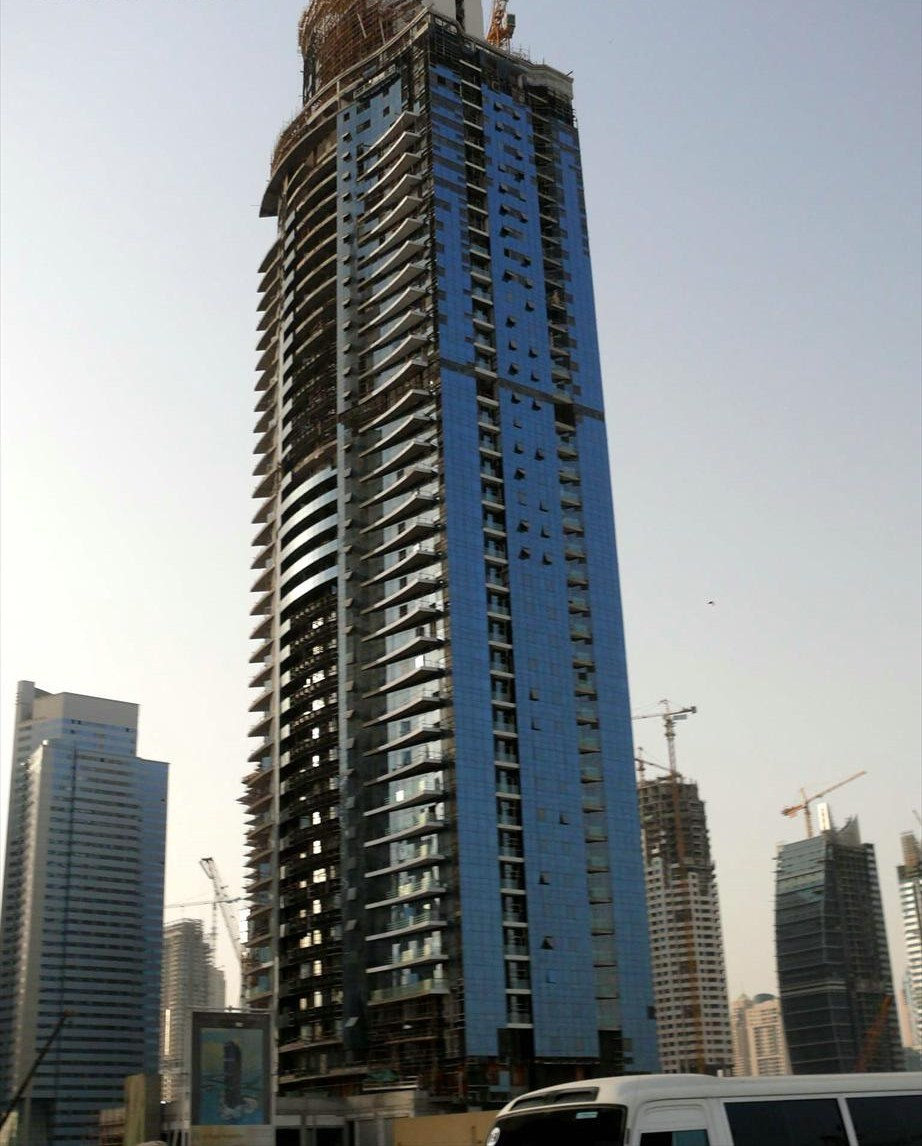
- Concorde Tower under construction on 15 May 2008
- Interactive map of the Concorde Tower area

General information
- Status: Completed in April 2009
- Type: Residential
- Location: Jumeirah Lake Towers, Dubai, United Arab Emirates
- Coordinates: 25°4′11.02″N 55°8′40.37″E
- Construction started: 2003
- Opening: 2009

Height
- Roof: 190 m (620 ft)

Technical details
- Floor count: 45
- Floor area: 50,000 m^{2} (540,000 sq ft)

Design and construction
- Architects: Arif & Bintoak
- Developer: 32Group

The Concorde Tower is a 45-floor tower in the Jumeirah Lake Towers Free Zone in Dubai, United Arab Emirates. The residential tower, which is estimated to cost US$120 million to construct, has a total structural height of 190 m (623 ft). The developer said the building was to be completed in December 2007. Due to the force majeure situations, building got completed in February 2009, and ready for use in April 2009.

== See also ==
- List of tallest buildings in Dubai
