= Armada Towers =

- أبراج أرمادا
- Armada Towers in 2024

General information
- Type: Mixed Use, Commercial, Residential
- Architectural style: Modernism
- Location: Dubai, United Arab Emirates
- Coordinates: 25°04′31.20″N 55°08′41.33″E
- Construction started: 2004
- Completed: 2009
- Opening: 2010

Technical details
- Floor count: Tower 1 – 36; Tower 2 – 40; Tower 3 – 36
- Floor area: 2.5 Million square feet
- Lifts/elevators: 18

Design and construction
- Architect: Adnan Saffarini
- Developer: Mohammed Rahif Hakmi

Armada Towers (Arabic: أبراج أرمادا) is a complex of three skyscrapers in Jumeirah Lake Towers (JLT) Dubai Multi Commodities Centre Free Zone being built opposite to the Dubai Marina and next to the Emirates Golf Club in Dubai, United Arab Emirates. It is a mixed-use development that contains residential and commercial units.

== General ==
Armada Towers is one of Armada Group projects in the UAE. The construction contract was awarded to CSHK and the total cost of the project estimated to be over AED 1 Billion (US$300 Million). The construction began in early 2005 and was completed in 2009.

The Towers was designed by Adnan Saffarini.

== Armada Tower 1 ==
Located in Cluster P, plot 1, Armada Tower 1 has 36 floors and stands at 150 m (490 ft).

== Armada Tower 2 ==
Located in Cluster P, plot 2, Armada Tower 2 is the tallest of the three towers, standing at 167 m (548 ft) with 40 floors. which is mixed commercial building with international companies/organizations running their regional operations such as Aramco Subsidiaries, Armada Group, Armada BlueBay Hotel, Armada Hospital, Saint Petersburg State University of Economics and Finance, in addition to retail outlets like Armada Pharmacy, Mythos Kouzina & Grill (Greek restaurant) and Nola Eatery & Social House (New Orleans Bar).

== Armada Tower 3 ==
Located in cluster P, plot 3. Armada Tower 3 has 36 floors and stand at 150 m (490 ft). Armada Tower 3 is a Luxury Residential Tower providing Apartments in Jumeirah Lakes Towers. There are number of retail shops operating out of the same building such as Costa Coffee, MMI, Cavallo Nero Gents Salon.

== Photo gallery ==
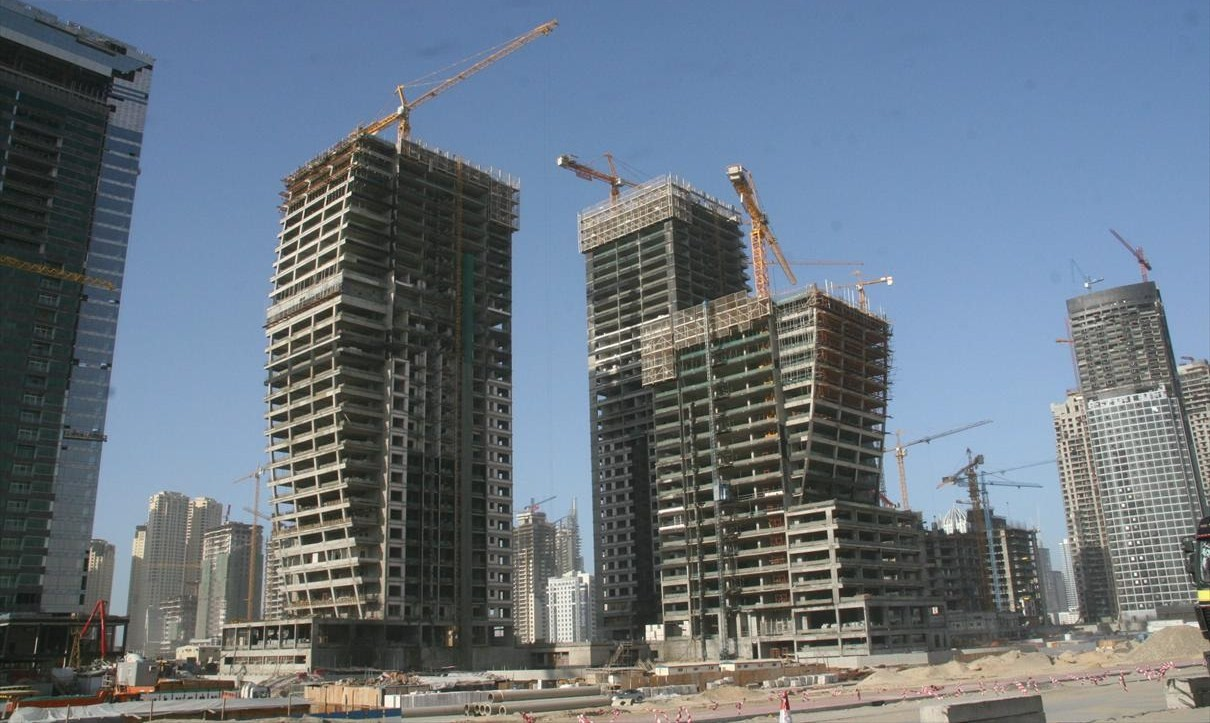
Armada Towers under construction in 2007

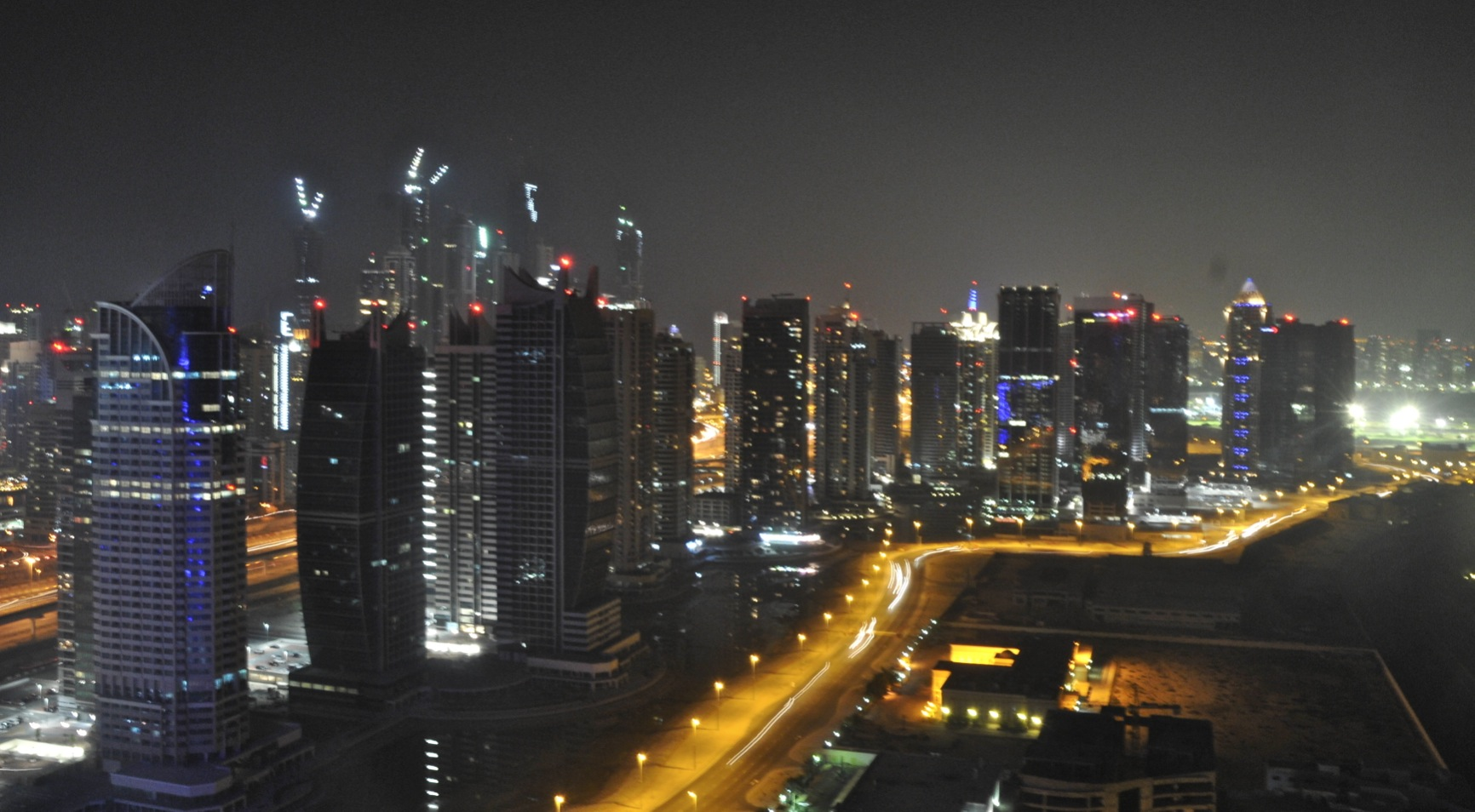
Armada Towers - Dubai Lake Towers

== See also ==
- List of tallest buildings in Dubai
