= Mazaya Business Avenue =

- Interactive map of the Mazaya Business Avenue area

General information
- Type: Commercial
- Location: Dubai, United Arab Emirates
- Coordinates: 25°04′8.005″N 55°08′44.479″E
- Estimated completion: July 2012

Technical details
- Floor count: AA1 - 45; BB1 - 45; BB2 - 45

The Mazaya Business Avenue project comprises three identical Commercial Towers on 5, 7 and 9 of Al Worood 3 Street. The Towers sit on the fringe of Jumeirah Islands and Jumeirah Lake Towers in Dubai, United Arab Emirates. The three identical towers are named as Mazaya Business Avenue AA1 (5, Al Worood 3 Street), Mazaya Business Avenue BB1 (7, Al Worood 3 Street) and Mazaya Business Avenue BB2 (9, Al Worood 3 Street). All of the towers stand at a height of 180 meters (591 ft), have 45 floors each and house predominantly commercial enterprises. Since the Building's completion in 2012, it has attracted Forbes Most Promising UAE Startup Companies and DMCC Most Innovative Startup

The closest Dubai Metro Station to the Towers is 800 metres away at Jumeirah Lakes Towers (Dubai Metro). There are many local amenities less than 450 metres away in Jumeirah Lake Towers including restaurants, cafes, fast food takeaways, supermarkets, and an Irish Bar.

== See also ==
- List of tallest buildings in Dubai
