= Dubai Marina =

District in Dubai, United Arab Emirates

Dubai Marina مرسى دبي
- District
- Marsa Dubai
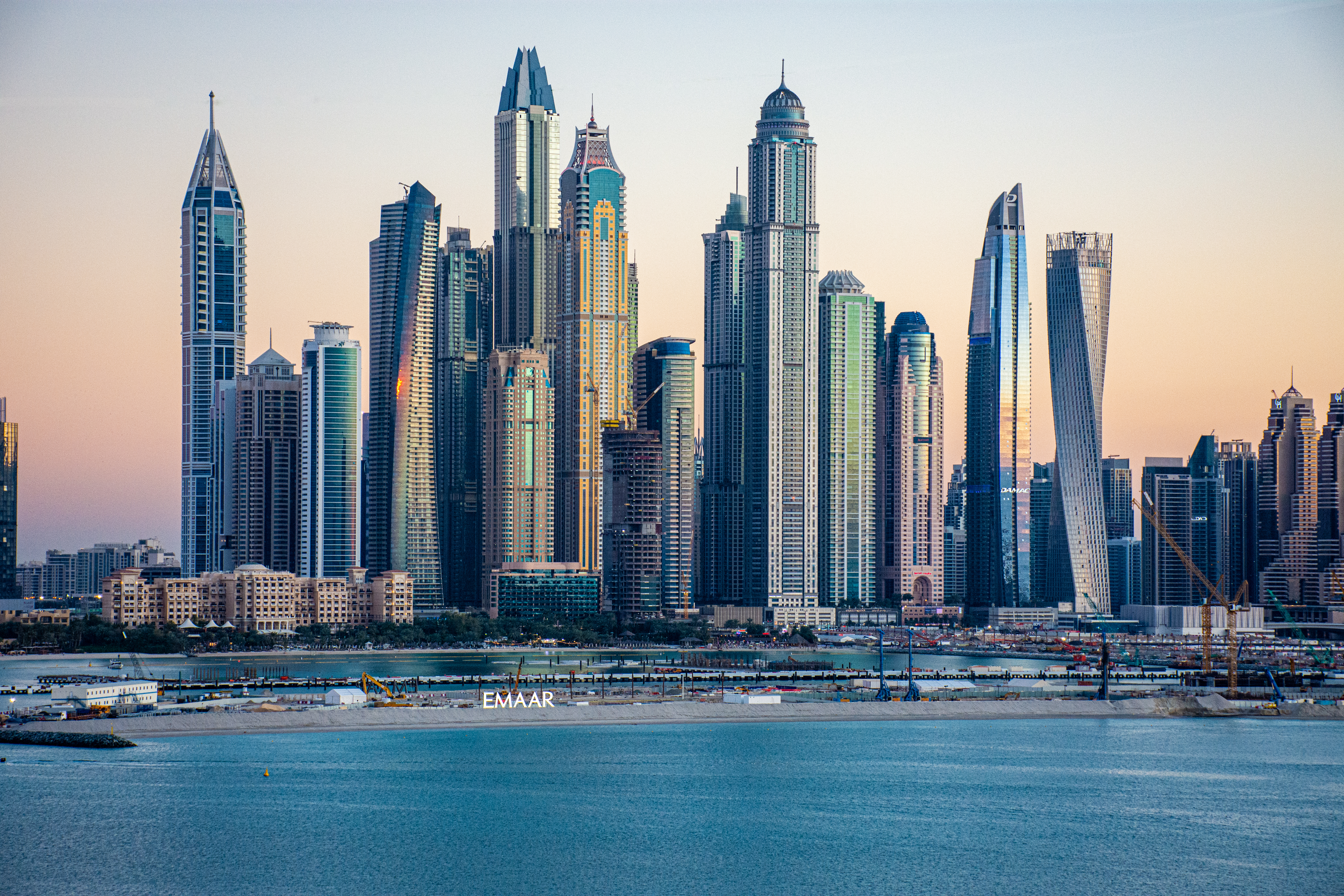
- Dubai Marina skyline

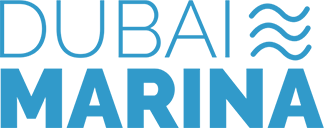
- Interactive map of Dubai Marina
- Coordinates: 25°4′52.86″N 55°8′38.67″E
- Country: United Arab Emirates
- Emirate: Dubai
- City: Dubai
- Established: 2003; 23 years ago

Area
  - Total: 4.9 km^{2} (1.9 sq mi)

Population (2024)
  - Total: 70,550
  - Density: 14,000/km^{2} (37,000/sq mi)
- Community number: 392

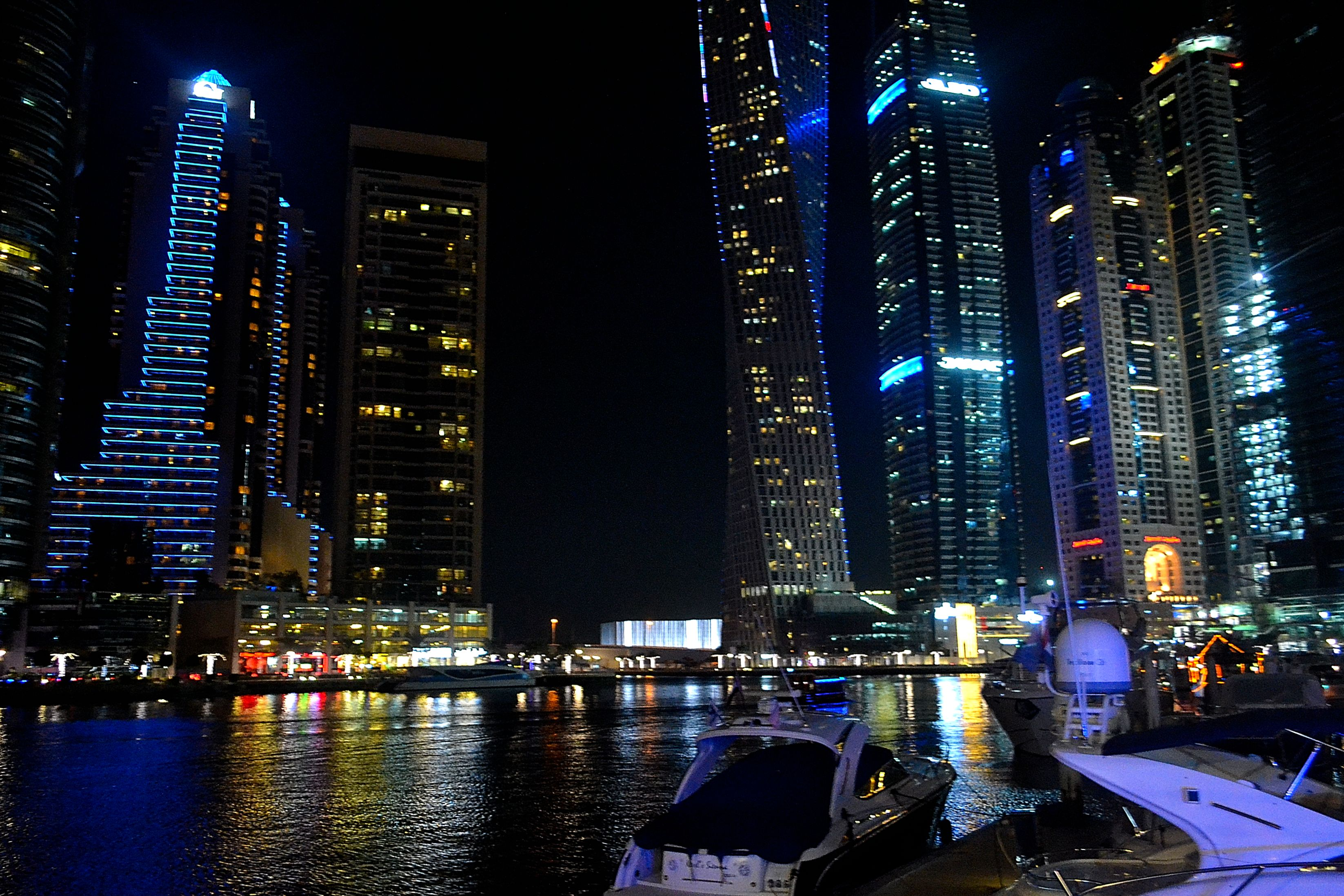
Dubai Marina skyline

Dubai Marina (Arabic: مرسى دبي), also known as Marsa Dubai, is a district in Dubai, United Arab Emirates. It is built around an artificially constructed canal along a 3-kilometre (2 mi) stretch of the Persian Gulf shoreline. In 2024 it had a population of 70,550.

The district can accommodate over 120,000 people, and is located on Interchange 5 between Jebel Ali Port and the area which hosts Dubai Internet City, Dubai Media City, and the American University in Dubai. The Dubai Marina was inspired by the Concord Pacific Place development along False Creek in Vancouver, Canada. There have been many instances of marine wildlife, especially whales and sharks, entering the marina because of its proximity to the open sea.

== Development ==
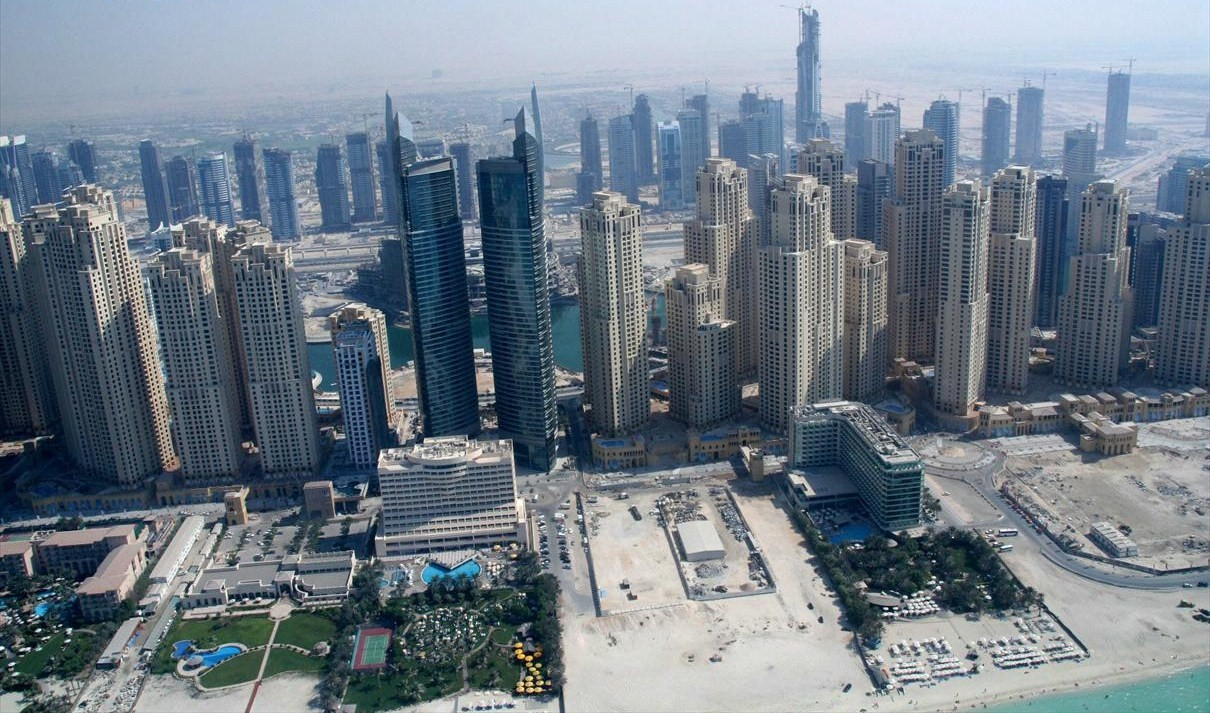
An aerial view of Dubai Marina towers, with Jumeirah Lake towers in the background

To create the marina, the developers brought the waters of the Persian Gulf into the site of the Dubai marina, creating a new waterfront. There is a large central waterway excavated from the desert and running the length of the 3-kilometre (1.9 mi) site. More than 12% of the total land area on the site has been given over to this central public space. Although much of this area is occupied by the marina water surface, it also includes almost 8 kilometres (5.0 mi) of landscaped public walkways.

The marina is entirely human-made and has been developed by the real estate development firm Emaar Properties of the United Arab Emirates and designed by HOK Canada. There is a publicly accessible foreshore-way around the marina and some sections of public ocean way along the beach with views to Palm Jumeirah. Its largest development is the Jumeirah Beach Residence. In October 2013, Dubai Marina opened its first mosque, Masjid Al Rahim, which is situated at the southern end of the Marina; its second mosque, Mohammed Bin Ahmed Almulla Mosque, opened in December 2016.

=== Phase I ===
The first phase of Dubai Marina covers 10 hectares (25 acres), which includes six freehold apartment buildings called the Dubai Marina towers. Phase I of Dubai Marina cost more than AED 1.2 billion. Three of the towers are named after precious stones: Al Mass, Fairooz, and Murjan; the other three are named after Arabic scents: Mesk, Anbar, and Al Yass. The scheme was designed by HOK and the contractors were Al-Futtaim Carillion and Nasah Multiplex.

=== Phase II ===
Phase II of Dubai Marina consists of high rise buildings which are mainly clustered into a block, known as Tallest Block in the world, with the majority of the skyscrapers ranging between 250 metres (820 ft) to 300 metres (984 ft) in height. This includes Cayan Tower, Ocean Heights, Marina Pinnacle, Sulafa Tower, and Ciel Dubai Marina which rises to 366 metres (1,201 ft).

=== Jumeirah Beach Residence ===
The Walk at Jumeirah Beach Residence (JBR) is a 1.7-kilometre (1.1 mi) strip at the ground and plaza level of the complex, developed by Dubai Properties. Completed in 2007, since opening officially in August 2008 it has become a tourist attraction.

=== Al Sahab ===
Al Sahab is a residential high-rise development that consists of two towers; the complex is on the waterfront and directly overlooks the largest bay of water at Dubai Marina. The buildings are in the northern end of the marina across from the Al Majara towers near the Marina Quays.

=== Marina Quays ===
Marina Quays is a complex designed by Arif & Bintoak, also responsible for the Concorde Tower. As of 2016, luxury penthouses in the buildings have sold for more than 10 million Dirham. In 2018, 5 million tonnes (11 billion pounds) of rock was added to create a breakwater for Marina Quays.

=== Dubai Marina Mall ===
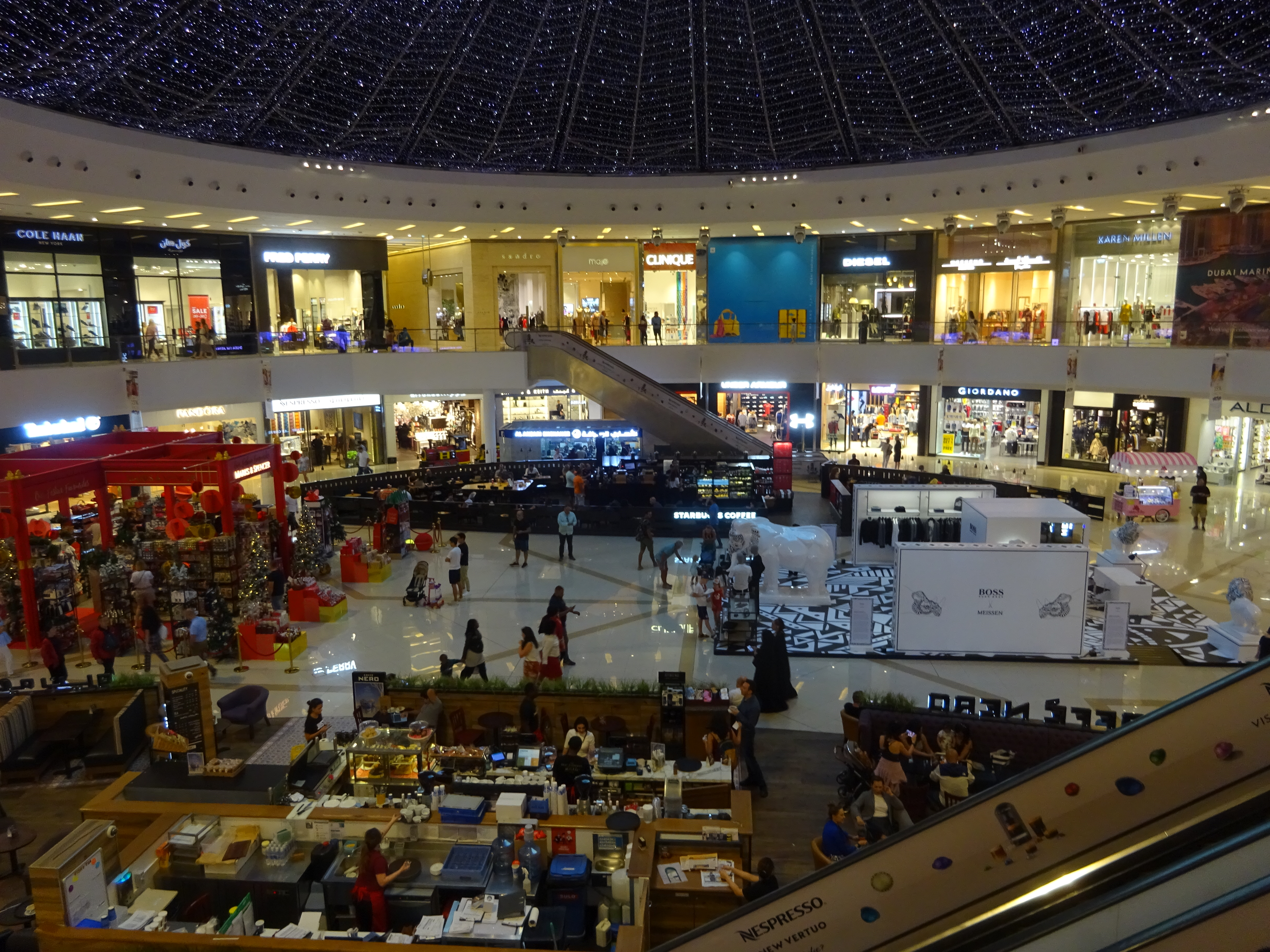
Interior view in the mall

Dubai Marina Mall is a shopping mall located in the centre of Dubai Marina. It features 140 retail outlets, spread over 3.6 hectares (9.0 acres) of gross leasable space. Opened in December 2008, the mall is linked to the 5-star JW Marriott Hotel Marina.

== Transportation ==
=== Sobha Realty (Dubai Metro) ===
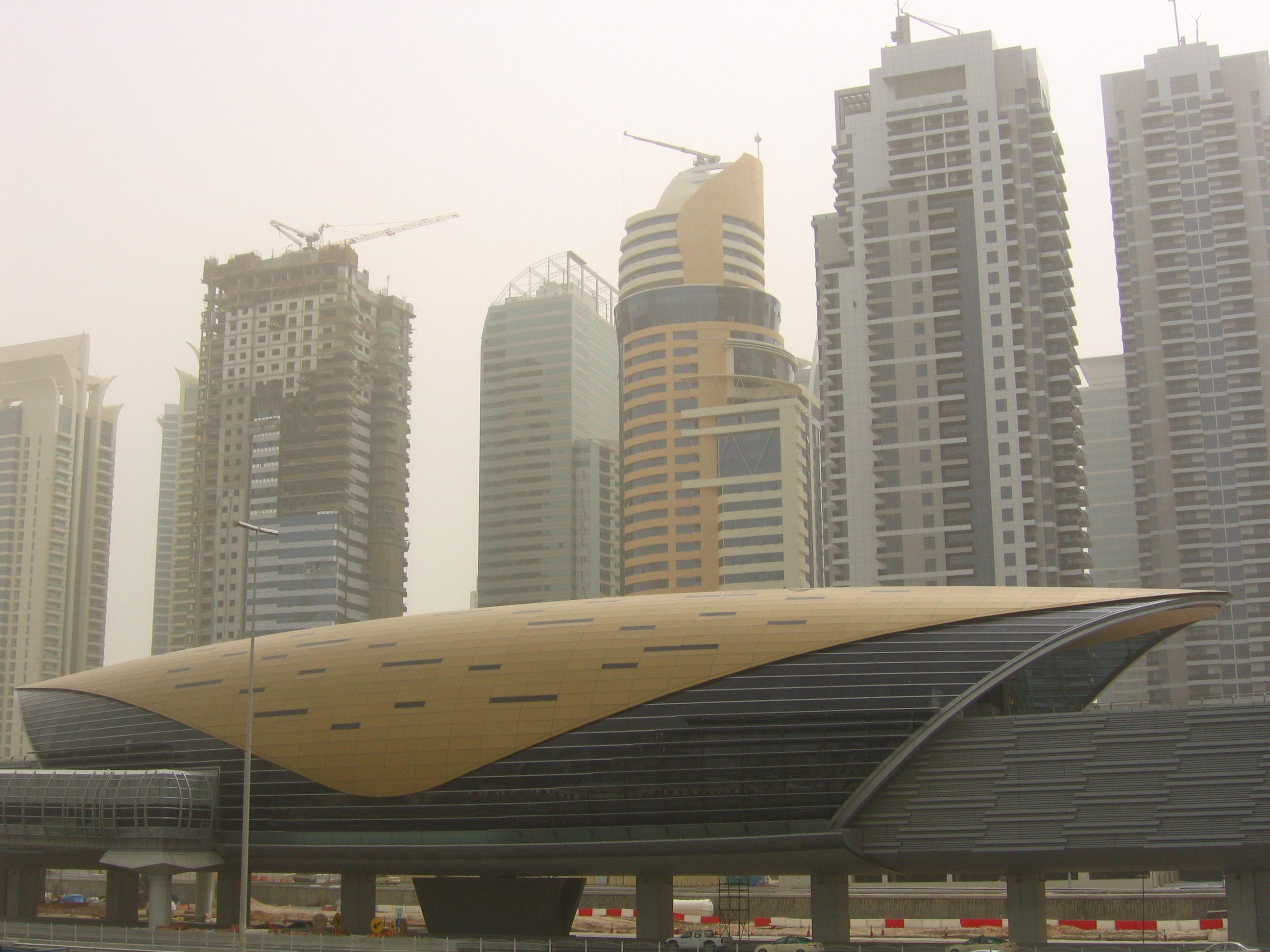
Sobha Realty

Sobha Realty (شوبا العقارية), originally called Dubai Marina, then Damac Station, is a rapid transit station on the Red Line of the Dubai Metro in Dubai. It was opened on 30 April 2010 as part of an extension to Ibn Battuta. Sobha Realty is located near Interchange 5 of Sheikh Zayed Road, around 20 kilometres (12 mi) southwest of downtown Dubai; to the east of the northern half of the Dubai Marina and the west of the northern portion of Jumeirah Lake Towers. The elevated station lies on a viaduct paralleling the eastern side of Sheikh Zayed Road. Pedestrian access to the station is aided through walkways above Sheikh Zayed Road, connecting to developments on either side of the road. In September 2014, it was renamed to Damac Station. The station's name was changed back to Dubai Marina in November 2020, before it was renamed to Sobha Realty on August 9, 2021.

=== Dubai Tram ===
Al Sufouh Tram operates in Al Sufouh, Dubai Marina, running 14.5 kilometres (9.0 mi) along Al Sufouh Road from Dubai Marina to the Burj Al Arab and the Mall of the Emirates. It interchanges with two stations of Dubai Metro's Red Line. The Sufouh Tram also connects with the Palm Monorail at the entrance of the Palm from Sufouh Road. Since completing in 2014, it has served the residences of Dubai Marina and Jumeirah Beach.

== Attractions ==
A zipline was installed which links Dubai Marina with the Dubai Marina Mall. The take-off platform is located at the top of an Amwaj Tower and is 170 metres (560 ft) above ground level. It has a top speed of 80 kilometres per hour (50 mph). XLine is a two-row ride where two people can ride side by side at the same time. There can only be one adult per row. XLine is located in the Dubai Marina Mall on level P. Another attraction is the Dubai Marina Walk, situated along the shoreline. The Dubai Marina Mall is a shopping and entertainment centre. In addition, Dubai Marina has a 3.5 kilometres (2.2 miles) long marina that is serviced by the Dubai Marina Yacht Club for yacht and dhow tours. Another major attraction in Dubai Marina is Skydive Dubai, which is arranged to give skydivers a bird's-eye view of Palm Jumeirah.

== Education ==
Emirates International School is close to Dubai Marina.

== Incidents ==
On 27 April 2006, a protest broke out among workers in Al Ahmadiya Contracting. During the protest, workers blocked the company's construction site at Dubai Marina and destroyed office property and documents. They also damaged eight cars and two buses and battered a site engineer. The crowd was later dispersed by the riot control wing of Dubai Police.

In August 2015, people including police officers were arrested after they were caught with prostitutes and illegal alcohol on a boat in Dubai Marina.

On 14 June 2025, a huge fire broke out in the 67-storey Marina Pinnacle, causing 4,000 people to flee.

== Gallery ==
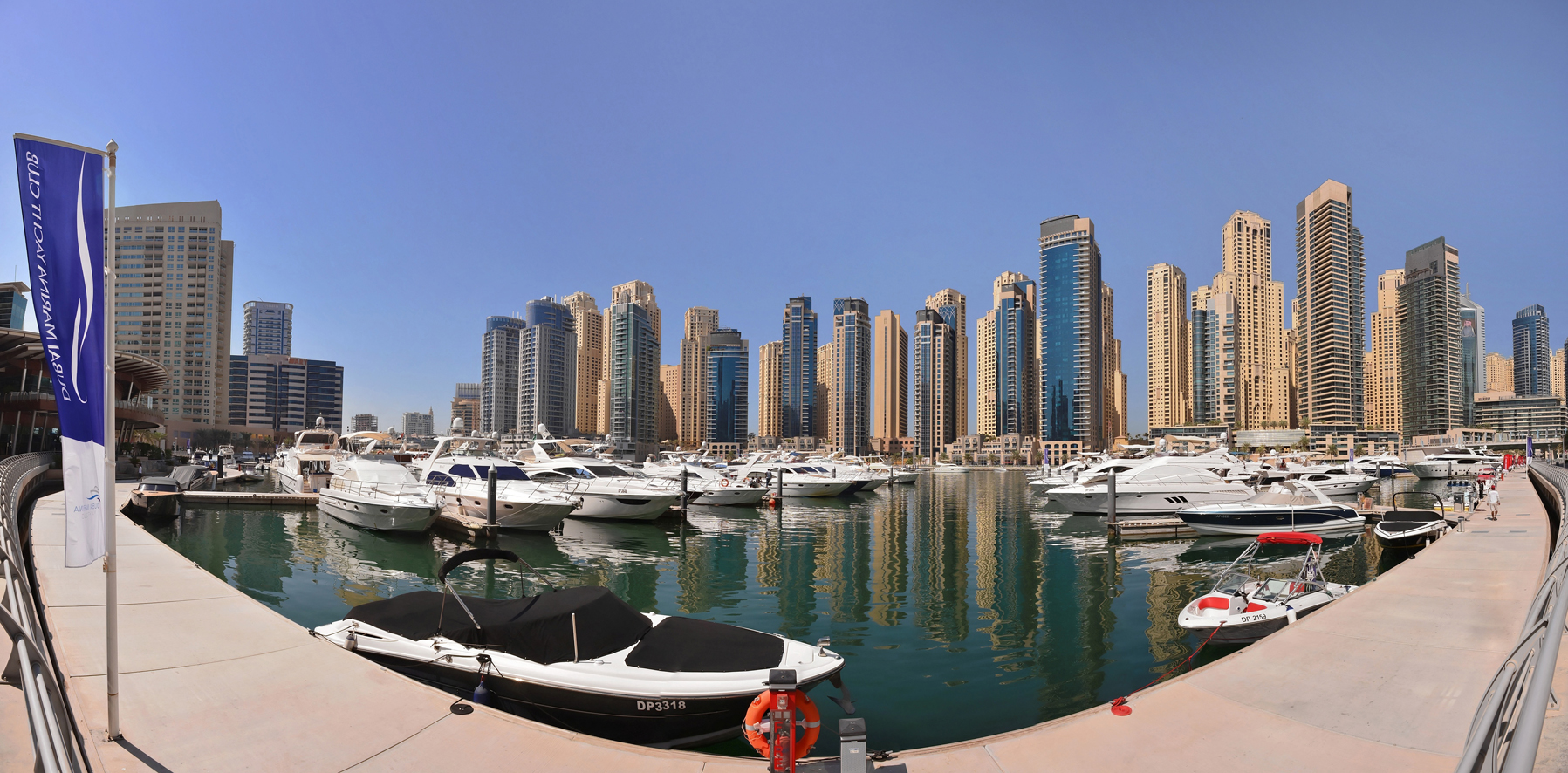
Dubai Marina panorama

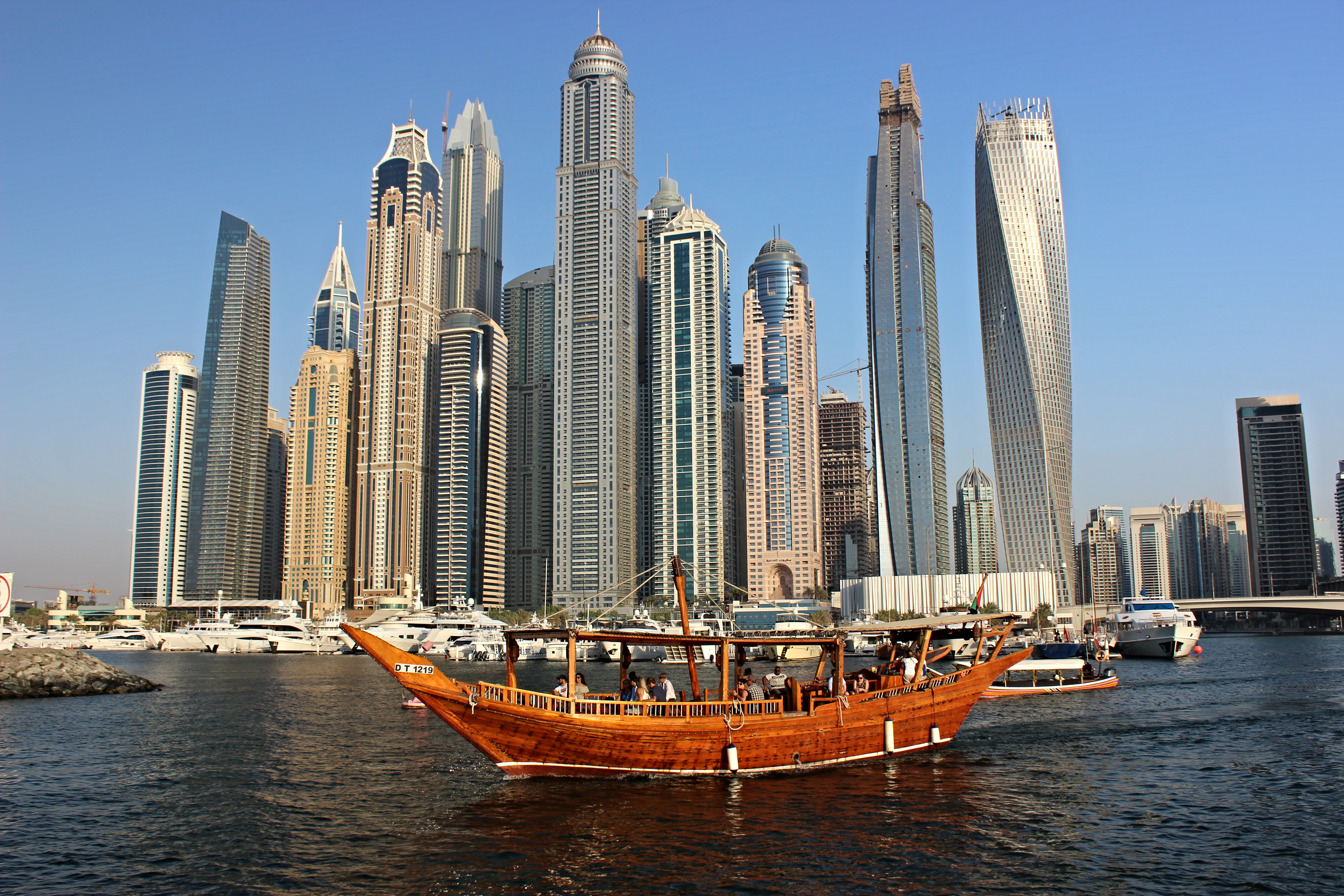
The tallest block

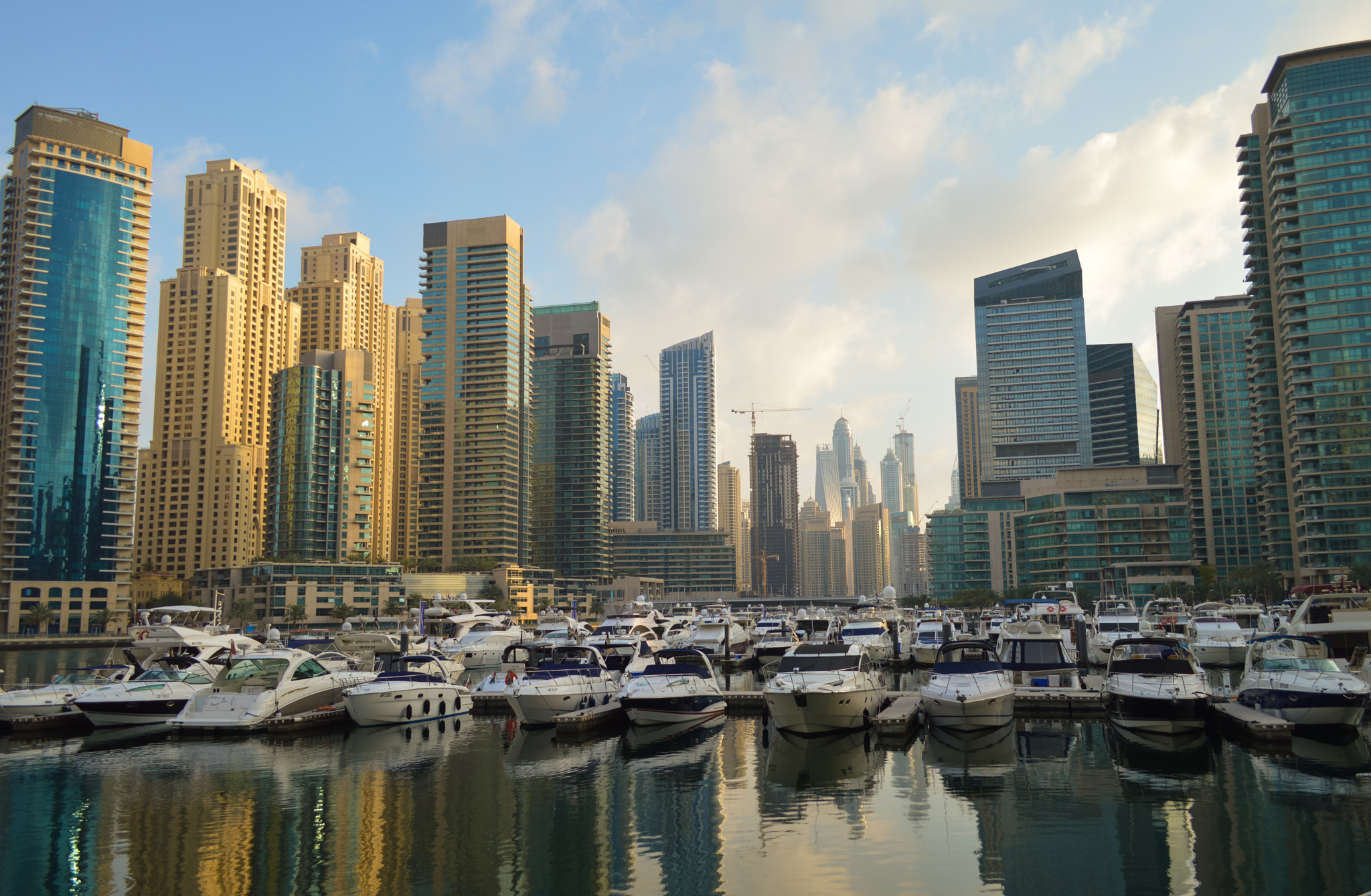
Another view

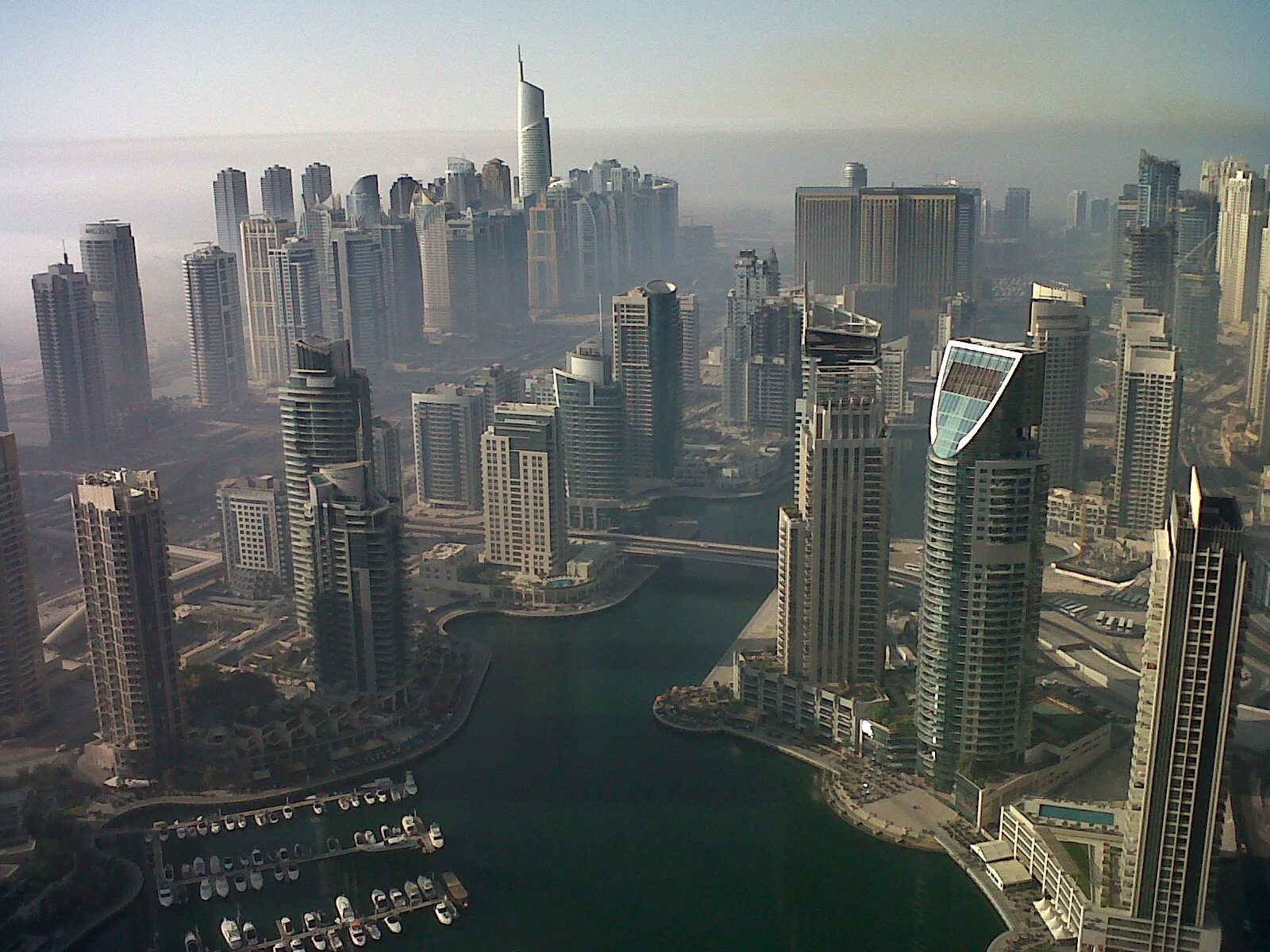
View of Dubai Marina from the 64th floor of the Marina Torch Tower

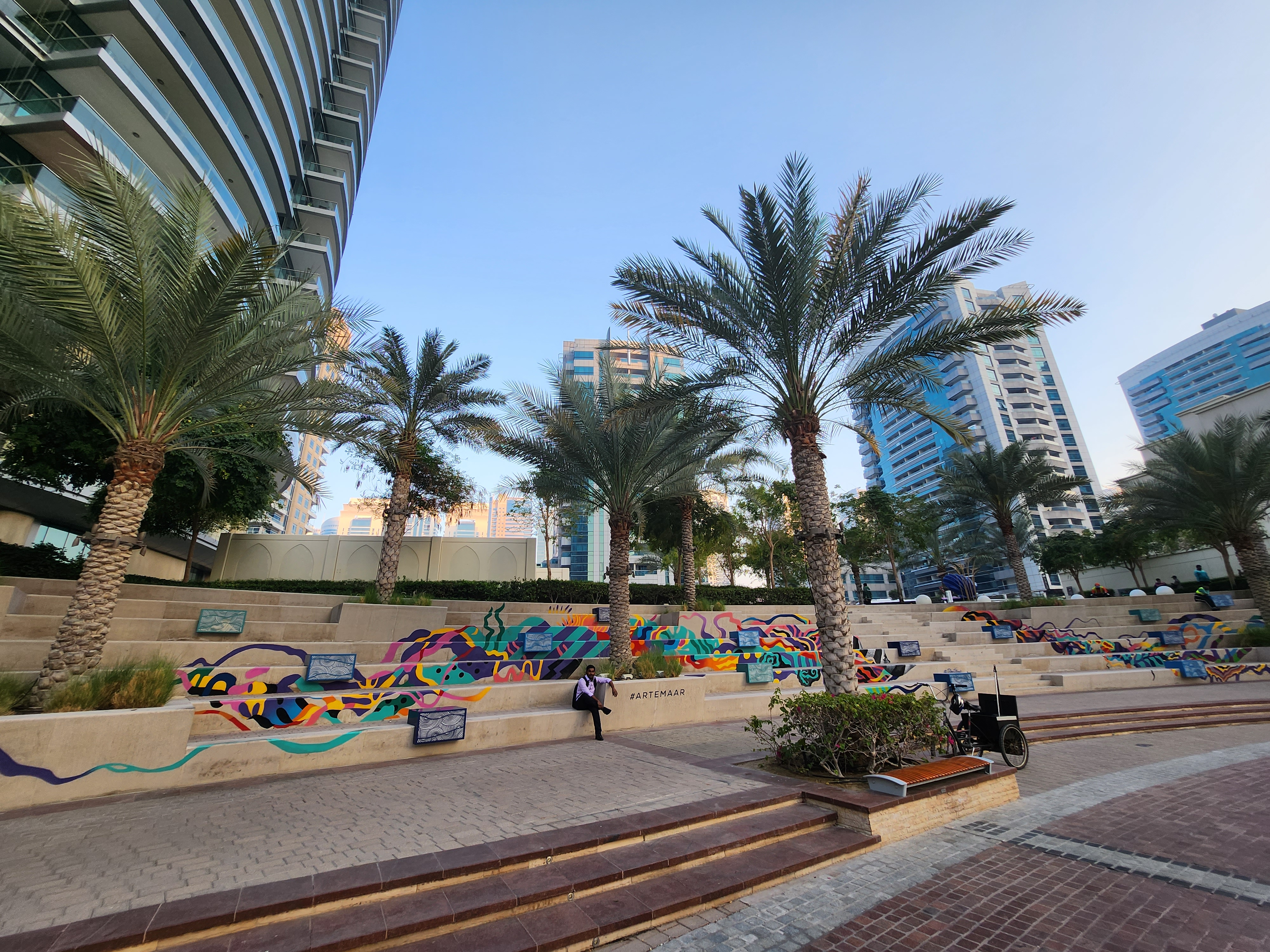
Graffiti in Marina Promenade

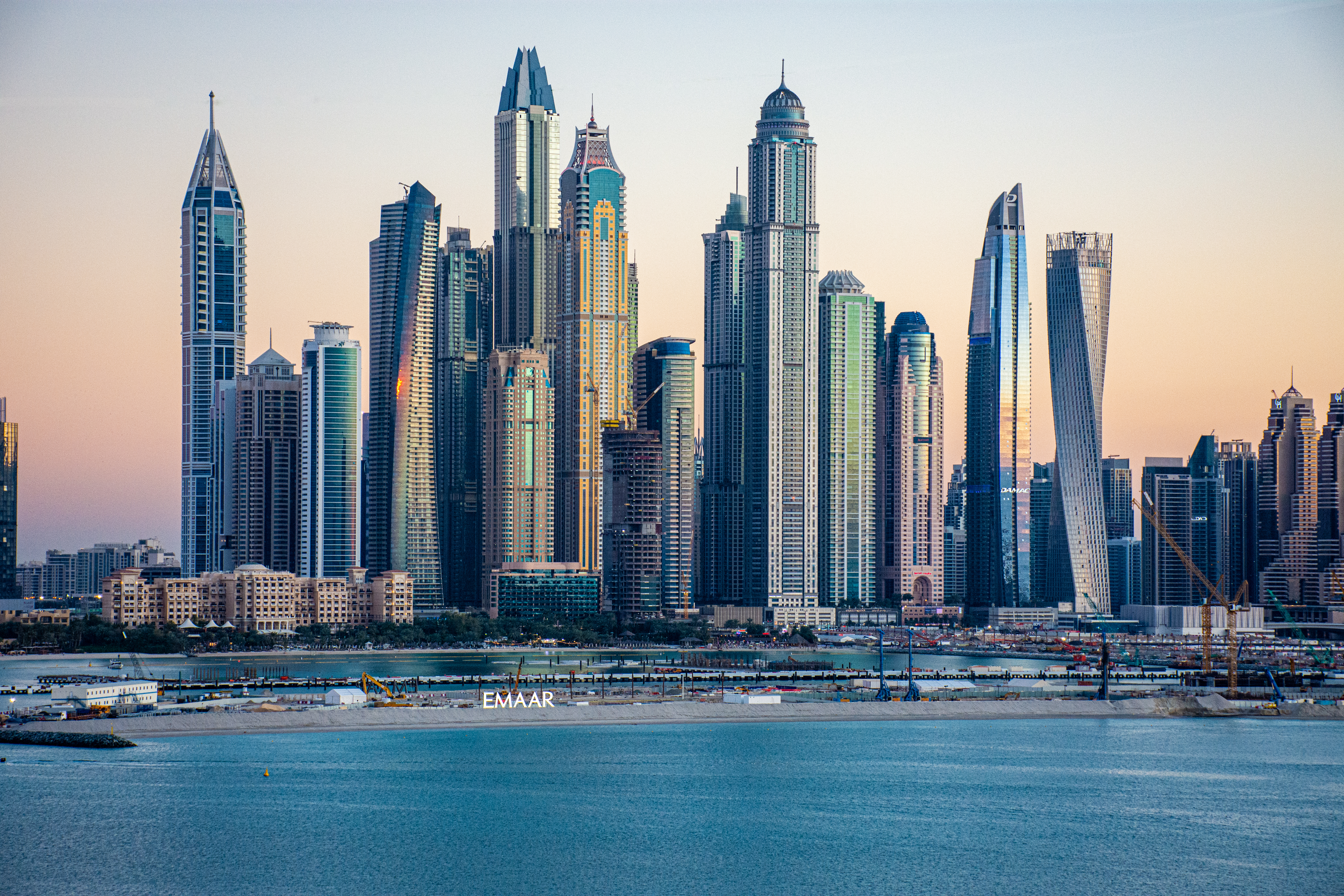
View from the harbor

== See also ==
- Bluewaters Island
- List of tallest buildings in Dubai
- List of tallest residential buildings in Dubai
