= Jumeirah Bay =

Community in Dubai, United Arab Emirates

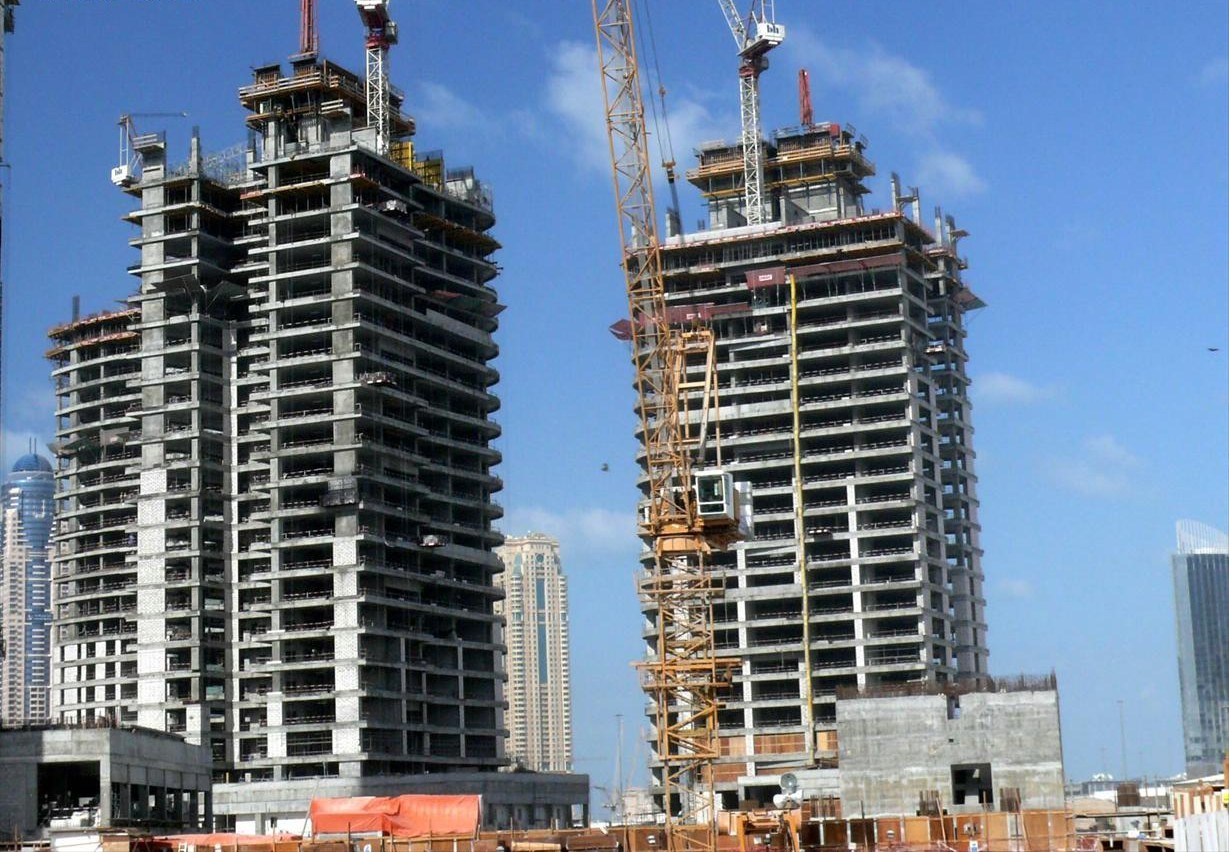
- Jumeirah Bay under construction on 8 January 2008
- Interactive map of the Jumeirah Bay area

General information
- Status: Completed
- Location: Dubai, United Arab Emirates
- Coordinates: 25°04′48.14″N 55°09′11.77″E
- Estimated completion: 2009

Technical details
- Floor count: 41, 47, 41

Design and construction
- Architect: National Engineering Bureau
- Developer: Nakheel Properties

Jumeirah Bay is a complex containing three skyscrapers in Jumeirah Lake Towers, Dubai, United Arab Emirates. The towers are located alongside one of the four lakes in the large Jumeirah Lake Towers project. All three buildings were designed by the National Engineering Bureau and were developed by Nakheel Properties.

The three towers in the complex are Jumeirah Bay X1, Jumeirah Bay X2 and Jumeirah Bay X3. Jumeirah Bay X2 stands as the tallest of the three and rises the closest to the shoreline. It has 47 floors. The height has not been revealed. Jumeirah Bay X1 and X3 both have 41 floors. However, height figures have not yet been released. The two towers may not be equal in height. The buildings are set back from Jumeirah Bay X2.

== See also ==
- Jumeirah Lake Towers
- List of tallest buildings in the United Arab Emirates
