= Jumeirah Lakes Towers =

Jumeirah Lakes Towers أبراج بحيرات الجميرا
- Community
- Interactive map of Jumeirah Lakes Towers
- Coordinates: 25.07557°N 55.14536°E
- Country: United Arab Emirates
- Emirate: Dubai
- City: Dubai

Area
  - Total: 1.8 km^{2} (0.69 sq mi)
- Website: jlt.ae

The Jumeirah Lakes Towers (JLT) (Arabic: أبراج بحيرات الجميرا) is a large development in Dubai, United Arab Emirates which consists of 80 towers constructed along the edges of three artificial lakes (Lake Almas West, Lake Almas East, JLT Lake) as well as the JLT Embankment of eight towers facing Jumeirah Islands.

Initially JLT had four lakes (Lake Almas West, Lake Almas East, Lake Elucio, Lake Allure) but in late 2012, the developer of JLT, DMCC, announced that lake Elucio would be drained and a 55,000 m^{2} (590,000 sq ft) park would be created instead. Subsequently, Lake Allure has been renamed to JLT Lake. The total area covered by the lakes, waterways and landscaping is 730,000-square-metre (7,900,000 sq ft). The towers range from 35 to 45 floors, except for the centerpiece (Almas Tower), which is 66 floors. The tallest tower and the centerpiece of the entire complex is Almas Tower, which is situated on its own island between Lake Almas West and Lake Almas East.

The completion of Saba Tower in December 2006 marked the first tower to be completed in Jumeirah Lakes Towers. The majority of construction took place in 2008. By April 2011, over 80 percent of the JLT towers were said to have been completed. As of June 2015 there were reported to still be 11 towers unfinished, either abandoned due to the 2009 crisis or still undergoing construction. The most prominent of these are Wind Tower 1 and Wind Tower 2 which are part of Cluster B and on Sheikh Zayed Road. Wind Towers 1 and 2 have been under construction for more than 12 years.

== Clusters ==
The towers in JLT proper are organized in 26 clusters of three named from A to Z, each cluster has its own parking structure and a retail waterfront.

== Location ==
JLT Dubai is located near Dubai Marina, Emirates Hills, Jebel Ali and Al Sufouh and borders Sheikh Zayed Rd. Jumeirah Lakes Towers on the Dubai map is located in the northwestern part of the city.

== List of towers ==
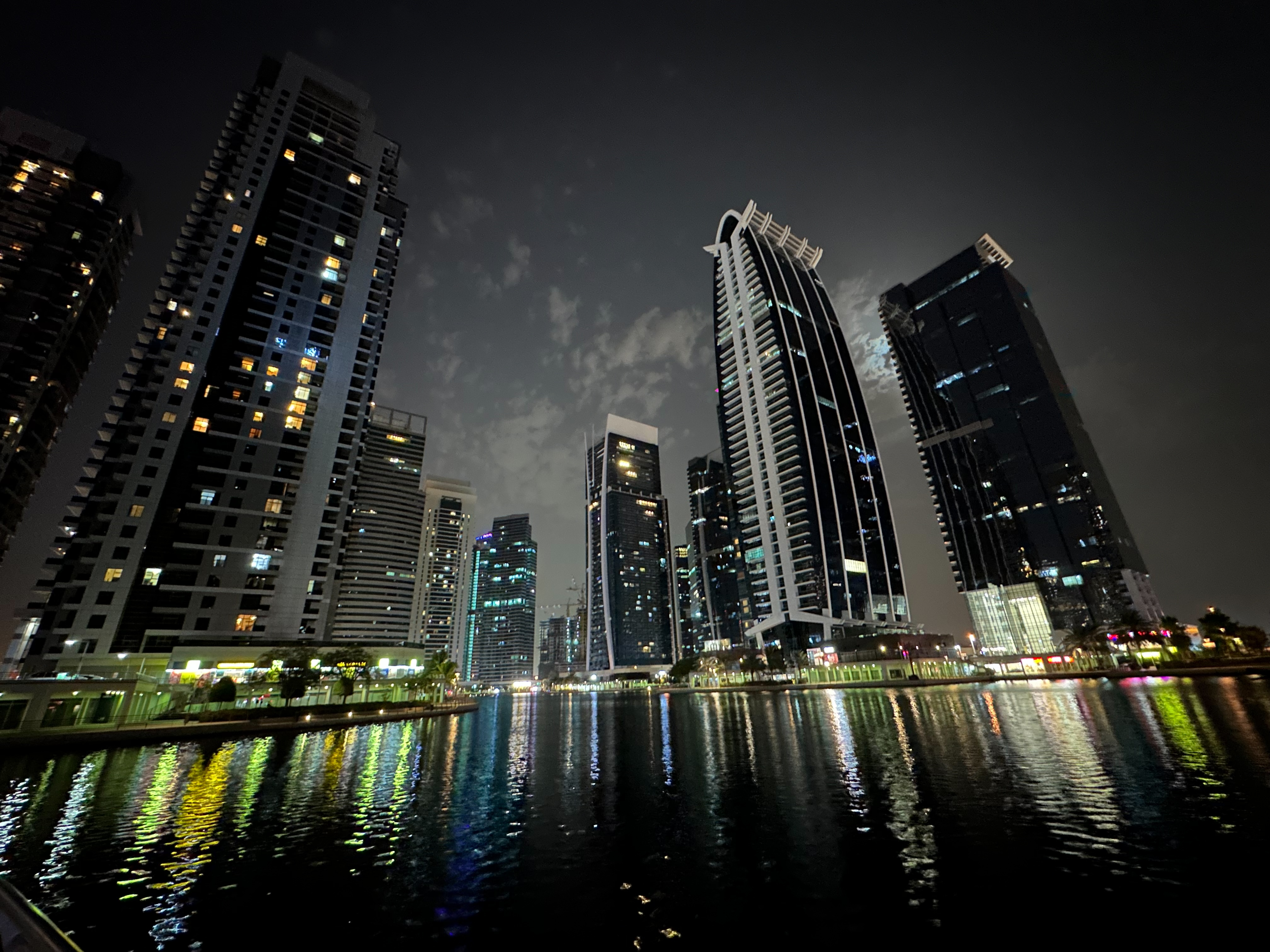
Jumeirah Lakes Towers at night with a view of the lake

Cluster	Tower 1	Tower 2	Tower 3	Other
A	A1 – Dubai Gate 2	A2 – Mövenpick Hotels & Residence	A3 – Lake Side Residence	
B	B1 – The Wind Tower II	B2 – Lake View	B3 – The Wind Tower I	
C	C1 – Fortune Tower	C2 – Gold Crest Executive	C3 – The Palladium	
D	D1 – Indigo Tower	D2 – Lake Terrace	D3 – Lake City Tower	
E	E1 – Global Lake View	E2 – Al Shera Tower	E3 – Saba Tower 1	
F	F1 – Bobyan Tower	F2 – HDS Tower	F3 – Indigo Icon (across from Indigo Tower)	
G	G1 – Dubai Arch Tower	G2 – JBC 1	G3 – Me Do Re 2	
H	H1 – JBC 7	H2 – Concorde	H3 – JBC 8	
I	I1 – Silver Tower	I2 – Platinum Tower	I3 – Gold Tower	
J	J1 – Goldcrest Views 2	J2 – Mohammed Ibrahim Tower	J3 – Bonnington Tower	
K	K1 - no current tower	K2 – MBL Residence	K3 - MBL Royal	Viewz by Danube (two towers)
L	L1 – ME DO RE	L2 – Preatoni Tower	L3 – Icon II	
M	M1 – HDS Business Centre	M2 – no current tower	M3 – Icon I	
N	N1 – The Dome Tower	N2 – Lake Point Tower	N3 – JBC 4	
O	O1 – Reef Tower	O2 – O2 Residence	O3 – Madina Tower	
P	P1 – Armada 1	P2 – Armada 2	P3 – Armada 3	
Q	Q1 – SABA 3	Q2 – Dubai Gate 1	Q3 – SABA 2	
R	R1 – Al Waleed Paradise	R2 – MAG 214 Tower	R3 – MBL Signature	
S	S1 – Green Lakes Tower 1	S2 – Green Lakes Tower 2	S3 – Green Lakes Tower 3	
T	T1 – Fortune Executive Tower	T2 – 1 Lake Plaza	T3 – Pullman Jumeirah Lakes Towers	
U	U1 – Al Seef Tower 3	U2 – Al Seef Tower 2	U3 – Tamweel Tower	
V	V1 – JBC 2	V2 – Goldcrest Views 1	V3 – V3 Tower	
W	W1 – JBC 5	W2 – Tiffany Tower	W3 – Oaks Hotel Apartments	
X	X1 – Jumeirah Bay X1	X2 – Jumeirah Bay X2	X3 – Jumeirah Bay X3	
Y	Y1 – JBC 3	Y2 – Lakeshore Tower	Y3 – Swiss Tower	
Z	Z1 – Jumeirah Lake Apartments	Z2 – Anantara Hotel	Z3 – Jumeirah Lake Offices	
AA	AA1 – Business Avenue	AA2 – Amesco Tower	AA3 – Corporate Tower	
BB	BB1 – Business Avenue	BB2 – Business Avenue	BB3 – SABA 4: 222 m (728 ft); 47 floors	
JLTFZ	Almas Tower			
Stand Alone Building	Taj Jumeirah Lakes Towers			
Jewellery and Gemplex	Jewellery & Gemplex Building 1	Jewellery & Gemplex Building 2	Jewellery & Gemplex Building 3	

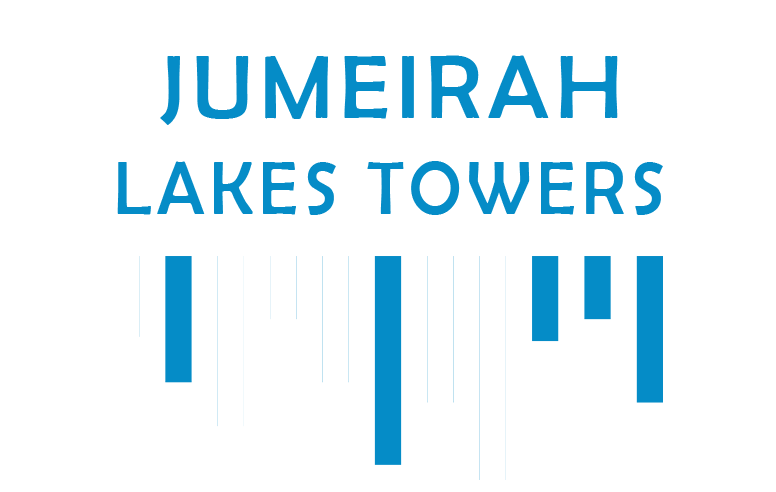
Official Logo

== Population and facilities ==
The project is estimated to have a resident population of around 60,000 and a working population of another 120,000; it will include five children's playgrounds, three mosques, a 55,000 m^{2} (590,000 sq ft) park (reshaped from Lake Elucio in 2013–2014), a police station, a civil defense station, a hospital and other facilities.

There are two available Dubai metro stations along the site: Sobha Realty (previously Dubai Marina) and DMCC (previously Jumeirah Lakes Towers) stations.

== Fires ==
On 18 January 2007, a fire broke out at around 12:30 pm on the upper storeys of the 34-storey Fortune Tower, which was under construction in Dubai. The blaze sent plumes of thick black smoke across the skyline, killed two workers, and injured at least 40 others. An investigation found that burning welding material had ignited wooden scaffolding, and construction of the tower was delayed for several months as a result. The Fortune Tower's construction was delayed for several months.

In addition, there was a smaller fire reported at the reception area of Tamweel Tower in the U cluster. The only reported injury was an infant who was taken to the hospital to be treated for minor smoke inhalation.

JLT includes the Al Seef Towers, a group of three apartment buildings. One of these, the Tamweel Tower, was gutted by fire in November 2012. The tower was repaired by the end of 2016.

On April 22, 2018, a fire broke out in Almas Tower and all residents were evacuated. No injuries were reported according to Dubai Civil Defence.

== Reviews ==
Jumeirah Lakes Towers has become a popular mixed-use community, according to Ahmed Bin Sulayem, Executive Chairman and Chief Executive Officer of DMCC.

== Builders ==
Most construction workers were from the Indian subcontinent.

== Public transportation ==
JLT is accessible via two metro stations - DMCC and Sobha Realty. Both of these are on the Red Line of the Dubai Metro.

== Further developments ==
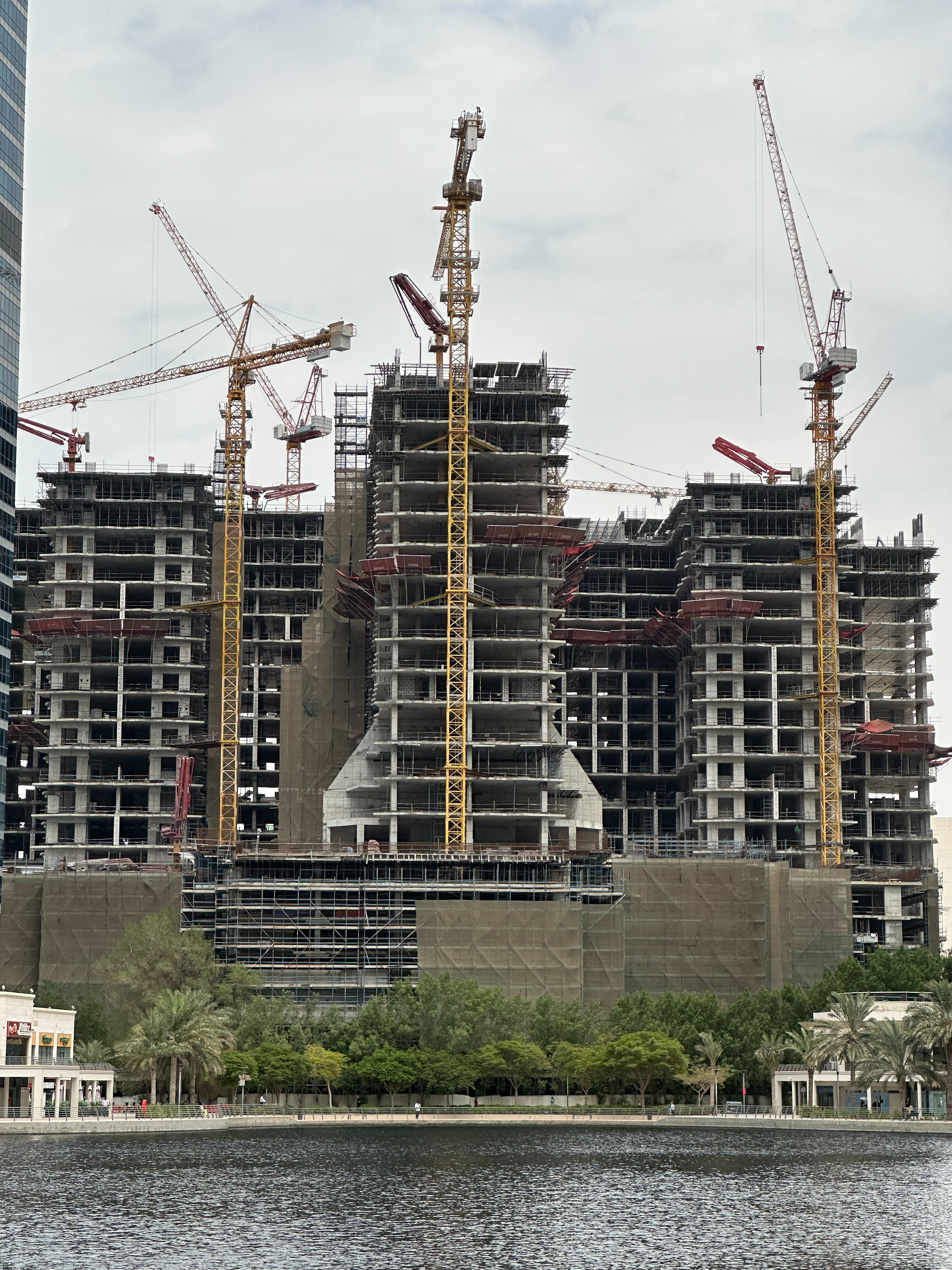
Cluster Z in Jumeirah Lake Towers (JLT) under construction as of August 2024

Cluster Z is planned to be a single mixed-use development instead of the three towers per cluster for the rest of JLT. The property developer is Seven Tides. Cluster Z is planned to include a large retail offering in addition to residential units. As of August 2024, the project is under construction.

== See also ==
- Dubai Multi Commodities Centre
- Dubai Ports World
- Almas Tower
- Armada Towers
