= Wissam al-Zahawie =

Iraqi ambassador

Wissam al-Zahawie was a former official in Saddam Hussein Baathist Iraq government who held many offices including that of Iraq's non-resident Ambassador to the Holy See and Iraq's Ambassador to the United Nations.

Al-Zahawie was said to have been involved with Saddam Hussein's alleged efforts to acquire yellowcake uranium from Niger in Africa. This alleged attempt by Hussein to purchase uranium is highly controversial, with skeptics commonly stating that the claim has been discredited and/or is generally considered to have been the product of an elaborate hoax, and with supporters of Coalition efforts in Iraq stating that the claim is in fact true. Al-Zahawie himself denies the claim, stating that he was in Niger to get the president of that country to visit Baghdad, and not to arrange for purchases of yellowcake in violation of the U.N. embargo. An investigation by the Iraq Survey Group uncovered no evidence to support claims that Iraq was pursuing uranium from foreign governments.

Al-Zahawie is known to be a fan of Western classical music, especially that of Bach and Mozart.
