= Dubai Civil Defence =

- الدفاع المدني دبي
- Map showing the jurisdiction of Dubai Civil Defence
- Active: 17 June 1962
- Country: Dubai; United Arab Emirates
- Branch: Government of Dubai
- Type: Firefighting; Search and Rescue; Prevention
- Size: 3,500+ personnel
- Part of: Government of Dubai
- Headquarters: Al Qusais
- Website: www.dcd.gov.ae

Commanders
- Commander in Chief: Lieutenant General Expert Rashid Thani Rashid Al Matrooshi
- Deputy Commander in Chief: Major General Jamal bin Aded Al Muhairi

Dubai Civil Defence, (Arabic: الدفاع المدني - دبي), also known as the General Command of Dubai Civil Defence, is a local government entity specialized in emergency management and incident response in the Emirate of Dubai within the United Arab Emirates. It operates under the authority of the Government of Dubai and is responsible for the protection of lives and property, firefighting, disaster and emergency response, and the enhancement of the public safety system, in accordance with applicable local legislation and in coordination with relevant federal authorities.

The General Command of Dubai Civil Defence is led by Lieutenant General Expert Rashid Thani Rashid Al Matrooshi, and is considered one of the fundamental pillars of the safety and emergency management system in the Emirate of Dubai, as well as an active component within the civil defence framework at the level of the United Arab Emirates.

== History ==
=== Early establishment in Dubai ===
The Emirate of Dubai demonstrated early institutional awareness of the importance of organizing firefighting services and protecting lives and property. During the nineteenth session of the Dubai Municipality Council held on 17 June 1962, Resolution No. (202) of 1962 was issued to establish a limited firefighting force, serving as the initial nucleus of an organized fire brigade capable of future expansion in line with the Emirate's urban and economic growth requirements.

This resolution represented the foundational step in establishing an official firefighting system in Dubai and contributed to laying the institutional groundwork for the subsequent development of civil protection and safety services.

=== Federal establishment ===
Following the establishment of the United Arab Emirates, and within the framework of unifying security efforts and strengthening the safety system at the federal level, Federal Supreme Council Resolution No. (4) of 1976 was issued on 6 November 1976, based on the recommendations of a specialized security mission, providing for the establishment of the General Directorate of Civil Defence under the Ministry of Interior.

The resolution stipulated the integration of existing firefighting units across the member emirates into a unified federal structure, ensuring operational integration and the standardization of policies and standards in the field of civil defence.

It was also decided under this framework to convert certain civilian positions within firefighting units into military ranks, with the aim of enhancing institutional discipline and aligning the nature of the work with field responsibilities and the requirements of emergency and disaster response.

=== Institutional development in Dubai (2003–2018) ===
Dubai Civil Defence witnessed a phase of institutional transformation and expansion beginning in 2003, when Rashid Thani Rashid Al Matrooshi assumed the position of Director General of the General Directorate of Civil Defence in Dubai. This period was marked by significant growth in human resources, infrastructure, and operational readiness.

During the period from 2003 to 2018, institutional development included the following:

The workforce increased from 591 employees in 2003 to 2,180 employees in 2018 (including 1,604 military personnel and 472 civilians).

The number of civil defence stations increased to 26 stations, compared to two stations at the time of the Union's establishment in 1971 and 8 stations in 2003.

Approximately 65,000 buildings and facilities were connected to the smart monitoring system operating around the clock (24×7) to enhance preventive safety and early response.

Large-scale evacuation drills and readiness exercises were conducted, alongside qualitative development of firefighting and rescue fleets, and the development of innovative specialized vehicles and equipment to support field operations.

=== Local establishment in Dubai ===
As part of the advanced institutional development witnessed by the Emirate of Dubai, and in strengthening local governance of the civil defence system, Law No. (4) of 2025 was issued on 7 April 2025, in accordance with applicable local legislation in the Emirate, and published in the Official Gazette of the Government of Dubai.

The law provided for the establishment of the General Command of Dubai Civil Defence and defined its general framework and competencies, supporting enhanced readiness and emergency response, while maintaining coordination and integration with relevant federal entities.

=== Institutional identity (2025) ===
On 30 December 2025, the General Command of Dubai Civil Defence announced the launch of its new institutional identity as part of a comprehensive framework to update the organization's visual system, reflecting its developmental direction and future aspirations in the field of public safety.

== Leadership ==
Directors and Commanders of Dubai Civil Defence
Name	Years of Service		Notes
Name	From	To	Notes
Major General Hamid Ali Saif Al Nuaimi	1976	1994	|Assumed the duties of Director of Civil Defence in Dubai pursuant to a ministerial decision in 1976.
Brigadier Ali Al Sayyid Ibrahim Al Sadah	1994	2003	|Appointed Director General by ministerial decision in 1994.
Lieutenant General Expert Rashid Thani Rashid Al Matrooshi	2003	Present	Served as Director General since 2003, then as Commander in Chief since 2025 to the present.

== Roles and responsibilities ==
The responsibilities of Dubai Civil Defence include the protection of lives and property, firefighting, response to incidents, emergencies and disasters, enhancement of the public safety system, and the provision of related preventive and regulatory services within its jurisdiction in the Emirate.

== Departments ==
The General Command of Dubai Civil Defence operates under the leadership of the Commander-in-Chief and his deputy. The Commander-in-Chief oversees an organizational system comprising supervisory offices and specialized sectors, and organizes a number of general departments concerned with field operations, prevention, institutional support, and strategic development.

=== General Department of Operations ===
The General Department of Operations constitutes the operational core of the General Command of Dubai Civil Defence. It is responsible for coordinating all emergency and incident responses around the clock. The department supervises civil defence stations distributed across the various areas of the Emirate and coordinates firefighting operations, land and marine rescue, hazardous materials incidents, and industrial disasters.

The department also relies on advanced electronic communication and monitoring systems, including instant reporting systems and the integration of buildings and facilities with early warning alarm systems, to ensure rapid response and reduce response time to incident locations.

=== General Department of Prevention and Safety ===
This department is responsible for regulating and implementing fire safety and protection requirements in the Emirate of Dubai. Its duties include reviewing and approving engineering plans, issuing licenses and permits, conducting inspection and monitoring campaigns on facilities, and ensuring compliance with approved standards.

The department also oversees smart prevention systems and the connection of buildings to the electronic monitoring system operating around the clock (24×7), thereby reinforcing the concept of proactive prevention.

=== General Department of Institutional Support ===
This department is concerned with administrative, financial, and logistical matters, and supports field operations by providing qualified human resources, managing budgets, securing supplies and equipment, and developing technical infrastructure.

It includes specialized departments for human resources, financial affairs, procurement, support services, and information technology.

=== General Department of Strategy and Institutional Excellence ===
This department is responsible for developing strategic plans, monitoring performance indicators, and applying best practices in government excellence.

It also oversees institutional innovation programs, digital transformation, and the development of smart systems, in alignment with the Government of Dubai's directions toward leadership and sustainability.

=== General Department of Training and Qualification ===
This department is responsible for preparing and implementing specialized training programs for civil defence personnel and enhancing their professional competencies, in coordination with the Dubai Civil Defence Academy, to ensure a high level of operational readiness.

=== Other Departments ===
- Hazardous Materials Department
- Search and Rescue Department
- Stations Department
- Corporate Communication Department
- Internal Audit Department
- Legal Affairs Department
- Innovation and Development Department
- Smart Systems Department

== Services ==
The General Command of Dubai Civil Defence provides a range of services, most notably:

- Company accreditation services
- Engineering plans services
- Firefighting and rescue services
- Hazardous materials services
- Licensing and inspection services
- “Hassantuk” services
- Community awareness

== Smart Systems (Hassantuk) ==
The Hassantuk system is one of the smart systems associated with enhancing readiness and early incident response. It specializes in real-time detection and reporting of alarms and in connecting buildings and facilities through a 24/7 monitoring system across the Emirate.

== Vision, Mission, and Values ==
Vision: To make Dubai the best city in the world in ensuring the safety of lives and property.

Mission: To operate effectively and efficiently to enhance the quality of life of Dubai's community through innovative, proactive, and sustainable services to safeguard lives and property.

Values: Loyalty and sacrifice; tolerance and good conduct; transparency and integrity; efficiency and readiness; teamwork; leadership and innovation; sustainability.

== Vehicles and Equipment ==
Dubai Civil Defence operates an advanced fleet of firefighting and rescue vehicles, including specialized operational solutions to support response across diverse environments. This includes the inauguration of the world's first mobile and sustainable floating fire station to enhance coverage, secure maritime events, and accelerate response.

== Dubai Civil Defence Academy ==
The Dubai Civil Defence Academy specializes in qualifying and training human cadres and enhancing their professional competencies, within the organization's institutional development framework and operational readiness system.

== Emergency Number ==
The emergency number for Dubai Civil Defence is 997.

== See also ==
- Government of Dubai
