= List of buildings in Dubai =

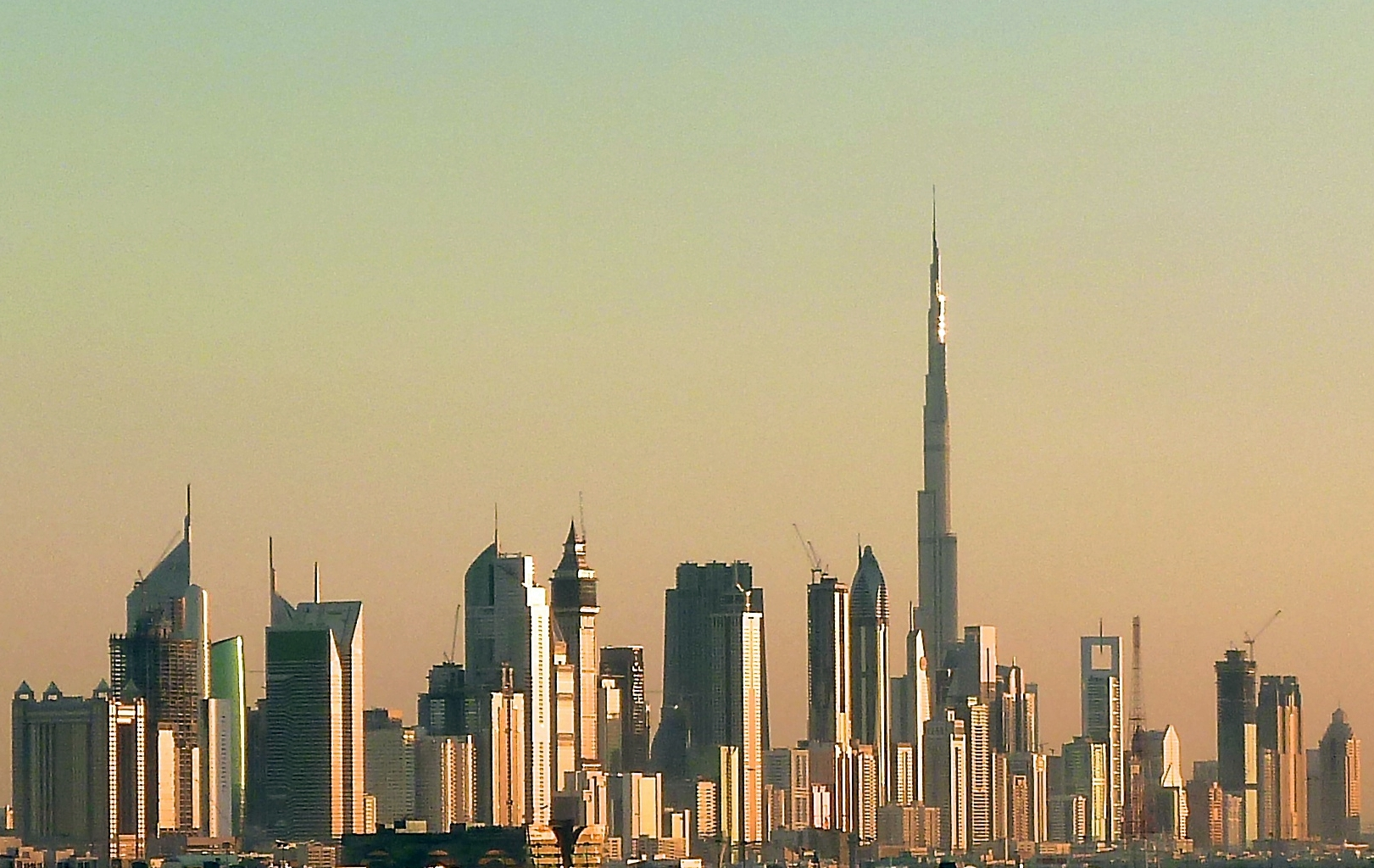
The Dubai skyline in 2010, a few months after Burj Khalifa completion

The 828-metre (2,717 ft) tall Burj Khalifa in Dubai has been the world's tallest building since 2009. It has been classified as Megatall.

Below is a list of notable buildings in Dubai. Dubai has a varied set of buildings and structures in different architectural styles. Many modern interpretations of Islamic architecture can be found here due to a boom in construction and architectural innovation in the Arab World in general, and in Dubai in particular, supported not only by leading Arab or international architectural and engineering design firms such as Al Hashemi and Aedas, but also by top firms of New York and Chicago in the United States. As a result of this boom, modern Islamic – and world – architecture has been taken to new levels in skyscraper building design and technology. Dubai now has more completed or topped-out skyscrapers higher than 2/3 km (2,200 ft), 1/3 km (1,100 ft), or 1/4 km (820 ft) than any other city.

== Completed buildings ==
=== Transportation ===
- Dubai International Airport- five terminals, four concourses, eight hangars, control tower
- Al Maktoum International Airport- one terminal, one hangar, control tower
- Dubai Metro- 55 stations, three depots
- Dubai Tram- 11 stations, one depot
- Palm Monorail- five stations including a hybrid station/depot/on-hold highrise development

=== Hotels ===
The following buildings are dedicated hotels.

The Address

- Aloft Palm Jumeirah
- Anantara World Islands Dubai Resort
- Andaz by Hyatt Palm Jumeirah
- Armani Hotel (Housed within the Burj Khalifa)
- Atlantis, The Palm Royal Towers
- Burj Al Arab
- C Central Resort The Palm
- Carlton Downtown, occupying the Angsana Hotel Tower
- Centara Mirage Beach Resort Dubai
- Côte d' Azur Resort Dubai World Islands
- Dukes The Palm, A Royal Hideaway Hotel
- Dusit Thani Dubai
- The Fairmont Dubai
- Fairmont The Palm
- FIVE Palm Jumeirah
- Gevora Hotel (currently the world's tallest dedicated hotel)
- Grand Hyatt Dubai
- Hatta Fort Hotel
- Hilton The Palm
- Holiday Inn Deira Islands
- Hyatt Regency
- Jumeirah Beach Hotel
- Jumeirah Emirates Towers Hotel, occupying Emirates Tower Two
- Jumeirah Zabeel Saray
- JW Marriott Marquis Dubai
- Kempinski Mall of the Emirates
- Madinat Jumeirah
- Marriott Resort Palm Jumeirah
- NH Collection Dubai The Palm
- One & Only The Palm
- Radisson Beach Resort Palm Jumeirah
- Radisson Royal Hotel Dubai
- Raffles The Palm Dubai (not affiliated with Raffles Hotels and Resorts)
- The Retreat Palm Dubai MGallery By Sofitel
- RIU Dubai
- Rixos The Palm Hotel
- Rose Rayhaan by Rotana
- Royal Central Hotel The Palm
- Sarai Apartments
- Shangri-La Hotel
- Sofitel Dubai The Palm Rsort and Spa
- Taj Exotica Resort and Spa
- Taj Exotica Resort and Spa Palm Jumeirah
- Tamani Hotel Marina
- Voco Dubai Palm Jumeirah
- W Dubai The Palm
- Waldorf Astoria

=== Hospitals ===
==== Healthcare Facilities under Dubai Health Authority (DHA) ====
- Carewell Medical Center (Carewell Clinics JVC)
- New Al Shefa Clinic Ophthalmology, Gynecology, Aesthetics, Botox, Dental (Dr. Sidra Khan),Implantologist Jumeirah Lake Towers, HDS Business, 17th Floor
- Armada Hospital, Armada One Day Surgical Center, Jumeirah Lake Towers, Armada Towers, Armada Group (private)
- Armada Medical Center, Jumeirah Lake Towers, Armada Towers
- Aster Hospitals, (Mankhool, Qusais)
- Burjeel Hospital for Advanced Surgery, Dubai (private)
- Dr. Helena Taylor Clinic FZ LLC (private)
- Dubai Hospital, (Dubai Health Authority)
- Dubai Cosmetic Surgery Clinic
- Dubai Herbal and Treatment Centre (private), multispeciality alternative medicine
- Enfield Royal Clinic (private)
- Emirates Hospital Jumeirah, Dubai (private)
- Kings College Hospital, Dubai (private)
- Mediclinic Welcare Hospital Dubai (Mediclinic International)
- Mediclinic Parkview Hospital (Mediclinic International)
- Medeor 24x7 Hospital, Dubai (private)
- Perfect Doctors Clinic (private)
- Prime Hospital, Dubai (private)
- Rashid Hospital, (Dubai Health Authority)
- Saudi German Hospital Dubai, Dubai (private)
- Zulekha Hospitals, Al-Nahda, Dubai

==== Healthcare Facilities under Dubai Healthcare City (DHCC) ====
- Dr. Sulaiman Al-Habib Medical Center
- Mediclinic City Hospital (Mediclinic International)
- Moorfields Eye Hospital Dubai (affiliated with Moorfields Eye Hospital in London)
- Clemenceau Medical Center - Dubai (affiliated with Clemenceau Medical Center International)
- Iranian Hospital, Dubai

=== Healthcare Facilities under Emirates Health Services (EHS) ===
- Al Amal Psychiatric Hospital
- Al Awir Health Center
- Al Baraha Smart Medical Examination Center for Residency
- Al Ittihad Health Center
- Al Kuwait Hospital
- Al Muhaisnah Health Center
- Al Nahda Medical Examination Center for Residency
- Al Quoz Medical Examination Center for Residency
- Al Reffa Medical Examination Center for Residency
- Dragon Mart Medical Examination Center for Residency
- Dubai Public Health Center
- Dubai Specialized Dental Center
- Ibn Battuta Medical Examination Center for Residency
- Salah Al Din Medical Examination Center for Residency
- Saraya Medical Examination Center for Residency

== Developments ==
- Dubai Marina

== Mosques ==
- Al Farooq Omar Bin Al Khattab Mosque
- Grand Mosque
- Iranian Mosque, Bur Dubai
- Iranian Mosque, Satwa
- Jumeirah Mosque

=== Museums and attractions ===
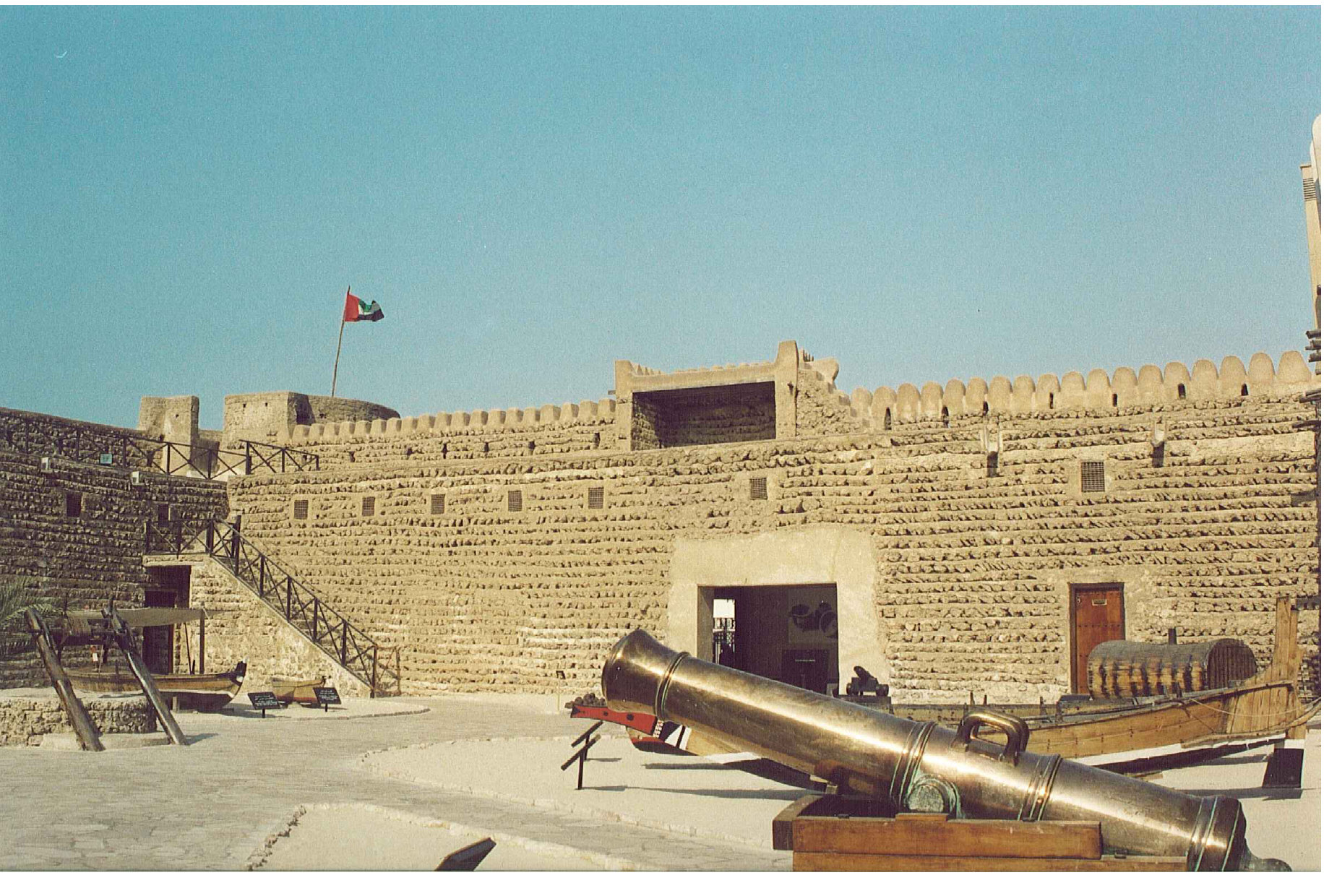
The courtyard at Dubai Museum

- Al Ahmadiya School
- Dubai Moving Image Museum
- Dubai Museum
- Etihad Museum
- Madame Tussauds Dubai
- Museum of the Future
- The Green Planet
- Saeed Al Maktoum House
- Salsali Private Museum
- Sheikh Obaid bin Thani House
- The Mine

=== Resorts ===
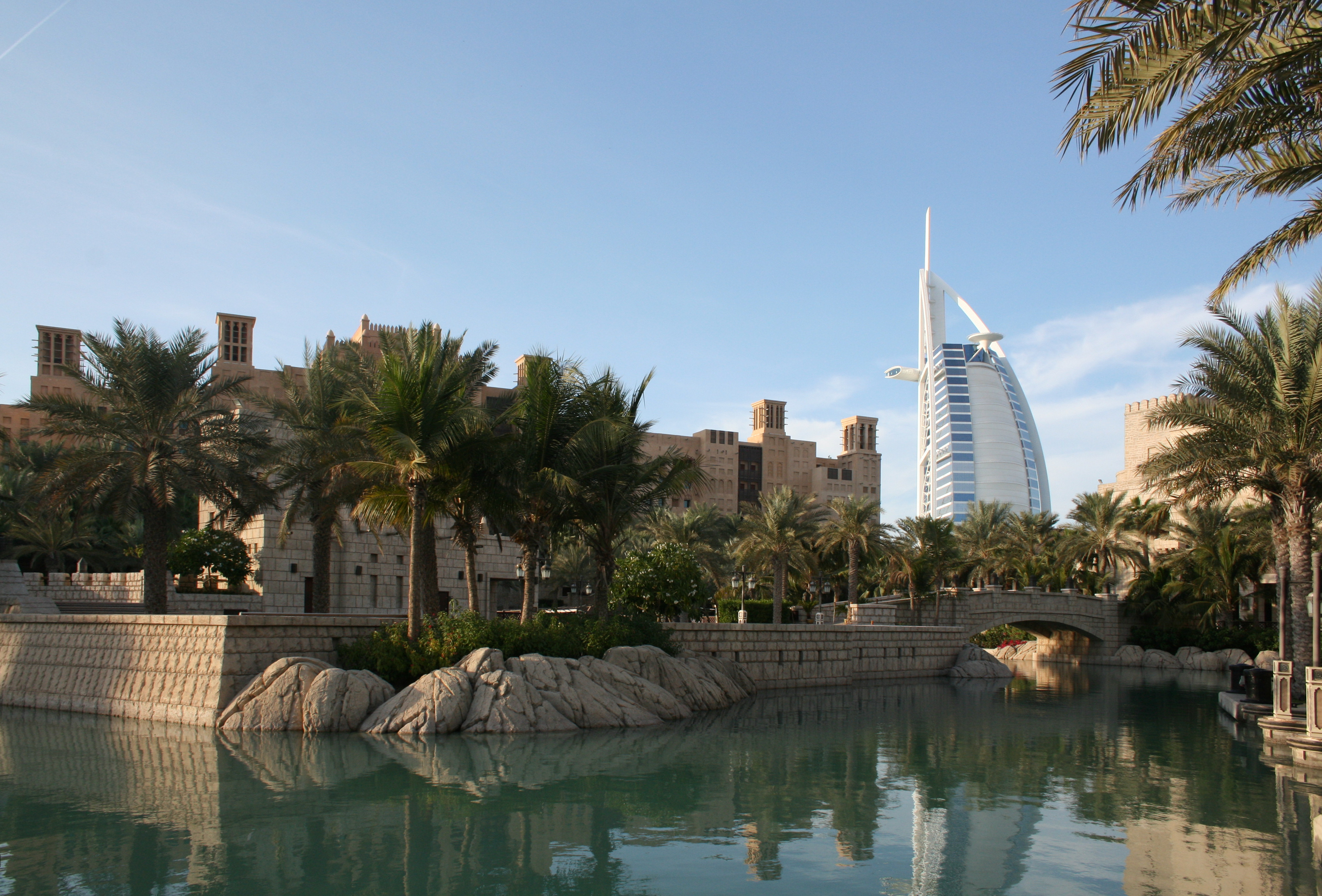
A view of Madinat Jumeirah

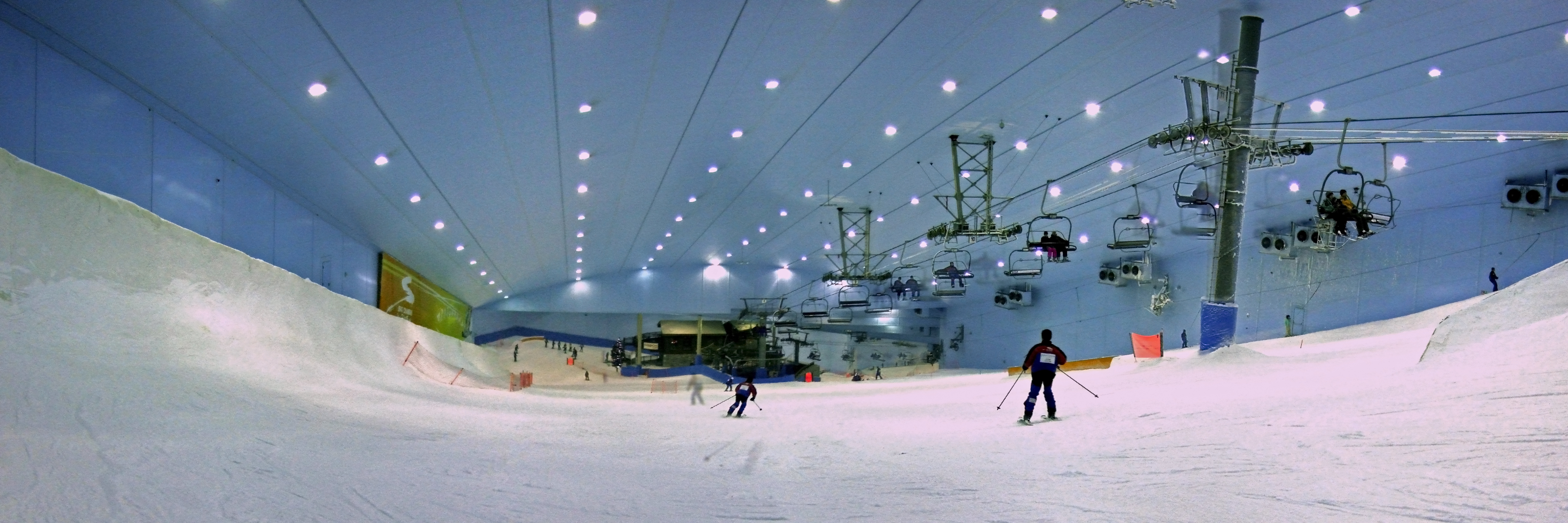
One of the indoor ski slopes at Ski Dubai

- Atlantis, The Palm
- Deira Island
- Dubai Parks and Resorts
- Jumeirah Zabeel Saray
- Madinat Jumeirah
- Palm Grandeur
- Palm Islands
- Palm Jebel Ali
- Ski Dubai

=== Restaurants ===
- Iranian Club, Dubai
- Rustar Floating Restaurant
- Verre

=== Schools ===
- Al Ameen School
- Al-Mizhar American Academy
- Arab Unity School
- Buds Public School, Dubai
- Clarion School
- DPS Academy
- Dubai English Speaking College
- Dubai International Academy
- Dubai International School
- Dubai Modern High School
- Dubai National School, Al Barsha
- Dubai National School, Al Twar
- Dubai Scholars Private School
- Emirates International School
- English College Dubai
- English Language School, Dubai
- GEMS World Academy
- Greenfield Community School
- Greenwood International School
- Gulf Indian High School
- The Indian High School, Dubai
- JSS Private School
- Jumeira Baccalaureate School
- Jumeirah College
- Jumeirah English Speaking School
- Latifa School for Girls
- New Indian Model School
- Our Own High School
- Rashid School For Boys
- St. Mary's Catholic High School, Dubai, UAE

==== Universities and colleges ====
- Dubai International Academic City
- Al Falah University
- Al Ghurair University
- American University in Dubai
- American University in the Emirates
- Birla Institute of Technology and Science, Pilani – Dubai Campus
- British University in Dubai
- Canadian University of Dubai
- Dubai Medical College
- Dubai Men's College
- Dubai Pharmacy College
- Dubai School of Dental Medicine
- Mohammed bin Rashid School of Government
- ENGECON Dubai
- Hamdan Bin Mohammed Smart University
- Heriot-Watt University Dubai
- Hult International Business School
- Institute of Management Technology, Dubai
- International Horizons College
- Mahatma Gandhi University
- Manipal University Dubai
- Murdoch University Dubai
- Rochester Institute of Technology of Dubai
- Saint Joseph University - Dubai
- Saint-Petersburg State Economic University (Dubai branch)
- Shaheed Zulfikar Ali Bhutto Institute of Science and Technology
- MODUL University Dubai
- University of Dubai
- University of Wollongong in Dubai
- Zayed University

=== Shopping malls ===
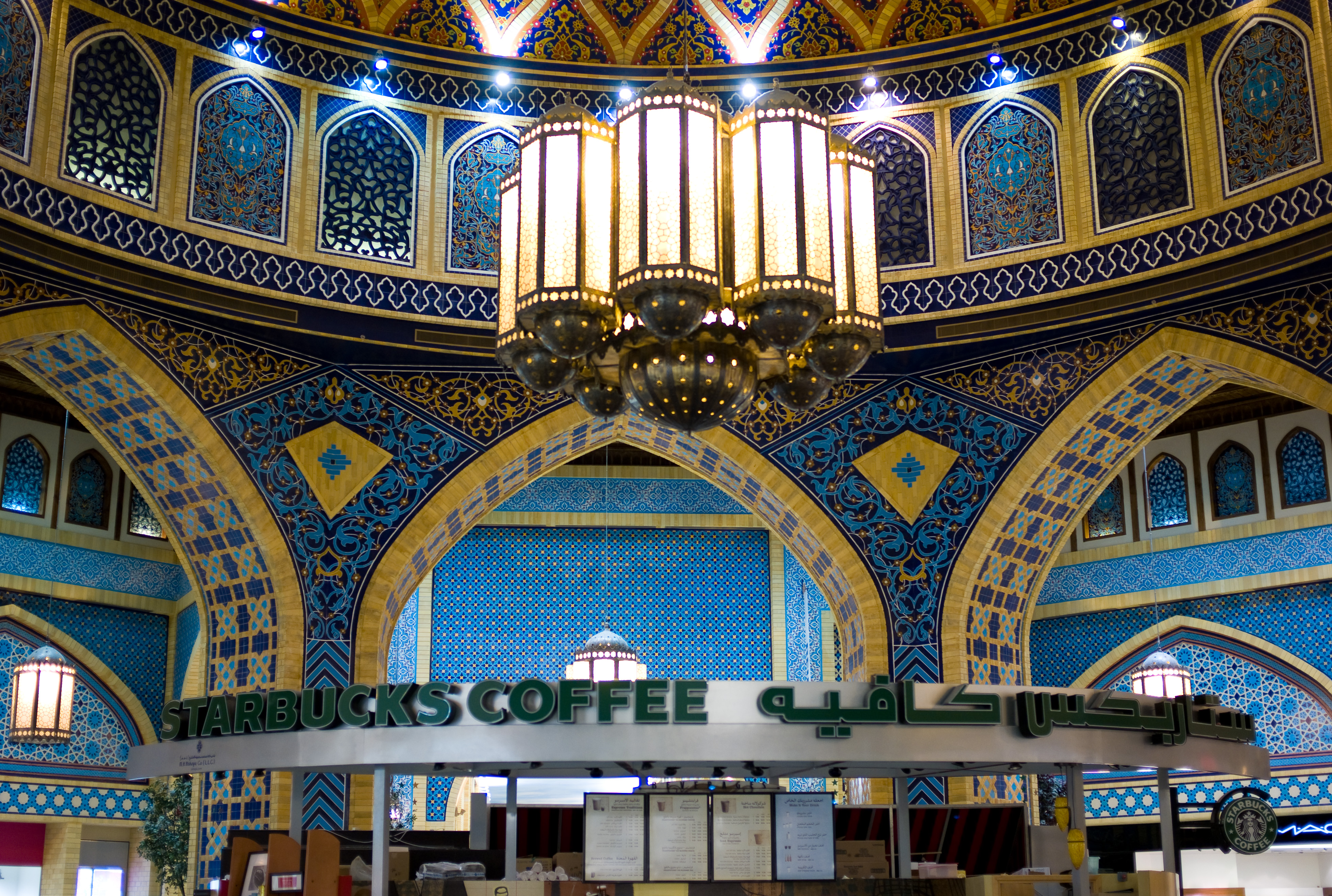
The Persian Court at Ibn Battuta Mall

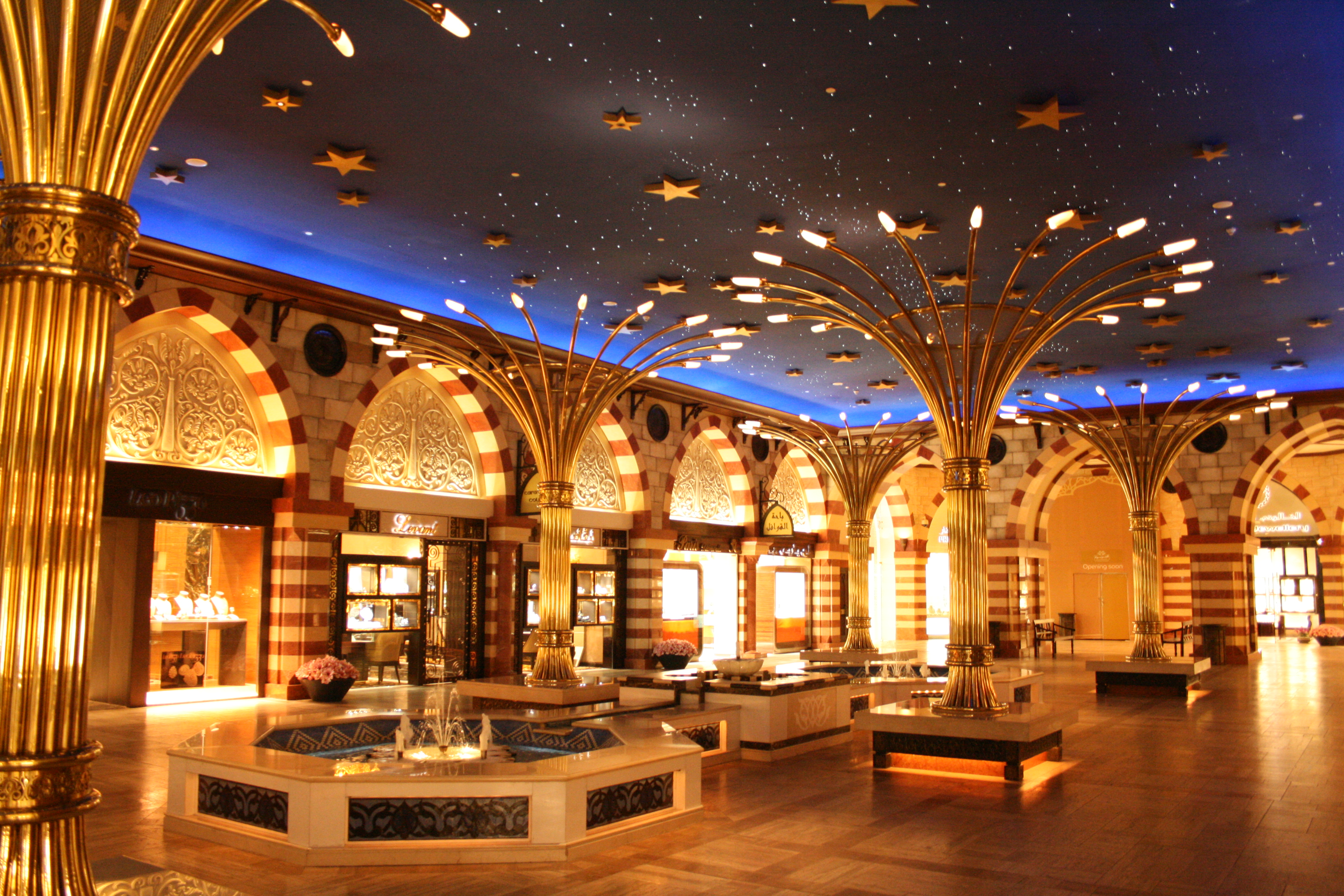
The Dubai Mall's Gold Souk

- Arabian Center
- BurJuman
- City Center Me'aisem
- City Centre Deira
- City Centre Mirdif
- Dragon Mart
- Dubai Festival City
- Dubai Marina Mall
- Dubai Outlet Mall
- Ibn Battuta Mall
- Mall of Arabia (Dubai)
- Mall of the Emirates
- Mall of the World
- Mercato Shopping Mall
- Mohammed bin Rashid City
- The Dubai Mall
- Wafi City
- The Walk (Jumeirah Beach Residence)

=== Skyscrapers ===
- Arenco Tower
- The Address
- The Address Boulevard
- AG Tower
- Al Attar Business Tower
- Al Hekma Tower
- Al Salam Tecom Tower
- Al Yaqoub Tower
- Almas Tower
- Anara Tower
- Armada Towers
- Bay Central
- Boulevard Plaza
- Rosewood Dubai
- Burj Al Arab
- Burj Al Salam
- Burj Jumeirah
- Burj Khalifa
- Burj Vista
- Burj 2020
- Business Central Towers (two high-rise buildings)
- Chelsea Tower
- Concorde Tower
- Conrad Dubai
- Downtown Dubai
- Dream Tower, Dubai
- Dubai Marriott Harbour Hotel & Suites
- Dubai Meydan City
- Dubai Mixed-Use Towers
- Dubai One Tower
- Dubai Pearl
- Dubai Towers Dubai
- Dubai World Trade Centre
- Duja Tower
- Dusit Thani Hotel
- Emirates Office Tower
- Emirates Towers
- Entisar Tower
- Executive Towers
- Fortune Araames
- Four Points by Sheraton
- Gevora Hotel
- The Grand Boulevard Tower
- HHHR Tower
- The Index (Dubai)
- Iris Bay (Dubai)
- IRIS Mist
- Jumeirah Al Khor
- Jumeirah Bay
- Jumeirah Beach Residence (40 high-rise buildings)
- Jumeirah Business Center 1
- Jumeirah Business Center Towers
- JW Marriott Marquis Dubai
- Khalid Al Attar Tower 2
- Lake Shore Towers
- Lighthouse Tower
- LIWA Heights
- Marina 106
- Marina Promenade
- MarinaScape
- Mazaya Business Avenue
- Meraas Tower
- Nakheel Tower
- National Bank of Dubai (building)
- O-14 (Dubai)
- O2 Residence
- The Oberoi Business Bay
- The One Tower
- Orra Marina
- The Palladium (Dubai)
- The Palm Tower
- Park Lane Tower (Dubai)
- Park Place (Dubai)
- Pentominium
- The Residences
- Rolex Tower
- Rose Rayhaan by Rotana
- Saba Tower 1
- Saba Tower 4
- Shangri-La Hotel (Dubai)
- The Sheffield Tower
- Signature Towers
- Sky Gardens
- Starhill Tower
- Tiara United Towers
- The Tower (Dubai)
- The Tower at Dubai Creek Harbour
- Vision Tower
- Vue De Lac
- World Trade Centre Residence

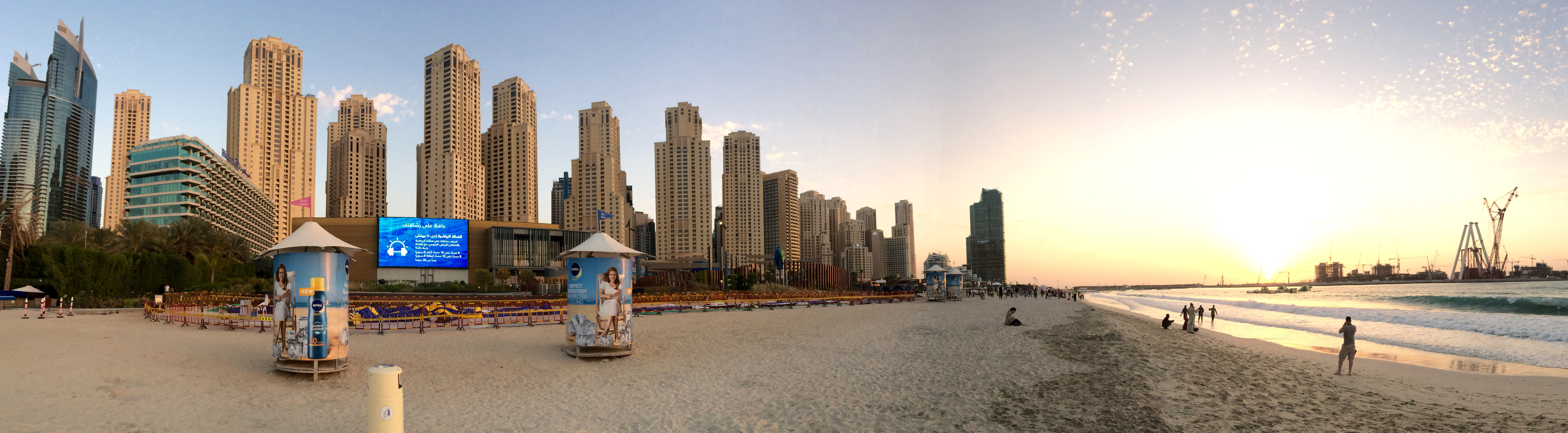
The Jumeirah Beach Residence is a residential development that has 40 towers, with 35 as residential and 5 as hotels.

==== Skyscraper hotels ====
Burj Al Arab

- Angsana Hotel & Suites
- Atlantis, The Palm
- Burj Al Arab
- Burj Khalifa
- Ciel Tower
- Emirates Towers
- Four Points by Sheraton Sheikh Zayed Road Dubai
- Gevora Hotel
- Grosvenor House (Dubai)
- Jumeirah Emirates Towers Hotel
- JW Marriott Marquis Dubai
- Marina 101
- Paramount Tower Hotel & Residences
- Rose Rayhaan by Rotana
- Shangri-La Hotel (Dubai)
- Tamani Hotel Marina
- Trump International Hotel & Tower (Dubai)

==== Residential skyscrapers ====
- 21st Century Tower
- 23 Marina
- The Address Downtown Dubai
- Al Fattan Marine Towers
- Al Rostamani Maze Tower
- Al Seef Towers
- Al Tayer Tower
- Angsana Hotel & Suites
- Burj Khalifa
- Cayan Tower
- Central Park Towers
- D1 (building)
- DAMAC Residenze
- DAMAC Maison-Paramount Tower 1
- DAMAC Maison-Paramount Tower 2
- DAMAC Maison-Paramount Tower 3
- DAMAC Paramount Hotel & Residences
- Dubai One Tower
- Elite Residence
- Elite Towers
- Emirates Crown
- Grosvenor House (Dubai)
- Marina 1
- Marina 101
- Marina Pinnacle
- The Marina Torch
- Millennium Tower (Dubai)
- Moving skyscraper
- Ocean Heights (Dubai)
- Pentominium
- Princess Tower
- Sama Tower
- Sulafa Tower
- Tamani Hotel Marina
- The Tower at Dubai Creek Harbour
- Ubora Towers

=== Sports venues ===
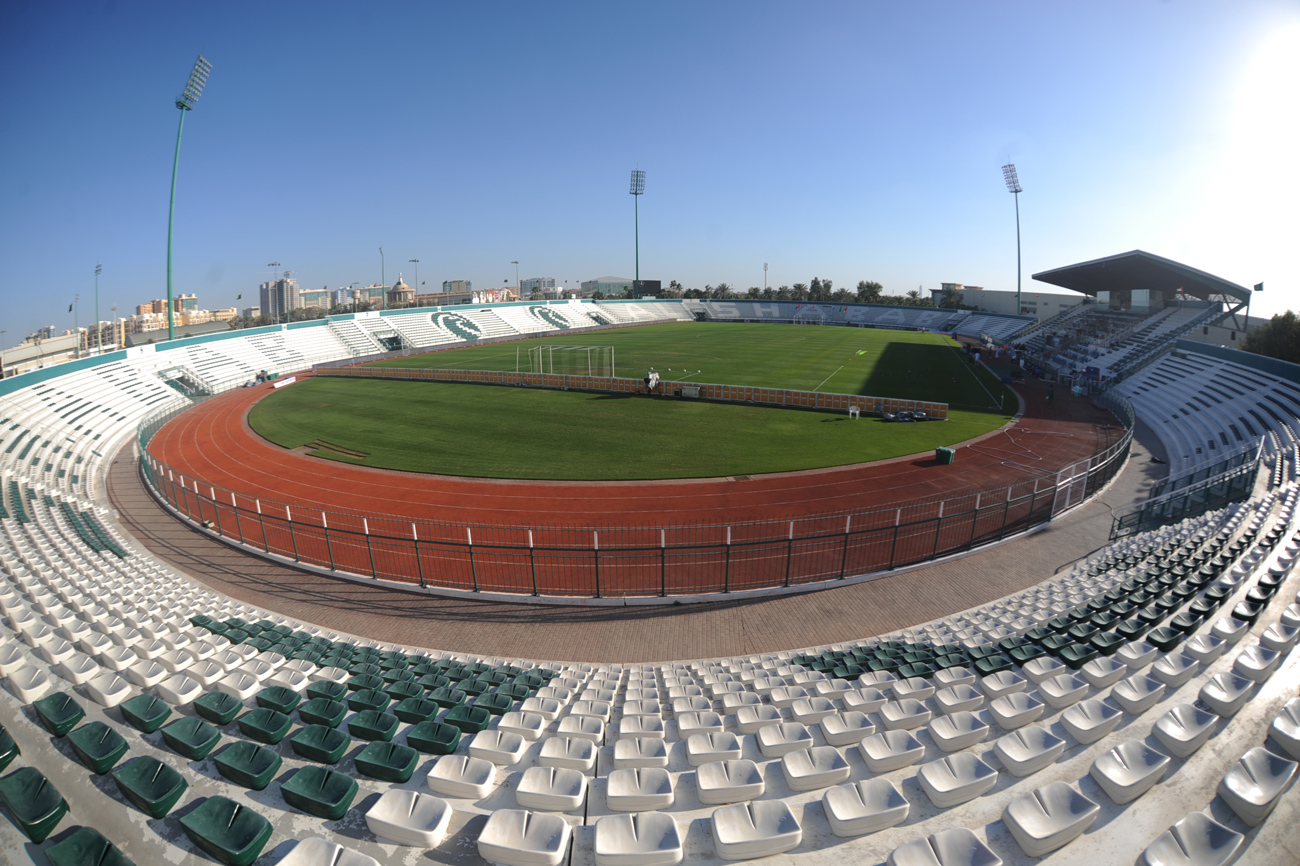
The Maktoum Bin Rashid Al Maktoum Stadium

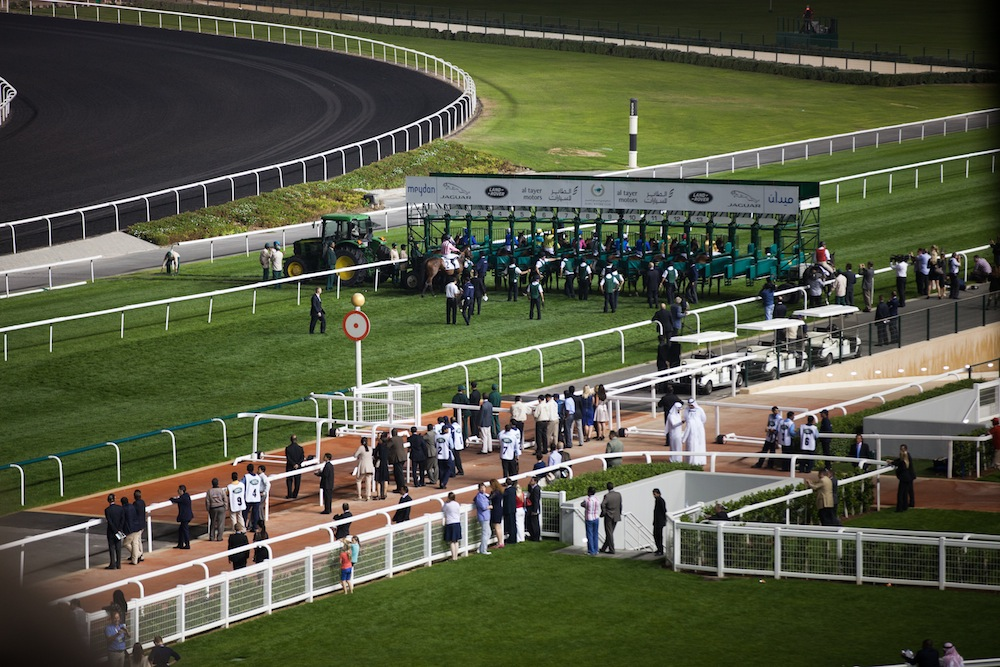
Meydan Racecourse

- Aviation Club Tennis Centre
- DSC Hockey Stadium
- DSC Indoor Arena
- DSC Multi-Purpose Stadium
- Dubai Autodrome
- Dubai Cricket Council Ground No 1
- Dubai Cricket Council Ground No 2
- Dubai International Cricket Stadium
- Emirates Golf Club
- Hamdan Sports Complex
- ICC Academy Ground
- Iranian Club, Dubai
- Jumeirah Golf Estates
- List of sports venues in Dubai
- Al-Maktoum Stadium
- Maktoum Bin Rashid Al Maktoum Stadium
- Meydan Racecourse
- Police Officers' Club Stadium
- Al-Rashid Stadium
- The Sevens Stadium
- Zabeel Stadium

==== Dubai Sports City ====
- Dubai Sports City
  - DSC Hockey Stadium
  - DSC Indoor Arena
  - Dubai Cricket Council Ground No 1
  - Dubai International Cricket Stadium
  - ICC Academy
  - MacTech Pro
  - ICC Academy Ground

== Buildings under construction ==
- Ain Dubai
- Al Habtoor City
- Al Hekma Tower
- Al Maktoum International Airport
- Arabian Canal
- Bay Central
- Bayside Residence
- Bluewaters Island
- Rosewood Dubai
- Burj Al Salam
- DAMAC Maison-Paramount Tower 1
- DAMAC Maison-Paramount Tower 2
- DAMAC Maison-Paramount Tower 3
- DAMAC Paramount Hotel & Residences
- Downtown Dubai
- Dubai Central Library
- Dubai Industrial Park
- Dubai Maritime City
- Dubai Meydan City
- Dubai Outlet City
- Dubai TechnoPark
- Dubai Waterfront
- Duja Tower
- Elite Towers
- Emirates Financial Towers
- F1-X Dubai
- IMG Worlds of Adventure
- Iris Bay (Dubai)
- Jumeirah Al Khor
- Jumeirah Garden City
- Marina 101
- Marina 106
- Mazaya Business Avenue
- Mohammad bin Rashid Gardens
- Nakheel Mall
- O2 Residence
- The Oberoi Business Bay
- OQYANA World First
- Orra Marina
- Palm Islands
- Palm Jebel Ali
- Park Lane Tower (Dubai)
- Pentominium
- [[MacBook Repair Dubai]]

== Proposed buildings ==
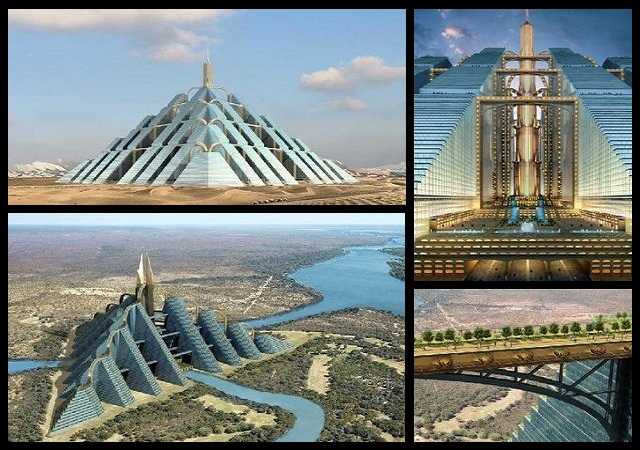
The proposed Ziggurat Pyramid

- Anara Tower
- Bawadi
- Burj Al Fattan
- Burj al-Taqa
- Burj Park III
- Culture Village
- DAMAC Residenze
- Deira Island
- Dubai Central Library
- Dubai Food City
- Dubai Golf City
- Elite Towers
- Entisar Tower
- Falconcity of Wonders
- The Grand Boulevard Tower
- Hydropolis
- Jebel Ali Seaplane Base
- Jumeirah Business Center 1
- Jumeirah Business Center Towers
- Mall of Arabia (Dubai)
- Paramount theme park Dubai
- Pentominium
- Saadiyat Island
- The Sheffield Tower
- Signature Towers
- The World (archipelago)
- Ziggurat Pyramid, Dubai – a pyramid-shaped arcology that was conceived for Dubai in 2008. It was estimated to start construction in 2021, and It will be completed by 2028.

== Cancelled buildings ==
- Burj Al Alam
- Dubai Pearl
- Lighthouse Tower
- Nakheel Tower
- Trump International Hotel and Tower (Dubai)

== Miscellaneous ==
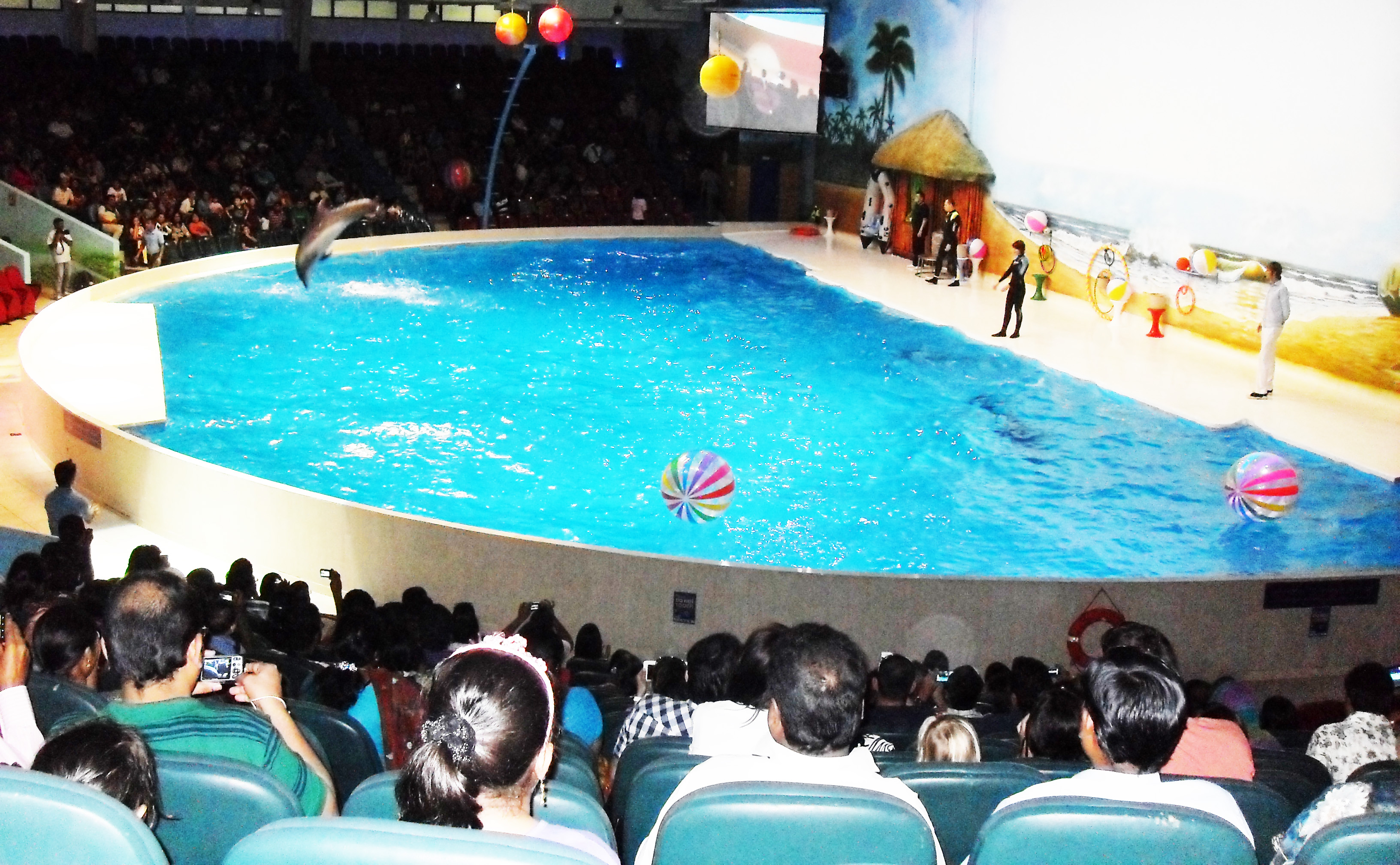
A dolphin show at the Dubai Dolphinarium

- Al Sahab Tower 2 – a 44-floor residential tower comprising part of the Al Sahab Towers complex in the Dubai Marina in Dubai. Construction of the Al Sahab Tower 2 was completed in 2004.
- B2B Tower – a 20-floor tower in the Business Bay in Dubai, United Arab Emirates.
- Dubai Chamber of Commerce and Industry (building)
- Deira Clocktower
- MacBoo
- Desert Gate Towers- twin towers that would have flanked the entrance to the Bawadi district of Dubailand
- Dubai Creek Tower
- Dubai Dolphinarium
- Dubai Drydocks
- Dubai International City – a country-themed architecture of residences, business, and tourist attractions, spreading over an area of 800 hectares (8 million square meters).
- Dubai International Convention Centre
- Dubai International Financial Centre
- Dubai Internet City
- Dubai Sports City
- Dubai Knowledge Village
- Dubai Opera
- Dubai Science Park
- Dubai Silicon Oasis
- Emirates Institute for Banking and Financial Studies
- Hatta Heritage Village
- Heritage Village Dubai
- Hindu Temple, Dubai
- Jumeirah Lake Towers
- Majlis Ghorfat Umm Al Sheif – a preserved building built in 1955 that was the home of Sheikh Rashid bin Saeed Al Maktoum, where he used to spend afternoons during summer
- Marina Quays
- Markaz, Dubai
- One Business Bay
- Ontario Tower – a 29-floor tower developed by Rose Homes Investments in the Business Bay in Dubai. Construction of the Ontario Tower was completed in 2011.
- The Regal Tower – a 33-floor tower developed by Tameer located in the Business Bay, Dubai. Construction of Regal Tower was completed in 2012.
- Sheikh Mohammed Centre for Cultural Understanding
- Tashkeel Dubai

== Gallery ==
Jumeirah Emirates Towers

Cayan Tower

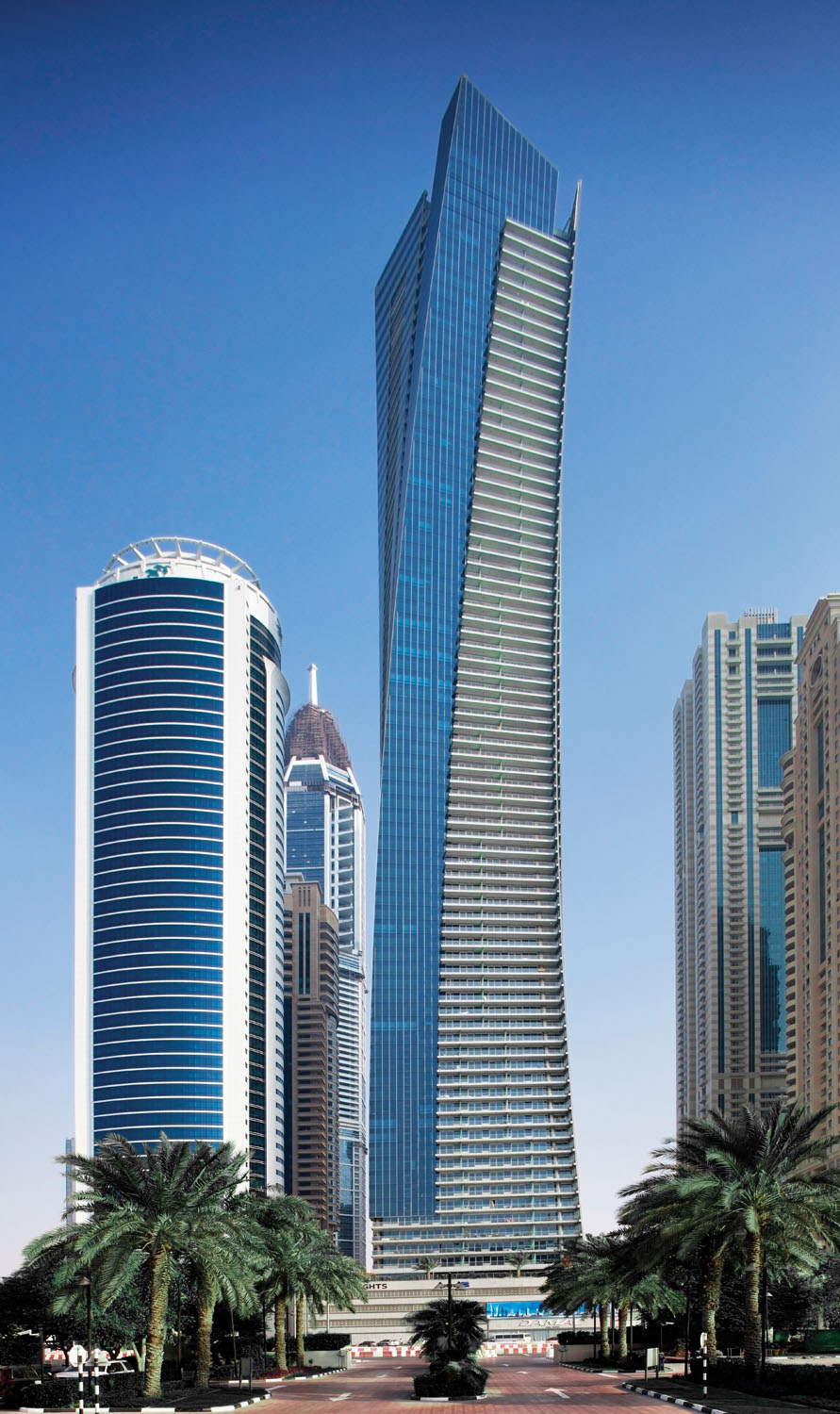
Ocean Heights
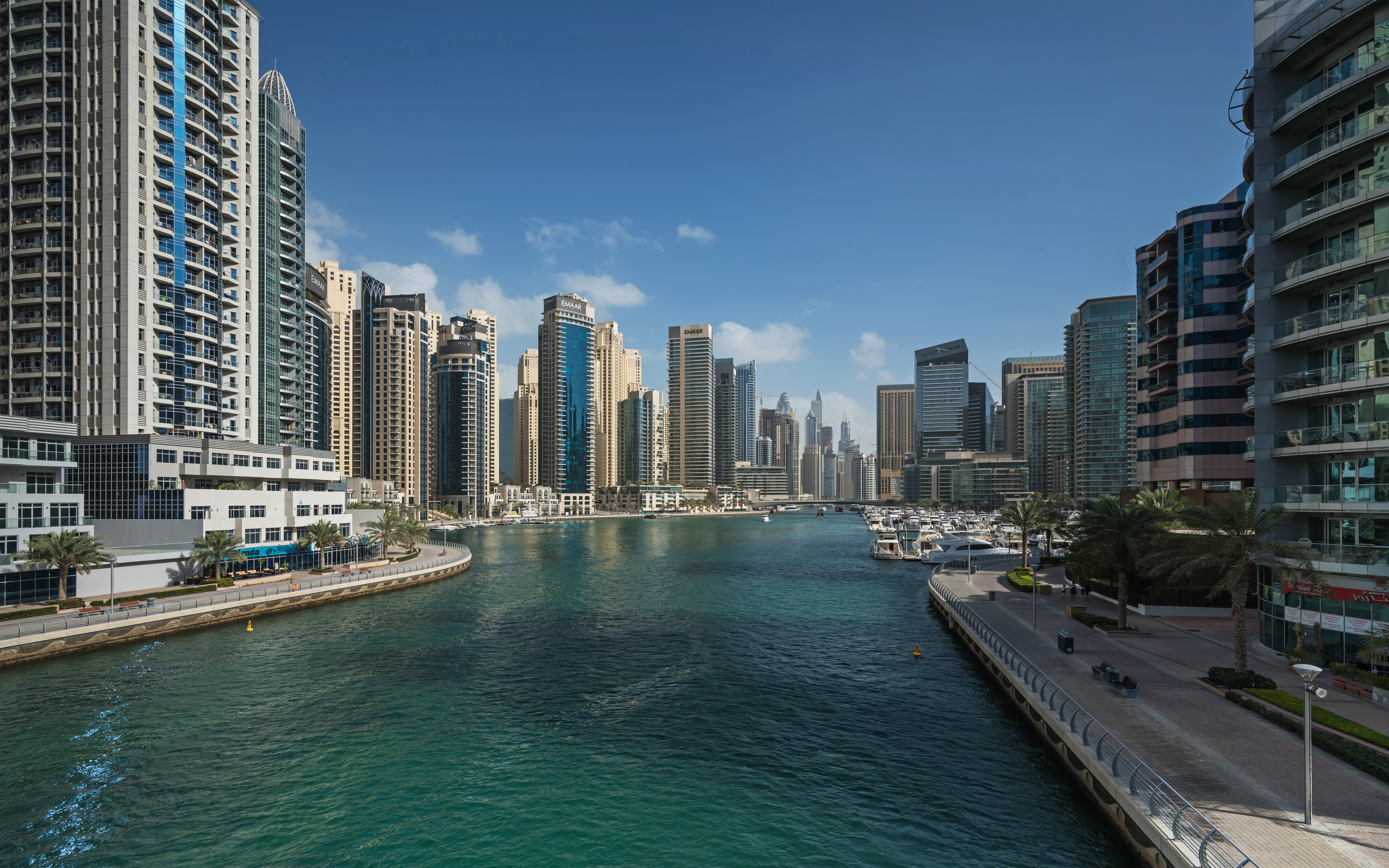
Buildings at the Dubai Marina District

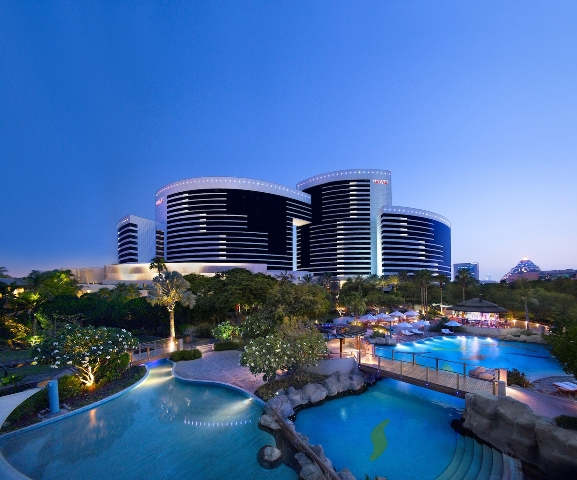
The Grand Hyatt Dubai

The Masjid Al Rahim mosque at the Dubai Marina

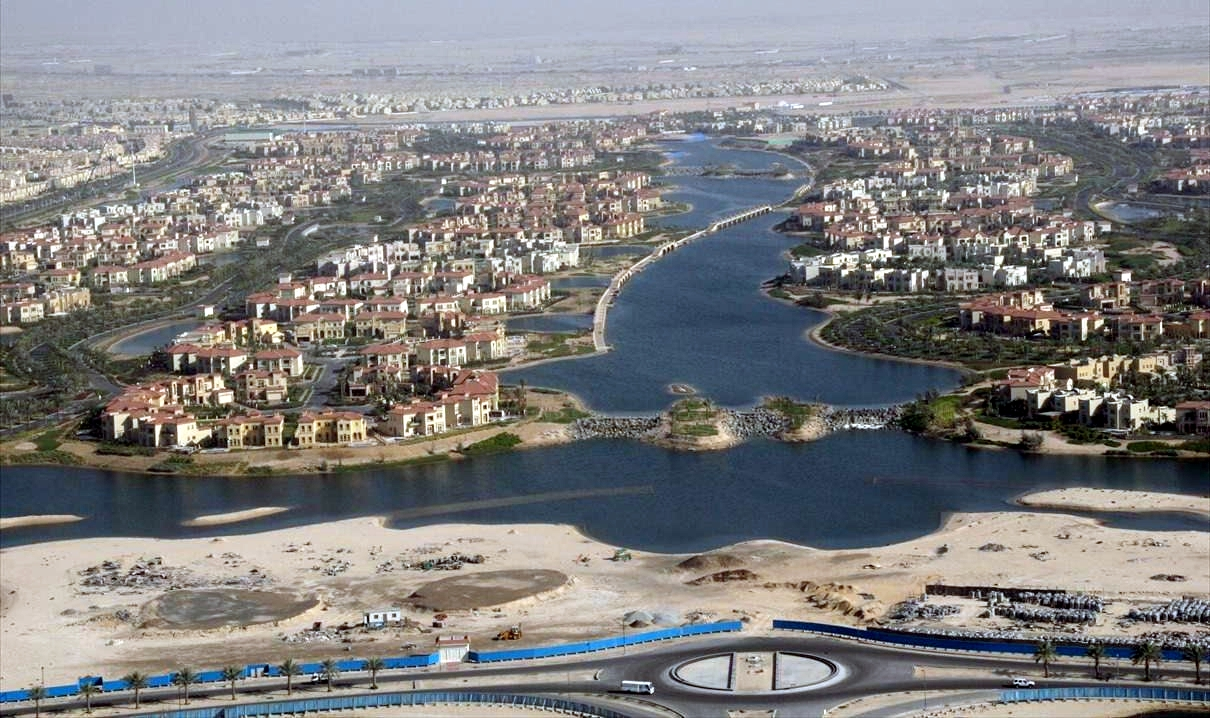
Jumeirah Islands

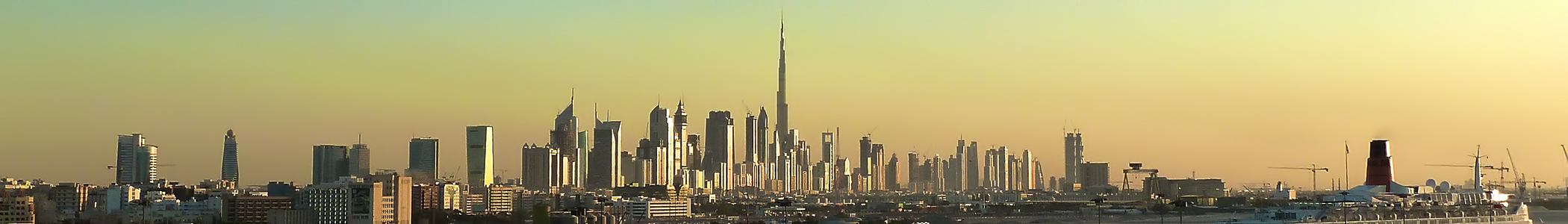
The Dubai skyline in June 2013

== See also ==
- Geography of Dubai
- List of real estate in Dubai
- List of tallest residential buildings in Dubai
- List of tallest buildings in the United Arab Emirates
- The Dubai Fountain – the world's largest choreographed fountain system
