= Shemara =

Shemara may refer to:

- MY Shemara, a 1938-built motor yacht
- Shemara Refit, a shipbuilding company on the Isle of Wight, United Kingdom
- Shemara Tower, one of the towers on Marina Promenade, Dubai
- Shemara Wikramanayake (born 1962), Australian executive
