= DSDM =

DSDM may refer to:

- Dubai School of Dental Medicine
- Dynamic systems development method, an agile project delivery framework
