= Park Lane Tower =

- Interactive map of the Park Lane Tower area

General information
- Type: Mixed-use
- Location: Dubai, United Arab Emirates
- Coordinates: 25.18523°N 55.26189°E
- Construction started: 2007
- Opening: 2016

Technical details
- Floor count: 37
- Lifts/elevators: 12

Design and construction
- Architect: Carlos Ott Architect
- Developer: Dubai Properties

The Park Lane Tower is a mixed-use 37-floor tower in the Business Bay district of Dubai, United Arab Emirates. Construction of the Park Lane Tower began in 2007 and was completed in 2016. The tower contains both commercial space and a hotel, beginning on the 19th floor. The hotel has 200 rooms, two pools, restaurants and separate spas for men and women.

== See also ==
- List of buildings in Dubai
- List of tallest buildings in Dubai
