= Iris Bay (Dubai) =

- Interactive map of the Iris Bay area

General information
- Status: Open/Active
- Type: Office building
- Location: Dubai, United Arab Emirates
- Coordinates: 25°11′14.16″N 55°15′36.76″E
- Estimated completion: 2016

Technical details
- Floor count: 36

Design and construction
- Architect: WS Atkins & Partners
- Developer: Sheth Estate International Ltd

The Iris Bay is a 32-floor commercial tower in the Business Bay in Dubai, United Arab Emirates that is known for "its oval, crescent moon type shape." The tower has a total structural height of 170 m (558 ft). Construction of the Iris Bay was expected to be completed in 2008 but progress stopped in 2011. The building was completed 2015.

Dubai - Iris Bay

The tower is designed in the shape of an ovoid and comprises two identical double curved pixelated shells which are rotated and cantilevered over the podium. The rear elevation is a continuous vertical curve punctuated by balconies while the front elevation is made up of seven zones of rotated glass. The podium comprises 4 stories with a double height ground level and houses retail and commercial space totaling 36,000 m2.

== See also ==
- List of buildings in Dubai
