= Majlis Ghorfat Umm Al Sheif =

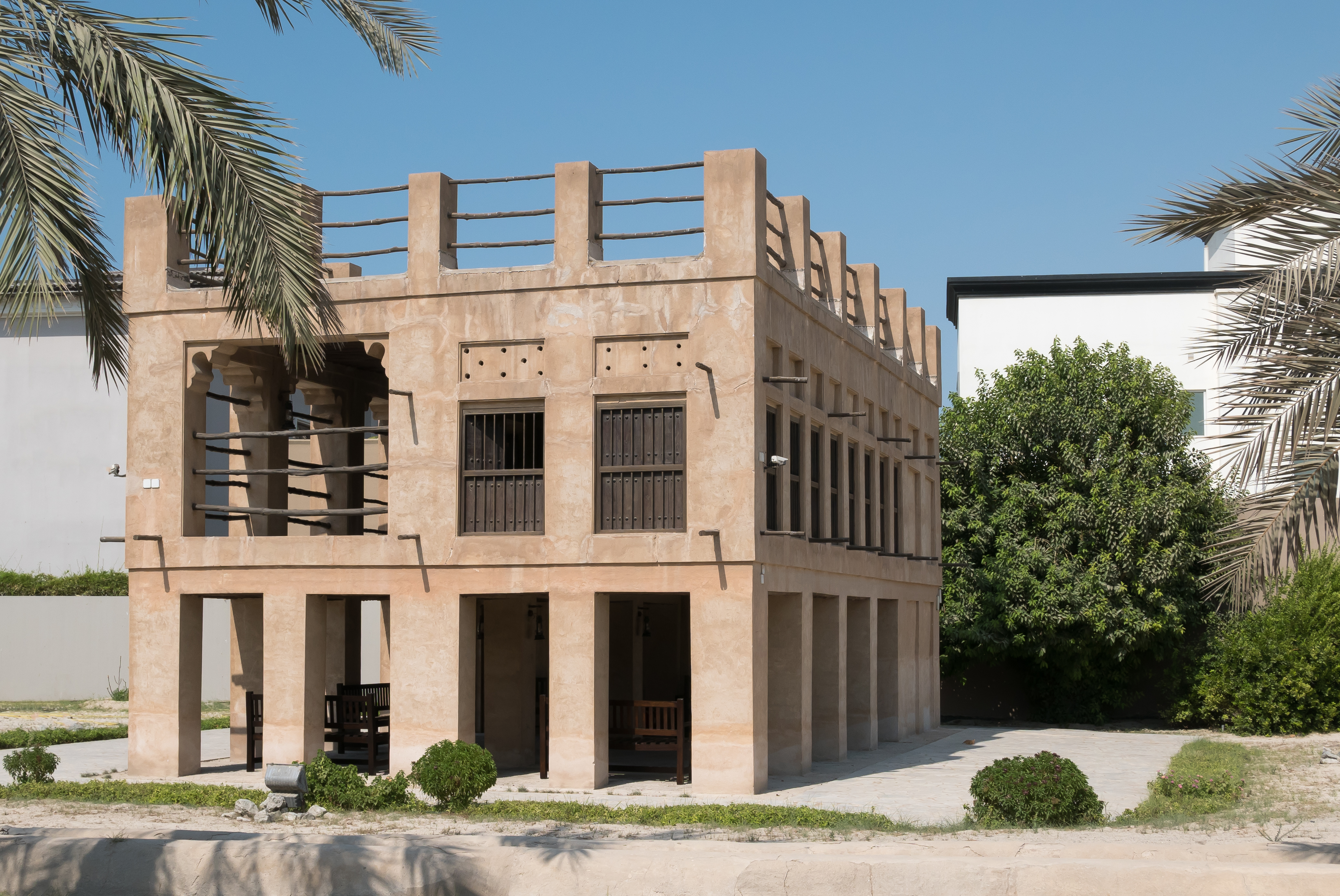
The Majlis Ghorfat Umm Al Sheif in Jumeirah 2, Dubai.

The Majlis Ghorfat Umm Al Sheif is the preserved summerhouse, or majlis, of the former Ruler of Dubai, Sheikh Rashid bin Saeed Al Maktoum. Located in the Dubai suburb of Jumeirah 2, the majlis is preserved today as a heritage site.

Constructed in 1955, the majlis was named after a pearl fishery of the same name. The majlis was at the time located far from the town of Dubai, in a date palm plantation near to a fishing village. It was built from a mixture of adobe, gypsum and coral with timber. The roof terrace of the majlis was used to both dry dates and provide a cool open air sleeping platform. The majlis was fully restored in 1994.

The restoration of the majlis included the construction of a small garden with date palms and a traditional aflaj irrigation system. It is now managed by Dubai Culture & Arts Authority and is a small but popular tourist destination.

== See also ==
- List of buildings in Dubai
