= MarinaScape =

Residential building in Dubai, UAE

- Interactive map of the MarinaScape area

General information
- Type: Residential
- Location: Dubai, United Arab Emirates
- Coordinates: 25°04′59″N 55°08′49″E
- Completed: 2008

Height
- Roof: Oceanic Tower - 132 metres (433 ft); Avant Tower - 104 metres (341 ft)

Technical details
- Floor count: Oceanic Tower 1 - 34; Avant Tower 2 - 26

Design and construction
- Architect: Archon Consultants
- Developer: Trident International Holdings

MarinaScape is a complex of two residential towers in Dubai Marina in Dubai, United Arab Emirates. Oceanic Tower consists of 34 stories and has a total structural height of 132 m (430 ft). The shorter tower, Avant Tower, consists of 26 stories at a height of 104 m (340 ft).

The complex was developed by Trident International Holdings. Construction commenced in 2004 and was completed in 2008. The towers were handed over to owners in December 2008.

The complex facilities include a covered parking lot, a play area, a barbecue area, a swimming pool, a sauna, a Jacuzzi, a steam room, and a gymnasium.

== See also ==
- List of buildings in Dubai
