= Dream Tower, Dubai =

Dream Tower, Dubai, Towers 1 and 2
- Interactive map of the Dream Tower, Dubai, Towers 1 and 2 area

General information
- Status: Completed
- Type: Residential
- Location: Dubai Marina, Dubai
- Coordinates: 25.07031°N 55.13606°E
- Estimated completion: 2009
- Opening: 2010

Height
- Roof: 174 m (571 ft)

Technical details
- Floor count: 29

Design and construction
- Architect: National Engineering Bureau
- Developer: Emirates Islamic Bank; EMAAR Properties; Dimensions Engineering Consultants; Desert Dream Real Estate and Investments

Dream Tower is a residential building in Dubai Marina district of Dubai, United Arab Emirates. The 29-storey residential tower is being built across 67,580 sq ft (6,278 m^{2}) of land space with total covering area of 750,000 sq ft (70,000 m^{2}), excluding car parking space.

== See also ==
- List of buildings in Dubai
