= Marina 1 =

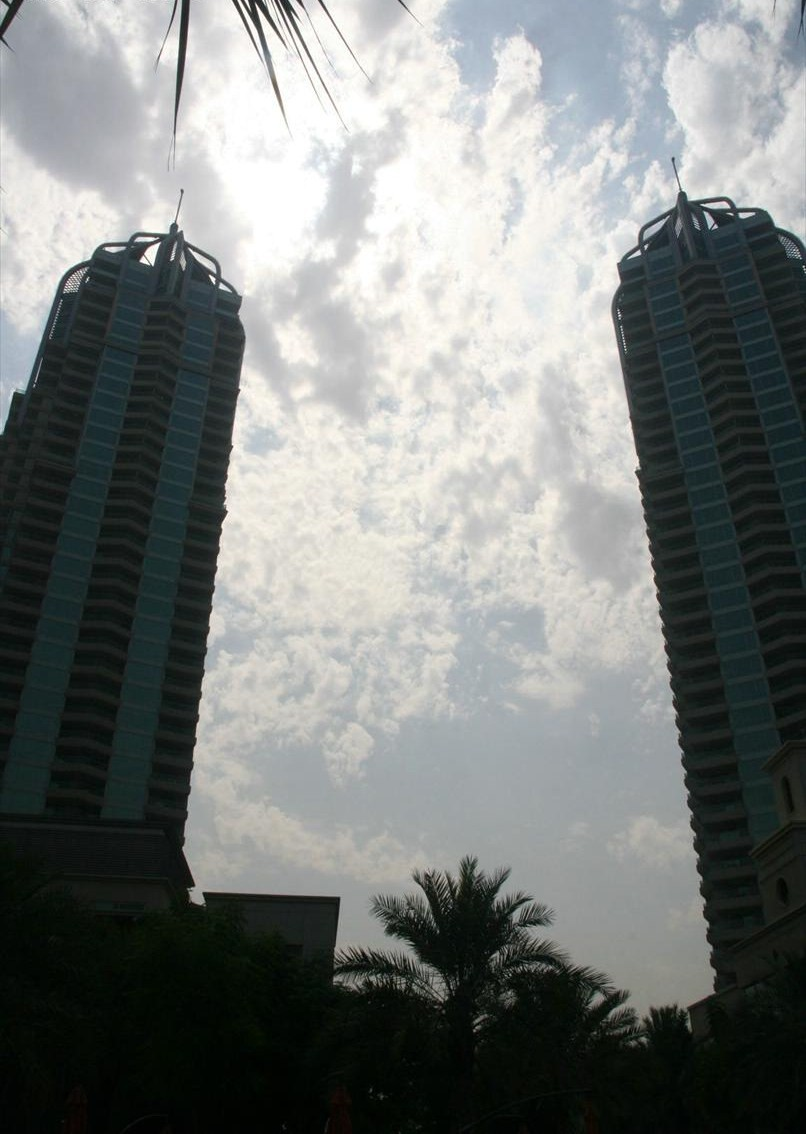
- Marina 1 as seen in June 2007
- Interactive map of the Marina 1 area

General information
- Type: Residential
- Location: Dubai, United Arab Emirates
- Coordinates: 25.085°N 55.149°E
- Construction started: 2001
- Completed: 2003

Design and construction
- Architect: Hellmuth, Obata and Kassabaum
- Developer: Emaar Properties

Marina 1 is a cluster of six residential buildings in Dubai Marina in Dubai, United Arab Emirates. Marina 1 was the first phase, and first completed buildings, in Dubai Marina. Because of that, these buildings have become a symbol for Dubai Marina. The complex contains 1100 units, which were all sold out shortly after going on sale in 2002.

== Towers ==
The complex consists of six buildings:

Rank	Name	Height* metres / ft	Floors	Notes
1=	Mesk Tower	185 / 607	40	
1=	Murjan Tower	185 / 607	40	
3	Al Mass Tower	138 / 453	31	
4	Yass Tower	124 / 407	27	
5	Fairooz Tower	98 / 322	23	
6	Anbar Tower	85 / 279	19	

== See also ==
- List of tallest buildings in Dubai
- List of buildings in Dubai
