= The Oberoi Business Bay =

Coordinates: 25.1832°N 55.2729°E

The Oberoi, Dubai
- Interactive map of the The Oberoi, Dubai area

General information
- Type: Hotel and Office Tower
- Location: Dubai, United Arab Emirates

Technical details
- Floor count: 30

Design and construction
- Architect: DSA
- Developer: Rani International

The Oberoi, Dubai is a five star luxury hotel in Business Bay, Dubai, United Arab Emirates.

It is a project of The Oberoi Group.

== See also ==
- List of buildings in Dubai
