= Jumeirah Al Khor =

Jumeirah Creekside Park

General information
- Status: Completed
- Type: Residential and Hotel
- Location: Dubai Healthcare City, Dubai, United Arab Emirates
- Coordinates: 25°13′56.74″N 55°19′29.35″E

Technical details
- Floor count: Residential tower - 43; Hotel tower - 35

Design and construction
- Architect: RMJM Dubai
- Developer: Jumeirah

Jumeirah Creekside Park (also known as Jumeirah Al Khor) is a group of two towers located in Dubai Healthcare City in Dubai, United Arab Emirates. The development consists of the Jumeirah Creekside Park Residence and Jumeirah Creekside Park Hotel. Jumeirah Al Khor Residence is the taller of the two with 43 floors, standing at 172 metres (564 ft). The Jumeriah Creekside Park Hotel has a height of 140 metres (460 ft), with 35 floors.

The complex was completed featuring a distinctive three wing architectural layout designed by RMJM. While, the hotel tower features 439 rooms and suites, alongside 406 apartments in the residential tower.

The layout, designed by RMJM architects was built to optimize views toward Dubai Creek and the surrounding healthcare free zone. Notable architectural features integrated into the complex include a signature 25 meter glass bottom swimming pool projecting past the main entrance, alongside public spaces curated to house an extensive collection of contemporary Middle Eastern artwork.

Operating as a five star lifestyle destination, the hotel integrates modern hospitality with cultural and community initiatives. It features an active artist in residence program and houses a collection of over 480 contemporary Middle Eastern artworks throughout its public spaces. In 2024, the property received Certified Autism Center designation after implementing specialized accessibility training for staff.

== See also ==
- List of tallest buildings in Dubai
- List of buildings in Dubai
