= Starhill Tower =

Starhill Tower & Gallery

General information
- Status: Completed
- Type: Commercial
- Completed: 2010

Technical details
- Floor count: 31 and 35
- Floor area: 1,756,649 sq ft (163,198.0 m^{2})

Starhill Towers & Gallery in Dubai is a twin-tower waterfront development consisting of freehold offices, a 5-star hotel and a luxury shopping mall. The 31-storey office tower of the project offers freehold office spaces ranging from 934 to 1,645 sq ft (86.8 to 152.8 m^{2}).

This project was expected to be delivered by 2010 and was completed on schedule.

== See also ==
- List of buildings in Dubai
