= Orra Marina =

- Interactive map of the Orra Marina area

General information
- Type: Residential + Retail
- Location: Dubai Marina, Dubai, United Arab Emirates
- Coordinates: 25°04′14.8″N 55°07′59.2″E
- Construction started: 2008
- Completed: 2012

Technical details
- Floor count: 30
- Lifts/elevators: 30

Design and construction
- Developer: Orra International

Website
- https://orra.ae/

The Orra Marina is a 30-floor tower in the Dubai Marina in Dubai, United Arab Emirates. Construction of Orra Marina was completed in 2012. The development was undertaken by Orra International, a company known for its ventures in both real estate and jewelry. The owner of Orra Marina is generally attributed to Orra Real Estate, a division of Orra International, which is part of the larger Orra Group.

== Amenities ==
Amenities at the Orra Marina include a gymnasium, swimming pools, saunas, an activity court, gaming room facilities, a children’s play area, 24/7 concierge service, and an on-site health club.

== See also ==
- List of buildings in Dubai
