= One Business Bay =

Coordinates: 25°11′16.0″N 55°15′42.5″E

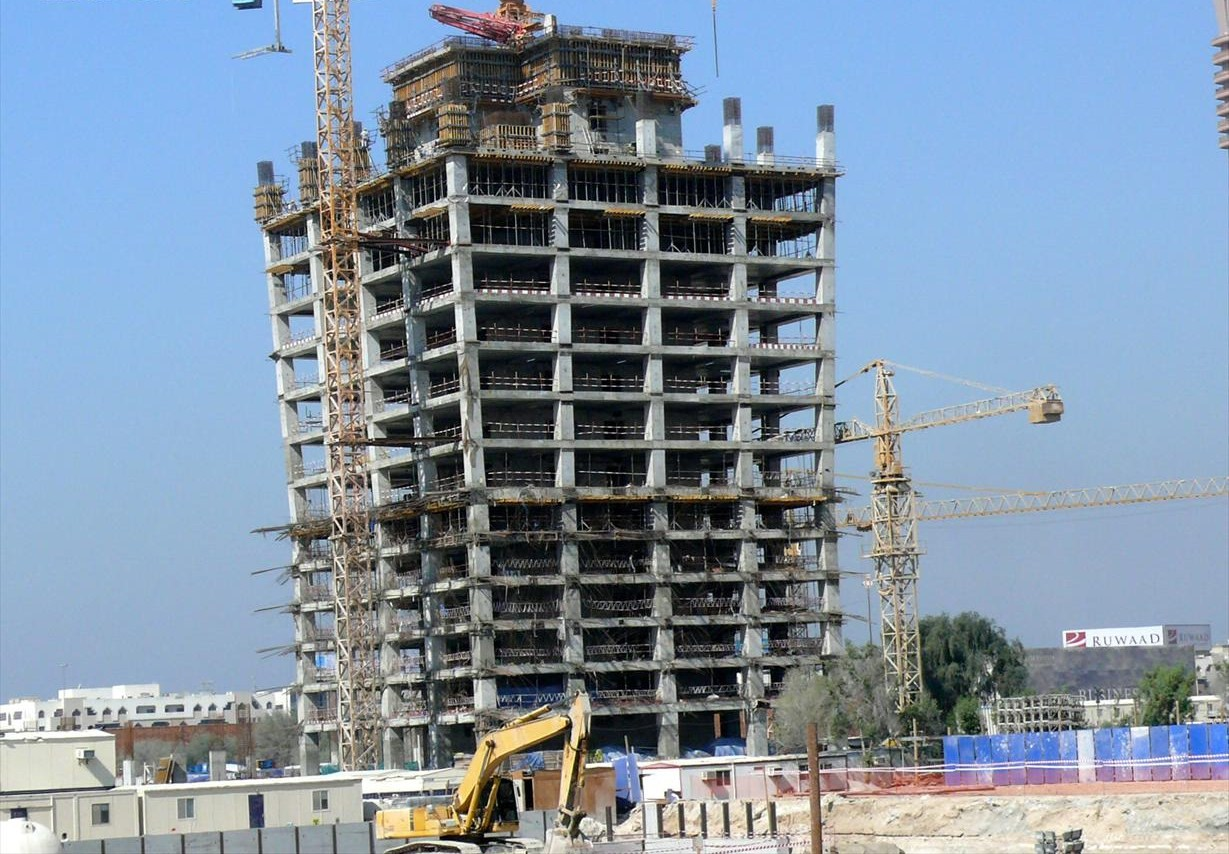
- One Business Bay under construction on 22 November 2007
- Interactive map of the One Business Bay area

General information
- Status: Completed
- Type: Office
- Location: Dubai, United Arab Emirates
- Construction started: 2006
- Completed: 2011

Height
- Roof: 527 feet

Technical details
- Floor count: 35

Design and construction
- Architect: Kling Consult GmbH
- Developer: Omniyat

One Business Bay, or ONE by OMNIYAT, is a 35-storey skyscraper developed and owned by Omniyat. It is located on plot 001 at the northern Sheikh Zayed Road entrance of Business Bay, Dubai, United Arab Emirates. The building was designed by the German architectural consultancy Kling Consult GmbH. The tower has 1000 car park spaces spread among 3 basement floors and a five-floor podium.

Each floor is larger than the previous, leading to its tapered form. Its 1st floor measures 774 m² and its 30th floor is 1,420 m².

It was completed in 2011.

== See also ==
- List of buildings in Dubai
