= Dusit Thani Dubai =

Hotel tower in Dubai, United Arab Emirates

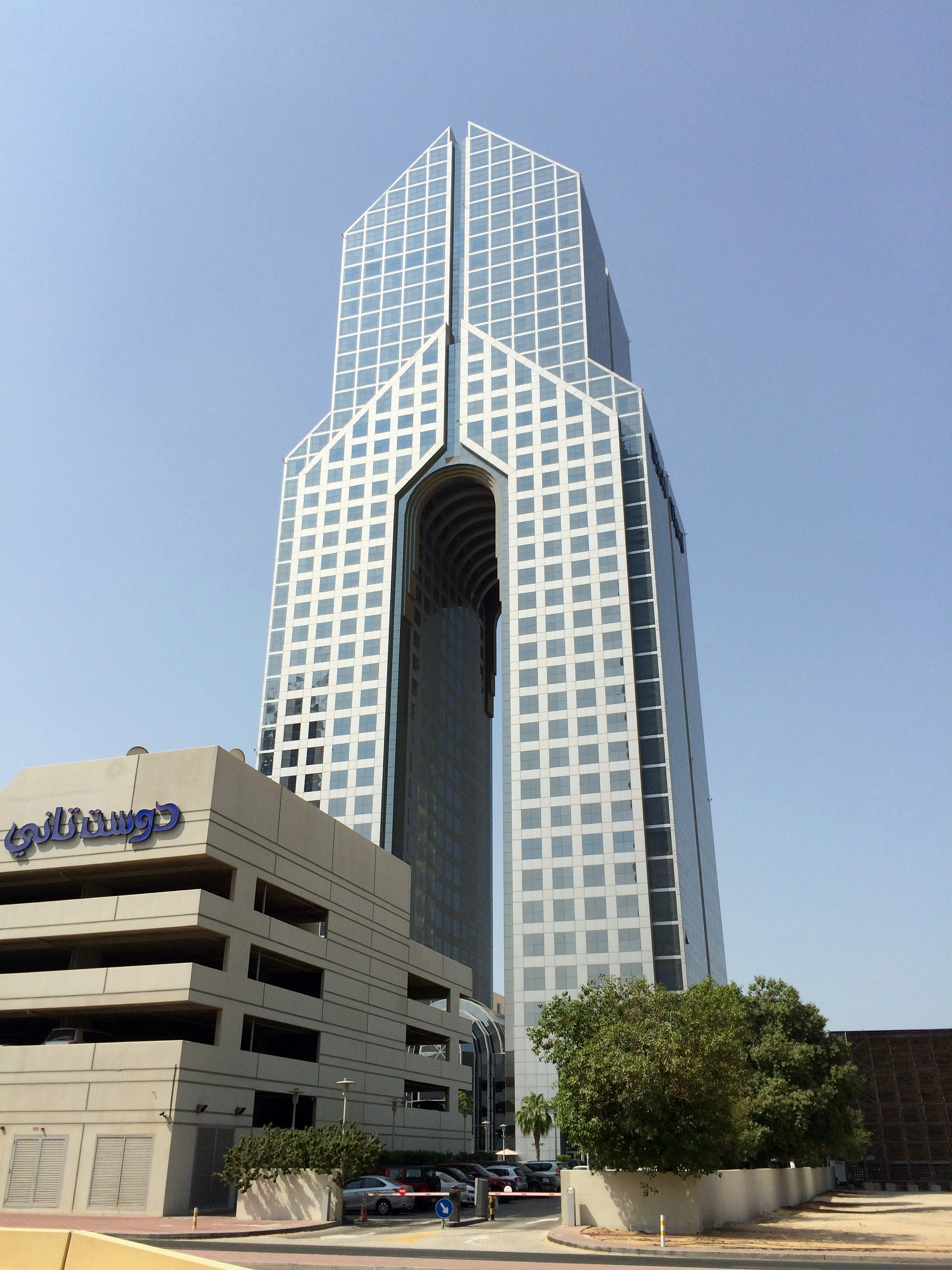
- Dusit Thani Dubai in 2015

- Location within United Arab Emirates

General information
- Type: Hotel
- Architectural style: Modern
- Location: 133 Sheikh Zayed Road, Dubai, United Arab Emirates
- Coordinates: 25°12′22″N 55°16′22″E
- Construction started: 1998
- Completed: 2001

Height
- Roof: 153 m (502 ft)

Technical details
- Floor count: 40
- Floor area: 60,300 m^{2} (649,000 sq ft)

Design and construction
- Architecture firm: Khatib and Alami
- Main contractor: Al Habtoor Engineering Enterprises

Other information
- Number of rooms: 174

Dusit Thani Dubai is a luxury hotel located in central Dubai, United Arab Emirates. It is situated close to major business districts, including the Dubai International Financial Centre (DIFC) and the Dubai World Trade Centre.

The hotel is also within a short distance of notable landmarks such as the Museum of the Future, the Dubai Mall, and the Burj Khalifa. Facilities include several international restaurants and event spaces, as well as wellness services.

== History ==
Dusit Thani Dubai in 2009

Construction of the Dusit Thani Dubai began in 1998 and was completed in 2001. Designed by the architecture firm Khatib and Alami and built by Al Habtoor, the 153-metre tower is notable for its large arch, which rises 282 feet and meets at the 24th floor.

In 2014, the hotel completed a major renovation of 147 suites. Further refurbishments included the redesign of the Benjarong restaurant, which reopened in 2021 following renovations.

In 2022, the property was repositioned as a dry hotel and introduced NoLo, the first non-alcoholic bar in Dubai.

In 2025, the hotel took part in World Alzheimer's Month by illuminating its façade in purple and hosting events to raise awareness about dementia care.

== See also ==
- List of tallest buildings in Dubai
- List of tallest buildings in the United Arab Emirates
- List of tallest residential buildings in Dubai
