= LIWA Heights =

Coordinates: 25°4′38″N 55°9′1″E

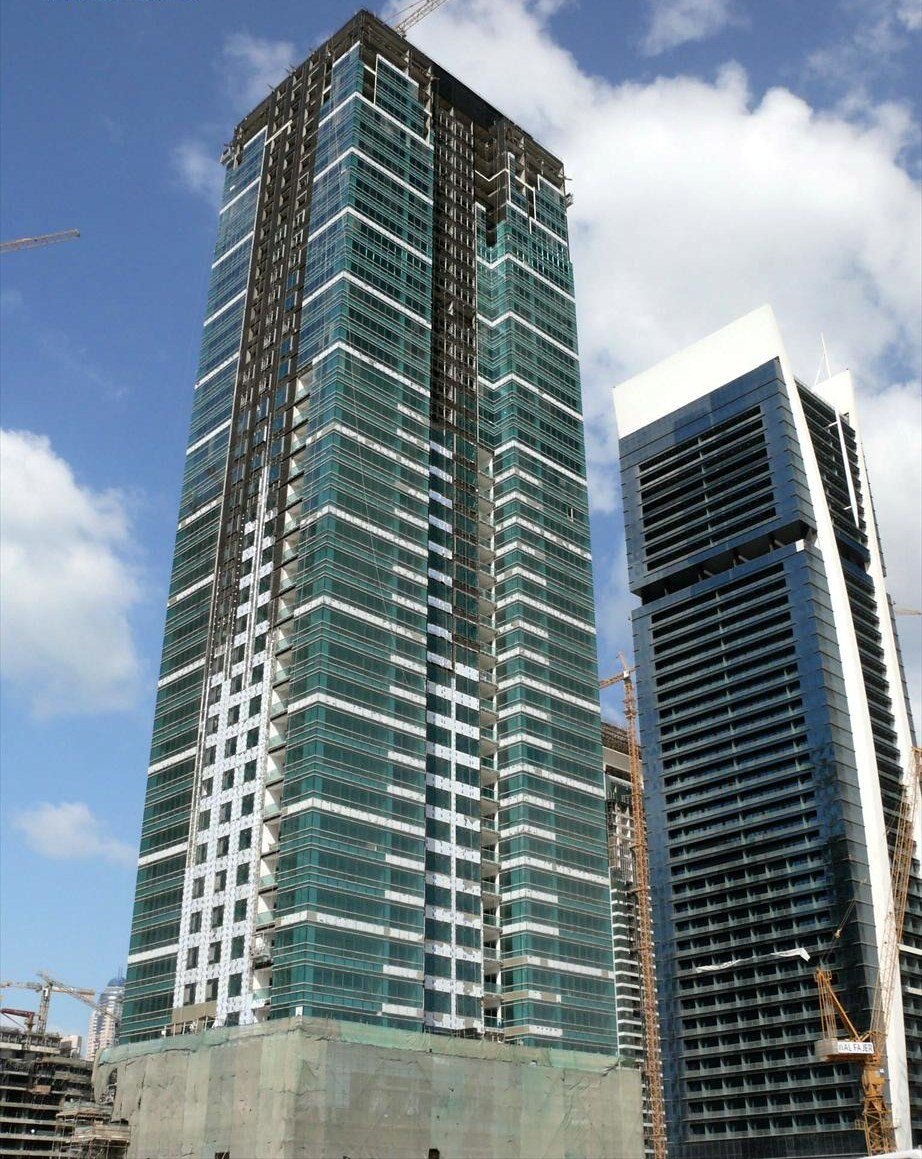
- LIWA Heights in January 2008
- Interactive map of the LIWA Heights area

General information
- Status: Completed
- Location: Dubai, United Arab Emirates
- Construction started: 2005
- Opening: 2008

Height
- Roof: 148 meters

Technical details
- Floor count: 41

Design and construction
- Architect: KEO International Consultants
- Developer: Nakheel Properties

The LIWA Heights is a 41-floor tower part of the Jumeirah Lake Towers in Dubai, United Arab Emirates. The tower has a total structural height of 148 m (486 ft). Construction of the LIWA Heights was completed in 2008.

== See also ==
- List of tallest buildings in Dubai
- List of buildings in Dubai
