= Anara Tower =

Cancelled building in Dubai

Coordinates: 25.1971°N 55.2741°E

- Interactive map of the Anara Tower area

General information
- Status: Cancelled
- Location: Sheikh Zayed Road, Dubai.
- Opening: TBD

Height
- Antenna spire: 655 m (2,149 ft)

Technical details
- Floor count: 135

Design and construction
- Architect: Atkins Design Studio
- Developer: Tameer Holding Investment

Anara Tower was a proposed supertall skyscraper in Dubai. It was slated to be one of Dubai's tallest buildings, and would have had 135 floors. It was designed to look like a massive wind turbine. It was supposed to be a mixed use tower with offices, retail spaces, apartments, and an art gallery. Anara Tower would have incorporated sky gardens every 27 floors and would have contained a luxury restaurant. If built it was expected to be an energy efficient tower by installing renewable sources of energy and incorporating water efficiency strategies.

== See also ==
- List of tallest buildings in Dubai
