= Burj Daman =

- Interactive map of the Burj Daman area

General information
- Type: Modern
- Location: Dubai, United Arab Emirates
- Coordinates: 25°12′39.30″N 55°16′55.95″E
- Construction started: 2006
- Estimated completion: 2013
- Opening: 2014

Height
- Roof: 235 m (771 ft)

Technical details
- Floor count: 65
- Lifts/elevators: 12

Design and construction
- Architects: Perkins & Will
- Developer: Arabtec & Al Rostamani Pegel (JV)

Burj Daman is a 65-floor tower in the Dubai International Financial Centre in Dubai, United Arab Emirates. The building is to have a total structural height of 235 m (771 ft). The building topped out in 2011, construction of Rosewood Dubai completed in 2014 and then rebranded to Waldorf Astoria Dubai International Financial Centre in June 2019. The building is now (March 2016) the 44th tallest in Dubai, and in 2024 it is the 82nd in Dubai.

== See also ==
- List of tallest buildings in Dubai
- List of tallest buildings in the United Arab Emirates
