= Ziggurat Pyramid, Dubai =

Pyramid-shaped arcology

Ziggurat Pyramid
- هرم الزقورة
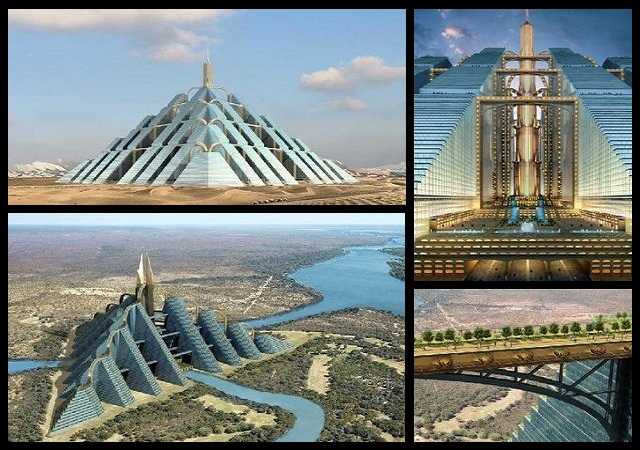
- Artist's rendition of the Ziggurat Pyramid

- Location within Dubai

General information
- Status: proposed project
- Type: Mixed-use
- Location: Dubai, United Arab Emirates
- Groundbreaking: 2022

Height
- Height: 1,200 m (3,900 ft)

Technical details
- Floor count: 300+
- Floor area: 2.3 Square kilometers (0.88 Square Miles)

Ziggurat Pyramid is a pyramid-shaped arcology that was conceived for Dubai in 2008. It was estimated to start construction in 2026 and be completed by 2032.

The structure was designed to house nearly one million people and would be self-sustainable with all-natural energy sources. Like the pyramids of the Mayans and Egyptians, this structure in Dubai would be a giant; it would cover 2.3 square kilometers (0.88 square miles) and would be able to sustain a community of up to one million people. The “Ziggurat” is named after the temple towers of the ancient Mesopotamian valley, a terraced pyramid structure with successively receding stories. It would be a carbon-neutral structure.

According to the International Institute for the Urban Environment, the technologies incorporated into the Ziggurat project would make it a viable metropolis. Timelinks has already patented the design and technology used in this project. The building would be green, powered by solar, wind and natural sources and capable of running completely off the grid, according to Timelinks, a Dubai-based pioneering environmental design company who is in charge of the building. The building would also boast an efficient public transportation system, which would run horizontally and vertically.

Ziggurat communities can be almost totally self-sufficient energy-wise. Apart from using steam power in the building we will also employ wind turbine technology to harness natural energy resources. Whole cities can be accommodated in complexes which take up less than 10% of the original land surface. Public and private landscaping will be used for leisure pursuits or irrigated as agricultural land.

— Timelinks, MD, Ridas Matonis

A horizontal and vertical integrated 360 degree network would be the mode of transportation in this city of the future, making cars redundant. Facial recognition technology for security purposes is another interesting feature that would be incorporated into the Ziggurat Project.

After the initial proposal in 2008, there was no further information.

== See also ==
- Shimizu Mega-City Pyramid
- The Line, Saudi Arabia
