= Arabian Center =

- أرابيان سنتر
- Location: Dubai, United Arab Emirates
- Coordinates: 25.235438°N 55.436022°E
- Address: Khawaneej Road, Al Mizhar, near Mirdif.
- Opened: 1 March 2009; 17 years ago
- Manager: Al-Futtaim Malls
- Num. of stores: 200
- Num. of anchor tenants: 2
- Floor area: 80,000 square metres (860,000 sq ft)
- Floors: 2
- Parking: 500+
- Public transit: Bus: F05, 11A
- Website: arabiancenter.com

Arabian Center (Arabic: أرابيان سنتر) is a shopping mall located on Khawaneej Road in Al Mizhar, near Mirdif, Dubai, United Arab Emirates. The mall opened on 1 March 2009 and is managed by Al-Futtaim Malls.

On 25 November 2013, Arabian Center received the Silver Award in the Middle East and North Africa Shopping Center Awards category at the ICSC Global Awards.
