= DAMAC Towers by Paramount Hotels & Resorts =

- Alternative names: Paramount Hotel Dubai

General information
- Status: Completed
- Construction started: 2013
- Completed: 2019

Height
- Roof: 270 m (886 ft)
- Top floor: 68

Technical details
- Floor count: 2

Design and construction
- Developer: DAMAC Properties

DAMAC Towers by Paramount Hotels & Resorts Dubai is a complex of four skyscrapers located in Business Bay, Dubai. The complex was first announced in 2016 and will be completed in 2020. Each of the four buildings will be 270 metres (890 ft) tall with 68 stories each.

The complex was launched by Paramount Hotels & Resorts partnered with DAMAC Properties on 12 March 2013. The Damac Towers project is Paramount Hotels & Resorts first venture into the hotel and real estate industry. Once completed, the whole complex will cost around US$1 billion.

A multi-level plaza linking the four buildings will contain themed bars and restaurants, event spaces, a screening room, fitness centres, swimming pools, a kids club, and a shop area with Paramount-branded goods. One tower will feature the Paramount Hotel and Residences while the other three will house the DAMAC Maison–Paramount co-branded serviced residences.

== Residential towers ==
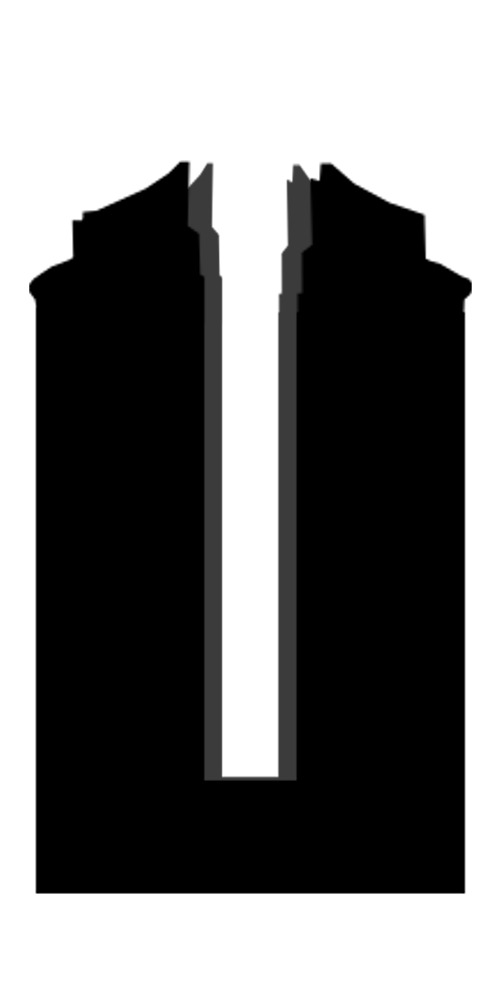
DAMAC Towers by Paramount

3 of the 4 buildings in the complex are residential buildings. There are 1,140 residential units in total in the 3 towers.

== Paramount Hotel Dubai ==
Paramount Hotel Dubai is a hotel in Dubai taking up one of the four towers in the DAMAC Towers by Paramount Hotels & Resort skyscraper complex. The hotel has eight types of rooms, scene rooms, stage rooms, premiere suites, silver screen suits, The Don Corleone suits, The Charleston suits, the Carole Suits, and Paramount suites. The suites are themed off of Paramount films such as The Godfather and The Great Gatsby. The hotel has 823 rooms, a 55 seater screening room, Flash back speakeasy bar and lounge that homes the renowned Paramount Hotel Murder Mystery Immersive theater, Pacific Groove surf and turf California grill, The Craft table artesian cafe, the Cheat chocolate lab and the Malibu pool deck and lounge around the resort style pool nestled between the four towers. Paramount Hotel also offers Pause fitness center and Spa. The hotel opened in November 2019.

== See also ==
- Paramount Tower Hotel & Residences
