= Paramount Tower Hotel & Residences =

Residential skyscrapers in Dubai

- Interactive map of the Paramount Tower Hotel & Residences area
- Alternative names: Paramount Hotel Midtown

General information
- Status: Completed
- Coordinates: 25.1933791°N 55.2653537°E
- Construction started: 2016
- Completed: 2021
- Opening: February 2022

Height
- Roof: 258 m (846 ft)
- Top floor: 66 Building top swimming pool

Design and construction
- Architects: LACASA Architects & Engineering Consultants
- Developer: DAMAC Properties
- Main contractor: CSCEC

Paramount Tower Hotel & Residences Dubai is a single 66-story mixed hotel and residential skyscraper located in Business Bay, United Arab Emirates. Construction began in 2016 and the contract was given to the China State Construction Engineering by DAMAC Properties.

== Building ==
=== Hotel ===
Floors 15 to 25 of the building are high-end hotels rooms inspired by Hollywood studios.

=== Residential ===
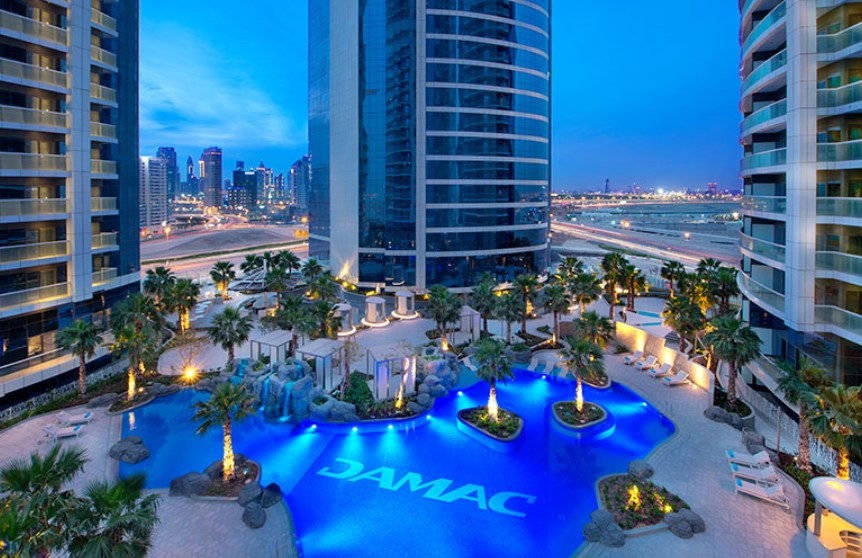
Paramount Towers

Floors 26 to 63 of the building are home to high-end residential units which feature "Paramount-standard" amenities and services.

== See also ==
- DAMAC Towers by Paramount Hotels & Resorts
