= Al Hekma Tower =

- Interactive map of the Al Hekma Tower area

General information
- Status: Completed
- Type: Office
- Location: Dubai, United Arab Emirates
- Coordinates: 25.199158587431697°N 55.26828299072191°E
- Construction started: 2006
- Estimated completion: 2016
- Opening: 2016

Height
- Roof: 283 metres (928 ft).

Technical details
- Floor count: 64 (2 floors below ground)

Design and construction
- Architect: Arex Engg. Consultants
- Developer: Shaikh Issa Bin Zayed Al Nahyan
- Main contractor: China State Construction Engineering

The Al Hekma Tower, measuring 283m (928 ft) in height, is the tallest building that CSCEC has built to date in the UAE, along Sheikh Zayed Road in Dubai, United Arab Emirates.

Al Hekma Tower literally translates into "The Wisdom Tower".

== History ==
The construction of the building is dedicated to the memory of Sheikh Zayed Bin Sultan Al Nahyan. A 50-meter photo of the defunct ruler was planned to be placed on top of the building.

Construction of the Al Hekma Tower started in 2006. It was kept on hold in 2009 but construction resumed in the summer of 2010. The project had been running smoothly until February 2012 when it was suddenly halted as Pearl Properties wanted to take a look at introducing some major design changes, including turning it into a hotel. The suspension lasted approximately 14 months. The tower had already topped out in July 2011 which was about 16 months after the core wall, columns and slabs were first erected at a rate of one level a week.

== Management ==
Sheikh Issa Bin Zayed Al Nahyan's holding company Pearl Properties manage the development of the building.

== See also ==
- List of tallest buildings in Dubai
- List of tallest buildings in the United Arab Emirates
