= Sheikh Obaid bin Thani House =

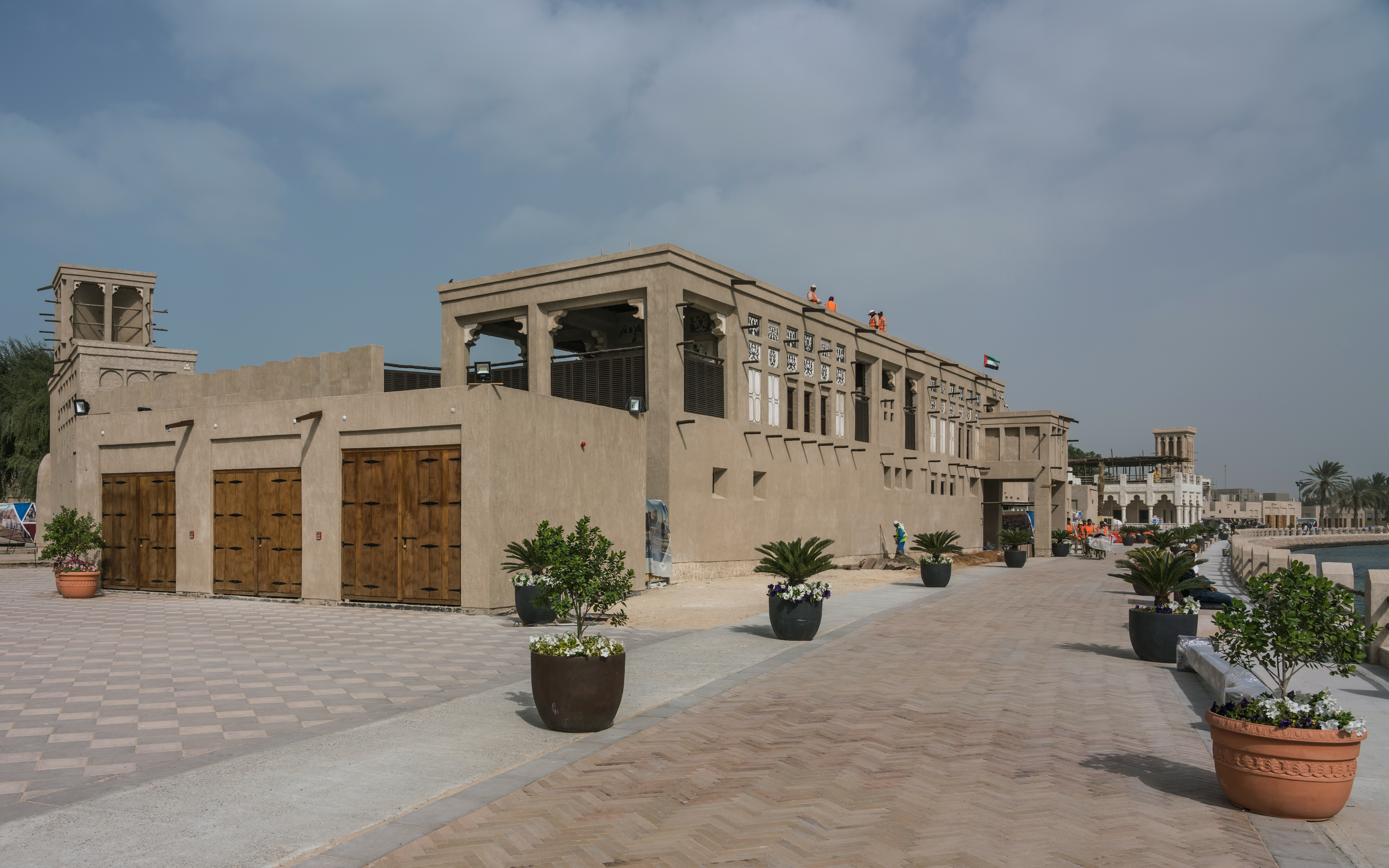
The Sheikh Obaid bin Thani House.

The Sheikh Obaid bin Thani House is a historic building and former residence of Sheikh Obaid bin Thani, located in Dubai, United Arab Emirates.

The house was built of stone from the sea, gypsum, and mud in 1916. It is now a museum. The house is located in the Al Shindagha area close to the Sheikh Saeed Al Maktoum House.

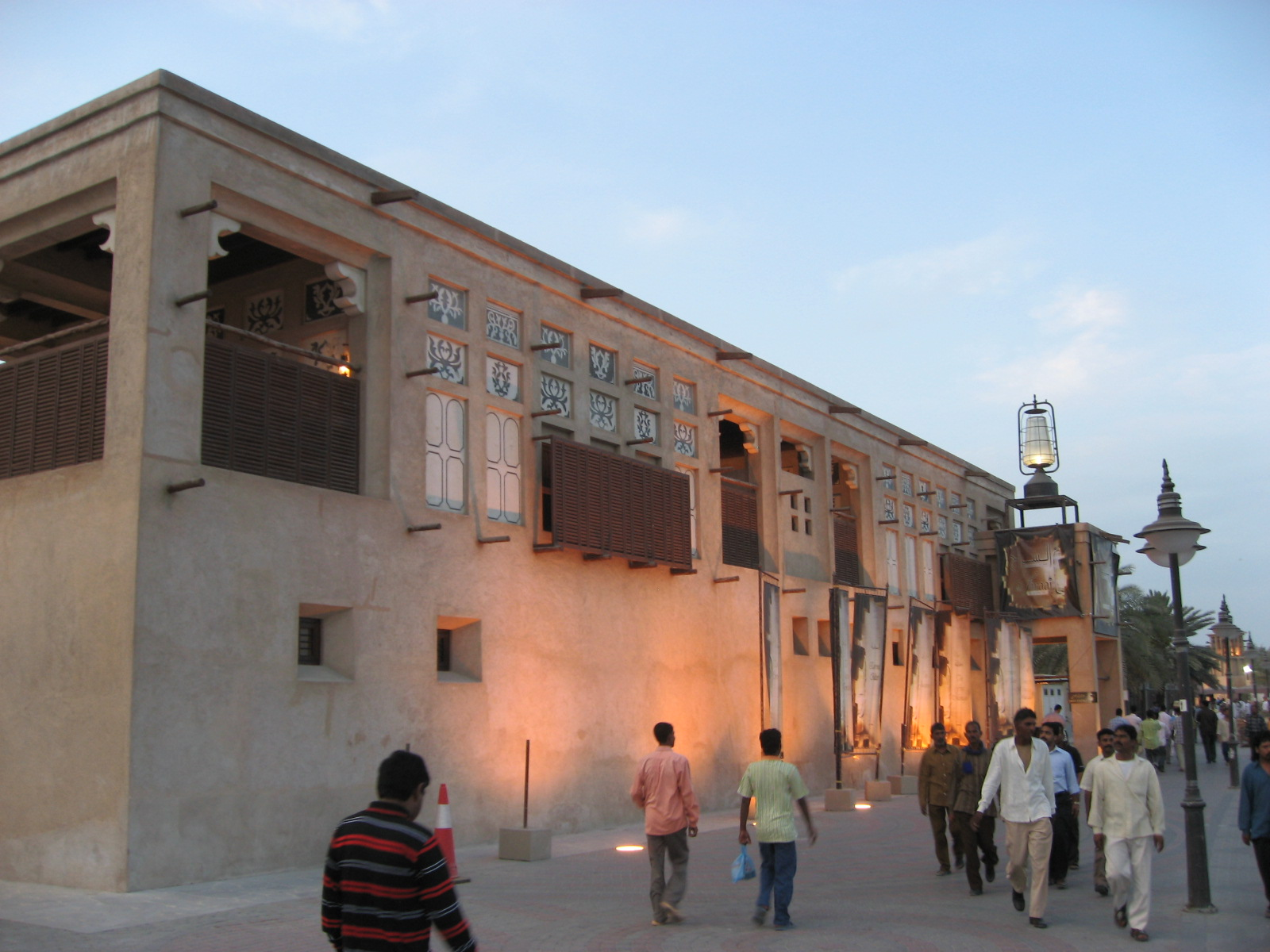
Sheikh Obaid bin Thani House, 2008
