= Dubai Pearl =

Coordinates: 25°05′55″N 55°09′36″E

- Interactive map of the Dubai Pearl area

General information
- Status: Under construction
- Construction started: 2004
- Estimated completion: 2027
- Opening: 2028
- Owner: Pearl Dubai FZ LLC

Height
- Roof: 300 m (984 ft)

Technical details
- Floor count: 73
- Floor area: 1,850,000 m^{2} (19,900,000 sq ft)

Design and construction
- Architect: Schweger Associated Architect
- Developer: Al Habtoor Engineering Enterprises, and Leighton Contractors
- Structural engineer: e.construct

Website
- https://www.dubaipearl.com/

Dubai Pearl (Arabic: لؤلؤة دبي) was a planned project for a 73-storey, 300 m (984 ft), tall residential skyscraper situated along Al Sufouh Road in Dubai, United Arab Emirates.

The project was first announced in 2002. Construction was halted in 2006 and the project was canceled and demolished in 2023.

== History ==
Dubai Pearl was initially launched by Omnix Group in 2002. The project was then acquired by Tecom Group in 2007 and sold to Abu Dhabi Al-Fahim Group later that year, but progress stalled on the project since then.

In 2014, Hong Kong-based Chow Tai Fook Endowment Industry Investment Development (CTFE) reportedly bought a $1.9bn share of the project, promising to restart the project later that year, though that never happened.

== Future proposal ==
Canadian businessman Michael Henderson has proposed Project Moon, a 900-foot (270 m) replica of the Moon paid for by Moon World Resorts Inc., which he co-founded. To be located on top of a circular 100-foot (30 m) building, it would include a 4000-room hotel and an area seating 10,000, and possibly a casino, and would give people the experience that simulates walking on the Moon. It would be lighted at night and the amount of light could vary, as with phases of the Moon.

== See also ==
- List of tallest buildings in Dubai
