= Khatib and Alami =

International multidisciplinary consultancy firm

- Company type: Private
- Industry: Construction, engineering, consulting
- Founded: 1964; 62 years ago
- Headquarters: Beirut, Lebanon
- Key people: Najib Khatib, CEO
- Website: khatibalami.com

Khatib & Alami (K&A) (Arabic: خطيب وعلمي) is an international multidisciplinary consultancy firm established in the early 1960s. The company provides services in architecture, engineering, urban and regional planning, transportation, water and environmental engineering, power and renewables, geotechnical and civil engineering, oil and gas, program management, and digital solutions.

The firm operates across 28 offices globally and employs more than 6,000 professionals.

Its holding company is based in Singapore, with regional headquarters in Beirut and Riyadh, and an executive office in Dubai. Khatib & Alami has contributed to various large-scale infrastructure and development projects, including transportation systems, masterplans, and public utilities.

In 2023, the company has been ranked among the Top 50 International Design Firms and Top 10 in the Middle East by Engineering News-Record (ENR).

== History ==
Khatib & Alami (K&A) was established in February 1964 by the founders, late Prof. Mounir Khatib and latethe Dr. Zuheir Alami.

Founded in Lebanon, the company began expanding its regional operations by the 1980s, establishing a presence in Saudi Arabia, the United Arab Emirates, Oman, and Bahrain. By the early 1990s, the firm had extended its services to additional countries, including Iraq, Belgium, Kazakhstan, and Tajikistan. In recent years, K&A has expanded into various African markets, offering engineering and architectural consultancy services across multiple continents.

In 2017, Dr. Najib Khatib was elected chairman of the Board of Directors. Under his leadership, K&A marked several milestones in 2020, including an extension of its largest PMO project in KSA and the renewal of contracts with Aramco and KSA’s Ministry of Housing.

== Awards ==
Khatib & Alami has received industry recognition across engineering, digital innovation, and workplace culture.

The firm was named Consultant of the Year at the Innovation in Construction & FM Awards in 2020. In 2022, it was awarded BIM Organisation of the Year at the Construction Technology Awards.

In 2023 and 2024, Khatib & Alami received awards at the Esri Infrastructure Management & GIS Conference, including the Utility Network Implementation Award and the Implementation Award.

In 2025, the firm was recognized with the Digital Transformation of the Year award at the Construction Technology Awards, as well as Engineering Consultancy Firm of the Year at the Big 5 Egypt Impact Awards.

The company’s operations in Saudi Arabia were also certified as a Great Place to Work by Great Place to Work in 2025.
