= Dubai Food City =

Dubai Food City is a free economic zone development project in Dubai, which is in planning stages. The food city will be able to hold 400-500 companies, it is meant for the wholesale food merchants. Dubai Food City is estimated to cost US$200 million (AED 734 million), its first phase was expected to be completed in 2012. The project will be 5,000,000 square feet (460,000 m^{2}) in area.

== About Food City ==
Detailed Plans for the city were never released however a speculative plan for Food City was developed by a team led by Steven Velegrinis at GLCA, a Landscape Architecture firm that focuses on landscape urbanism. The master plan was inspired by the Dubai Chamber of Commerce announcement in early 2009 of a new free zone for logistics and transit zone for food shipping to be entitled Food City. Their goal was to turn the city sector self-sufficient and financial viability. The planning ideas of GLCA include artificial roof landscapes, renewable energy systems, aquatic farms, vertically stacked landscape surfaces, and thermal conditioning. This scheme was purely speculative and not commissioned by the developer. It was intended to fire the spirit between Dubai and Abu Dhabi's Masdar City.

Dubai Food City is known as a free zone development and is able to hold between 400 and 500 companies. It being such a large development is increasing food security in the UAE which already imports 90 per cent of its food. "It will make prices more competitive and will allow sufficient stock at any given time right on your doorstep, so there will never be a shortage," stated Qasim.

== See also ==
- List of development projects in Dubai
