= Paramount Theme Park (Dubai) =

Paramount Theme Park was a proposed theme park to be built in Dubai, UAE. Paramount signed a licensing pact with the UAE in 2007 with Ruwaad Holdings to build the park. The project was estimated to house hotels and resorts, restaurants and themed retail outlets and cost US$2.5 billion to develop. Under terms of the licensing agreement, the park would be operated by Paramount Parks and was expected to attract about 13 million patrons annually.

Development plans were put on hold in 2016 and the park never opened.
