= Tamani Hotel Marina =

Hotel in Dubai, UAE

- Interactive map of the Tamani Hotel Marina area

General information
- Type: Skyscraper - Hotel
- Location: Dubai, United Arab Emirates 25° 5′ 27.7" N, 55° 8′ 56.77" E
- Construction started: 2004
- Completed: 2006

Height
- Roof: 207 m (679 ft)

Technical details
- Floor count: 54

Tamani Hotel Marina (also known as Number One Dubai Marina) is a 55-story hotel in Dubai, United Arab Emirates.

== About ==
The hotel is a family oriented hotel and is guests drawn from countries such as Kazakhstan and Azerbaijan. The hotel has promoted itself as offering a "Shopping Experience". It increased its guest numbers by 5% between 2012 and 2013.

The hotel is situated directly opposite the Dubai Marina and Yacht Club. The 55-story tower, built in steel and glass, has 245 bedroom apartments. The property is decorated in a contemporary Arabic style. Facilities include outdoor and indoor pools, a gym, and a health club complete with a sauna, spa, and Jacuzzi.

It is 207 meters (679 feet) high. The hotel overlooks Palm Islands and is near Jumeirah Beach.

== Awards ==
- The hotel won a 2013 World Luxury Hotel Award.
- The hotel was recognized at MENA (Middle East and North Africa) Travel Awards 2013 with the silver medal.

== See also ==
- List of tallest hotels in the world
- List of tallest buildings in Dubai
