= Duja Tower =

- Interactive map of the Duja Tower area

General information
- Status: Completed
- Type: Residential, office
- Architectural style: Postmodern
- Location: Dubai, United Arab Emirates, Sheikh Zayed Road
- Coordinates: 25.2289°N 55.2863°E
- Construction started: 2009
- Completed: 2017

Height
- Architectural: 191 m (627 ft)
- Tip: 191 m (627 ft)

Technical details
- Floor count: 53
- Floor area: 110,380 m^{2} (1,188,120 ft^{2})
- Lifts/elevators: 12

Design and construction
- Architects: ZAS Architects; National Engineering Bureau
- Developer: Nasser Lootah Real Estate
- Structural engineer: Port Saeed Engineering

Website
- www.dujatower.ae

The Duja Tower is a 191 metres (627 feet) mixed-use skyscraper in Dubai, United Arab Emirates. It has 53 floors. The building was designed by ZAS Architects and National Engineering Bureau, while the structural design was designed by Port Saeed Engineering. In addition, it was developed by Nasser Lootah Real Estate. Construction of the tower started in 2009 and completed in 2017.

On the evening of 20 February 2020, a fire broke out on the upper parts of the building's claddings. In response, the residents were evacuated and sheltered to the nearby buildings. The National reported that the claddings were similar to that of Grenfell Tower fire. No injuries were reported. On 22 February 2020, the residents were permitted to return to the building.

== See also ==
- List of tallest buildings in Dubai
