= Bawadi =

Failed development project in Dubai

Bawadi is a sector in the Dubailand development of the Emirate of Dubai, on the coast of the Arab's Gulf. The development is focused on amusement parks, hotel, commercial and residential buildings along a 15 city block, 10 kilometres (6 mi), transit zone. The project was first announced by the government of Dubai on 1 May 2006. The developer is Tatweer, a subsidiary of Dubai Holding. Arif Mubarak was the initial CEO of the Bawadi development.

The Bawadi original master plan had a central boulevard with space for thirty-one hotels with 29,000 rooms. One such was the Asia-Asia Hotel which would have been among the largest hotels in the world with more than 6,500 rooms. The hotels along the strip were designed to have various themes from Asian, various American countries, Middle Eastern, African, European, and universal. An example was the Wild Wild West Hotel with an American theme. The project estimated total cost was over US$100 billion. The first residential development would have been 308 townhouses with a community centre, centered on a retail area. The master plan was revised in 2007 to include fifty-one hotels with over 60,000 new hotel rooms.

The Bawadi development suffered severely from the 2008 real estate collapse. For example, the Desert Gate Hotels and Towers part of the project was completely cancelled. The Bawadi project web page, bawadi.info, was closed in August 2014.
