= Al Salam Tecom Tower =

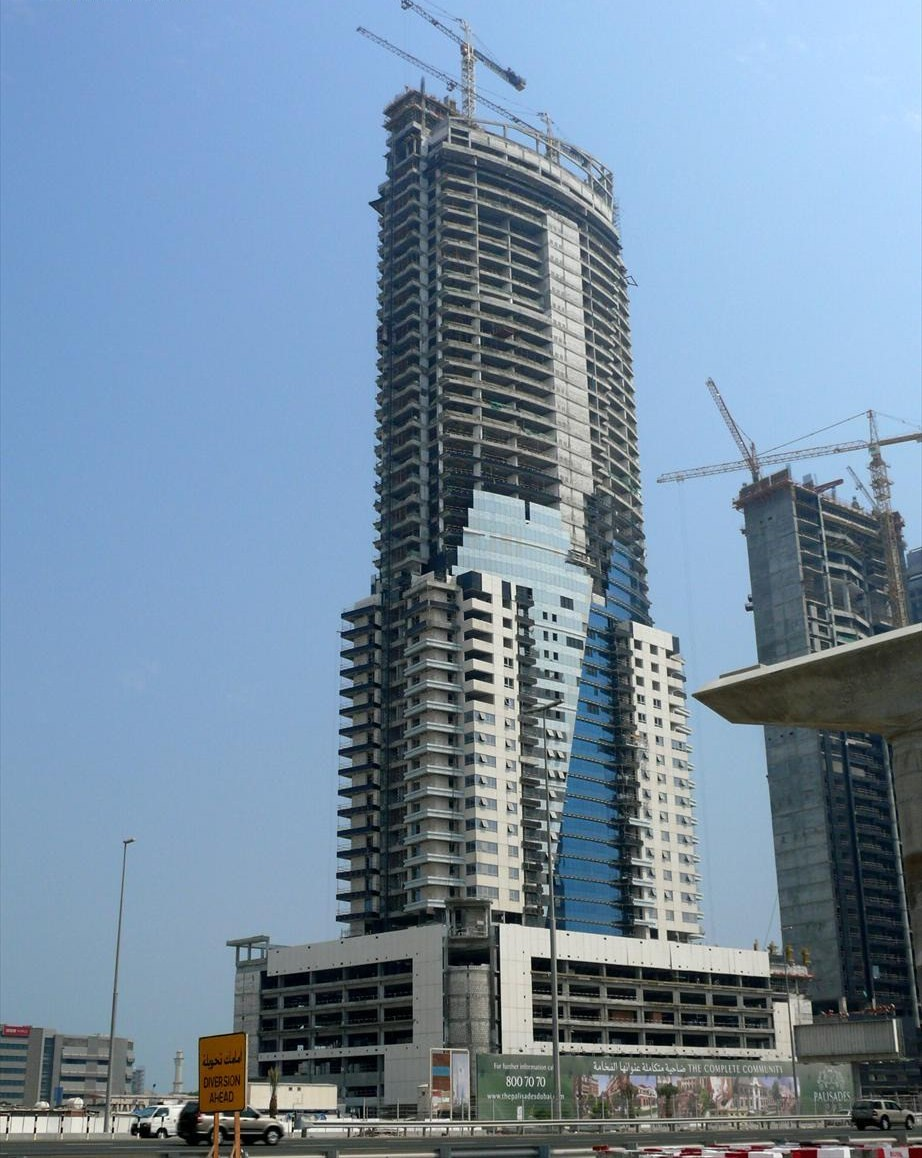
- Al Salam Tecom Tower under construction on 4 August 2007.
- Interactive map of the Al Salam Tecom Tower area

General information
- Location: Dubai, United Arab Emirates
- Coordinates: 25°06′06.29″N 55°10′15.74″E
- Completed: 2008

Technical details
- Floor count: 47

Design and construction
- Architect: DAR Consult

The Al Salam Tecom Tower is a 47-floor tower in the Dubai Media City in Dubai, United Arab Emirates. The tower has a total structural height of 195 m (640 ft). Construction of the Al Salam Tecom Tower was completed in 2008.

On 14 May 2008, a fire broke out on the 47th floor of Al Salam Tecom Tower. There were no reported injuries. The roof of the building is shaped on an angle where it would draw a straight line to Mecca if extended. This rooftop quirk is copied on the NBAD Tower nearby.

== See also ==
- List of tallest buildings in Dubai
