= Burj Al Salam =

Skyscraper in Dubai

- Interactive map of the Burj Al Salam area

General information
- Status: Completed
- Type: Office, Residential, Hotel
- Architectural style: Postmodern
- Location: Sheikh Zayed Road, Dubai, United Arab Emirates
- Coordinates: 25.2297514°N 55.2865759°E
- Construction started: 2008
- Completed: 2014

Height
- Architectural: 197.45 m (647.8 ft)

Technical details
- Material: Concrete
- Floor count: 58

Design and construction
- Architect: DAR Consult
- Structural engineer: Ramboll Group

Burj Al Salam is a 197.45 metres (647.8 feet) tall mixed use skyscraper at Sheikh Zayed Road in Dubai, United Arab Emirates. It has 58 floors. The building was designed by DAR Consult, while its structural design was designed by Ramboll Group. The construction of the tower was started in 2008. It was completed in 2014.

The project is divided into three towers with different functions. The first is a 54-floor hotel tower, which has two mechanical floors, a mezzanine, a ground floor, and four underground floors; the second is a 54-floor residential tower, which has two mechanical floors; while the third is a 50-floor office tower, which also has two mechanical floors. All of them are connected by the 4-floor podium (base) and floors 10.

== See also ==
- List of tallest buildings in Dubai
