= Burj Vista =

- The Grand Boulevard
- View of Burj Vista from At the Top Observatory, Burj Khalifa.

General information
- Status: Completed
- Type: Residential
- Location: Mohammed Bin Rashid Boulevard, Downtown Dubai, Dubai, United Arab Emirates
- Coordinates: 25.19844°N 55.27076°E
- Construction started: 2013
- Completed: 2017 (tower 2), 2018 (tower 1)

Height
- Architectural: 254.6 m (835 ft) (tower 1)
- Top floor: 243.9 m (800 ft) (tower 1); 98.1 m (322 ft) (tower 2)

Technical details
- Floor count: 66 (tower 1); 20 (tower 2)

Design and construction
- Architect: Adrian Smith
- Developer: Emaar Properties
- Structural engineer: BH.NS Engineering Consultants
- Main contractor: AGCCIC

Website
- www.emaar.com/en/our-communities/downtown-dubai/burj-vista

The Burj Vista also known as The Grand Boulevard Tower is a twin-tower skyscraper complex in Dubai, United Arab Emirates consisting of a 66-story tower and 20-story tower. Both towers are residential and consist of 520 and 120 apartments respectively. It was designed by Adrian Smith, who also designed Burj Khalifa.

== History ==
The Burj Vista was announced in April 2013 with sales launched on the same month. Its construction began in 2014 and finished in 2018 with Burj Vista 1 being finished.

== Amenities ==
The Burj Vista towers is directly linked to the newly opened pedestrian link that connects the Dubai Metro station with Downtown Dubai.

The boulevard level of the towers features several high-end retail outlets and restaurants.

Other amenities include a gymnasium, children’s play areas, multimedia hall, business centre, play room, lounge areas, swimming pool and kid’s pool, badminton and half a basketball court, reading areas and landscaped areas.

== See also ==
- Downtown Dubai
- Burj Khalifa
- List of tallest buildings in Dubai
- List of tallest buildings in the United Arab Emirates
