= Bayside Residence =

Residential tower in Dubai, UAE

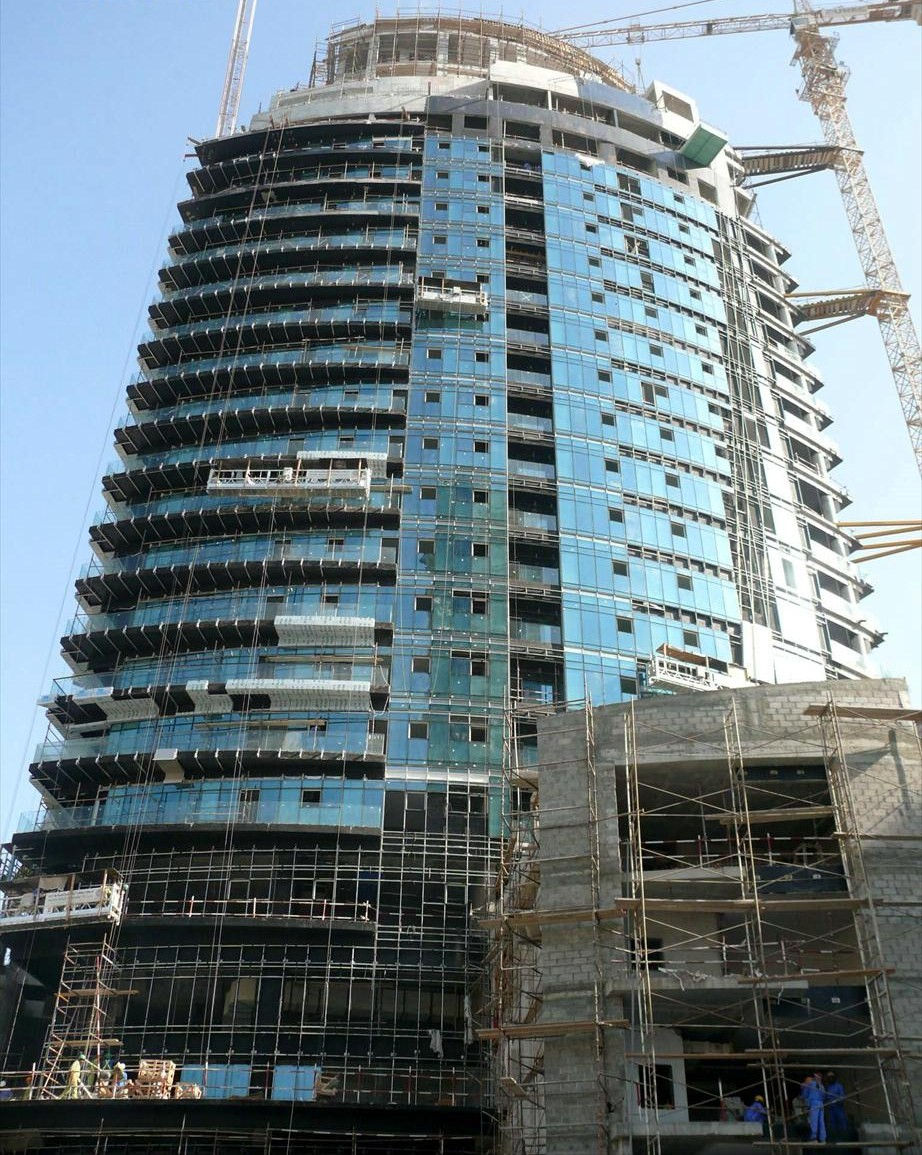
- Bayside Residence nearing completion on 6 December 2007
- Interactive map of the Bayside Residence area

General information
- Status: Completed
- Type: Residential
- Location: Dubai Marina, Dubai, U.A.E., Area 392, Block Marsa, Dubai
- Coordinates: 25.0813088°N 55.1451676°E
- Construction started: 2006
- Completed: 2008
- Opening: 2008

Height
- Roof: 120 m (390 ft)

Technical details
- Floor count: 24
- Floor area: 43,292.8 m^{2} (466,000 sq ft)

Design and construction
- Architect: (United Arab Emirates) Archgroup Consultants
- Developer: (United Arab Emirates) Trident International Holdings

The Bayside Residence is a 24-floor residential tower in Dubai Marina in Dubai, United Arab Emirates. The 101-unit building was developed by Trident International Holdings. The building features an Oxygen bar called the 02 Lounge, the first in the UAE. The construction of the Bayside Residence began in 2006 and completed in 2008.
