= The Residences =

General information
- Type: Residential
- Location: Dubai, United Arab Emirates
- Completed: 2007

Technical details
- Floor count: 23 - 44

Design and construction
- Architect: Woods Bagot United Arab Emirates
- Developer: EMAAR Properties

The Residences is a complex of 18 residential towers in the Downtown Dubai development in Dubai, United Arab Emirates. Ten have been completed and eight more were under construction but have been canceled.

== Towers ==
The complex was originally to consists of 18 skyscrapers, only 10 have been built.

=== Completed ===
Rank	Name	Height metres / ft	Floors	Year	Reference
1	The Residences Tower W3	135 / 443	41	2006	
2	The Residences Stage 3 Tower 10		36	2007	
3	The Residences Stage 3 Tower 8		36	2007	
4	The Residences Stage 3 Tower 7		36	2007	
5	The Residences Tower E2	122 / 400	34	2006	
6	The Residences Tower W2	115 / 377	34	2006	
7	The Residences Tower E1	85 / 279	29	2006	
8	The Residences Tower W1	76 / 249	26	2006	
9	The Residences Tower E3	70 / 230	24	2006	
10	The Residences Stage 3 Tower 1		23	2007	

=== Cancelled ===
Rank	Name	Height* metres / ft	Floors	Year	Reference
1	The Residences Stage 3 Tower 11		44	2007	
2	The Residences Stage 3 Tower 12		44	2007	
3	The Residences Stage 3 Tower 9		36	2007	
4	The Residences Stage 3 Tower 3		31	2007	
5	The Residences Stage 3 Tower 4		31	2007	
6	The Residences Stage 3 Tower 5		31	2007	
7	The Residences Stage 3 Tower 6		31	2007	
8	The Residences Stage 3 Tower 2		23	2007	

* Entries without data indicate that information regarding the height has not yet been released.

== See also ==
- List of tallest buildings in Dubai
