= Shangri-La Hotel (Dubai) =

Hotel and skyscraper at Mega Kuningan

- Interactive map of the Shangri-La Hotel area

General information
- Type: Hotel
- Location: Sheikh Zayed Road, Dubai, U.A.E.
- Coordinates: 25°12′29.50″N 55°16′18.62″E
- Completed: July 2003

Height
- Roof: 200 m (656 ft)

Technical details
- Floor count: 43

The Shangri-La Hotel is a 43-floor hotel tower in Dubai, United Arab Emirates. The tower has a total structural height of 200 m. Construction of the Shangri-La Hotel was completed in July 2003. It was built by South African construction firm Murray and Roberts, now renamed Concor.

== See also ==
- List of tallest buildings in Dubai
- List of tallest buildings in the United Arab Emirates
- List of tallest hotels in the world
