= Lighthouse Tower =

- Interactive map of the Lighthouse Tower area

General information
- Status: On-hold (cancelled in 2013)
- Type: Office
- Location: DIFC, Dubai
- Coordinates: 25°12′45.45″N 55°16′51.49″E
- Construction started: 2009
- Estimated completion: 2034

Height
- Antenna spire: 402 m (1,319 ft)

Technical details
- Floor count: 64
- Floor area: 84,000 m^{2} (904,168 sq ft)

Design and construction
- Architect: Atkins
- Developer: DIFC

The Lighthouse Tower is a supertall, commercial skyscraper in Dubai, United Arab Emirates designed by multi-national architectural firm Atkins. It was planned to be constructed in the Dubai International Financial Centre, and was set to rise to 402 metres (1,319 ft) and have 64 floors. The tower was planned to be a Green Building with a huge emphasis put on reducing its carbon footprint and conserving energy.

The tower would have rose as two separate towers, bridged from level 10, all the way up to approximately 300 metres (980 ft) above ground. The structure was to hold a number of skygardens. Construction was suspended in 2009 and the building was never finished.

== Environmental aspects ==
There were going to be three large 225 kW wind turbines, 29 meters (95 ft) in diameter, on the building's south facing side in order to generate electricity. These turbines would have had the freedom to yaw, in order to maximize power generation. It would also have been clad in 4,000 solar panels to generate additional electricity. The tower's overall energy consumption would have been reduced by 65%, and its water consumption by 40% in comparison to an equivalent building. At the building's base, a four story glass lobby would have housed an environmental visitor center. It was designed by the Atkins group.

== See also ==
- List of tallest buildings in Dubai
- Pearl River Tower
