= Dubai One Tower =

Proposed residential tower in Dubai, UAE

Dubai One (Meydan One Tower)

General information
- Status: Cancelled
- Type: Residential, hotel, observation, restaurant, conference
- Architectural style: Neo Futurism
- Location: Dubai, Al Khail Road
- Construction started: Unknown
- Opening: Unknown

Height
- Height: 711 m (2,333 ft)

Technical details
- Floor count: 161

Design and construction
- Developer: Meydan Group

Other information
- Number of rooms: 885

The Dubai One Tower is a cancelled megatall residential building in Dubai, United Arab Emirates. If completed at 711 metres (2,333 ft), it would have been the tallest residential building in the world and the 2nd tallest building in the world, and featured 885 residential apartments and a five star hotel with 350 rooms. with an expected date of 2023 the building was part of 4.3 billion complex called Meydan One.

== See also ==
- List of tallest residential buildings in Dubai
- List of tallest buildings in Dubai
- List of buildings with 100 floors or more
