= Marina 106 =

Skyscraper in Dubai, United Arab Emirates

Coordinates: 25.0885°N 55.1496°E

London Gate Tower (Aeternitas Tower)
- برج إتيرنيتاس (برج بوابة لندن)
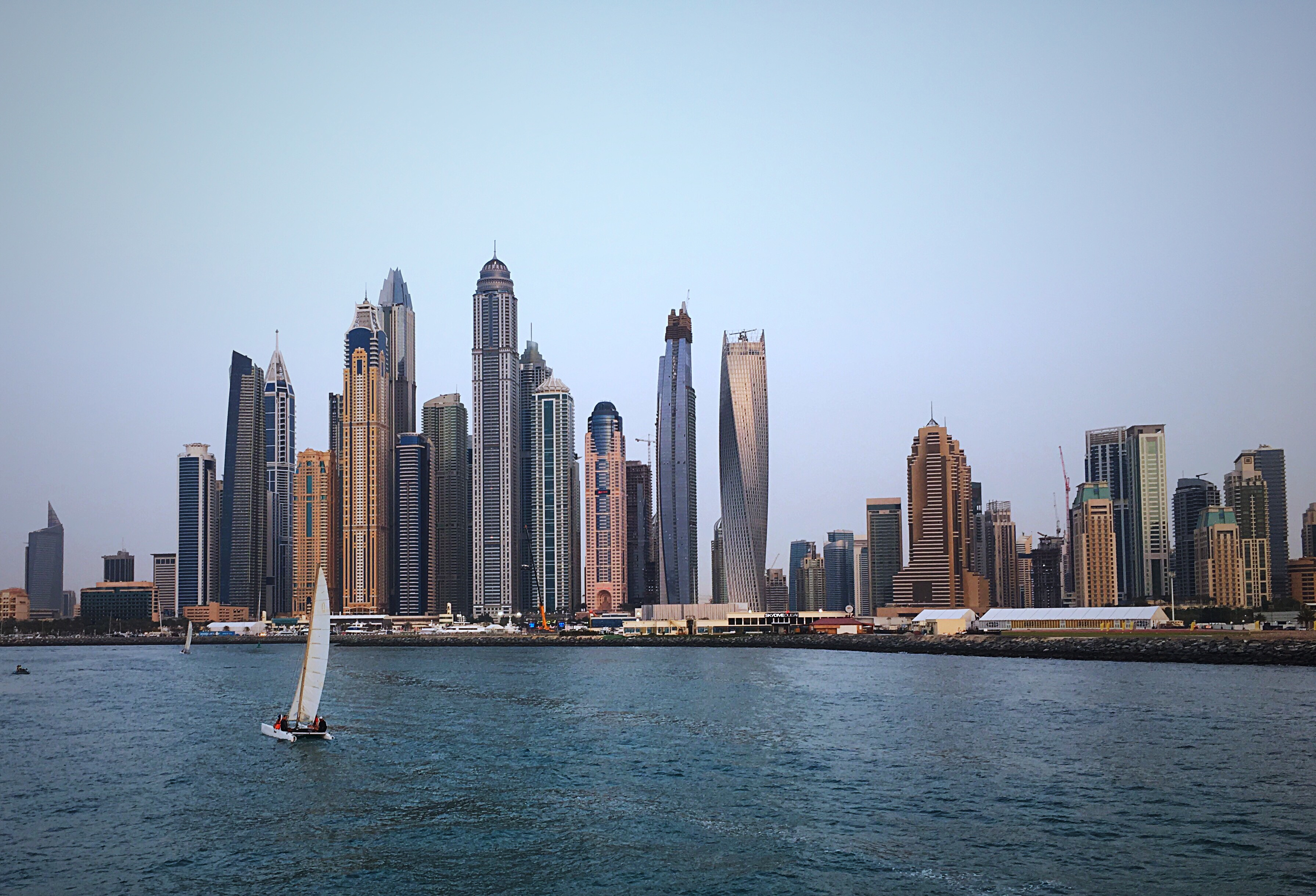
- The address of this building under construction is behind Marina 101 building
- Interactive map of the London Gate Tower (Aeternitas Tower) area
- Former names: Marina 106

General information
- Status: Under construction
- Type: Residential
- Location: Plot No. 392 - 198, Dubai Marina, UAE
- Construction started: 3 April 2009; 17 years ago
- Construction stopped: October 15, 2009 - March 19, 2017
- Completed: 2027

Height
- Antenna spire: 450 m (1,480 ft)

Technical details
- Floor count: 106
- Floor area: 111,493 m^{2} (1,200,100 sq ft)
- Lifts/elevators: 25

Design and construction
- Architect: National Engineering Bureau
- Developer: London Gate
- Structural engineer: National Engineering Bureau
- Main contractor: Al Serh Al Kabeer Construction

Marina 106, also known as the 106 Tower, London Gate Tower and Aeternitas Tower, is a supertall residential skyscraper, partially constructed in Dubai, UAE. The building is planned to rise 449.5 m (1,475 ft) in the Dubai Marina, with 106 floors. The building was originally planned to be completed in 2019. Marina 106 was designed by the National Engineering Bureau, and is being developed by London Gate.

== History ==
Marina 106 was proposed in 2008 as a 425 m (1,394 ft) tower. Groundbreaking occurred in 2009. The foundation was not completed before the 2009 Dubai debt standstill and the ensuing property bust put the project on hold. During this period, the project was redesigned, gaining 20 m (66 ft) to become 445 m. Construction restarted on December 2, 2013, but it was halted again on April 11, 2017.

In late 2023 it was announced that Marina 106 had been acquired by Dubai developer London Gate in collaboration with the Swiss watch manufacturer Franck Muller. It was later said that the tower would be redesigned with the addition of a large clock at the top of the tower and a minor height increase of 5 m (16 ft) making it 450 m. Marina 106, which will not be the world's tallest residential building (which is New York City's Central Park Tower), will be advertised as the tallest branded residential tower and the tallest residential clock tower in the world. In January 2024, it was renamed to Franck Muller Aeternitas by London Gate (Aeternitas Tower) and resumed construction in April 2024.

== See also ==
- Marina 101
- List of tallest buildings in Dubai
- List of buildings with 100 floors or more
