= Marina Promenade =

- Interactive map of the Marina Promenade area

General information
- Type: Residential
- Location: Dubai Marina, Dubai, UAE
- Coordinates: 25°04′30″N 55°08′0″E
- Completed: 2008

Design and construction
- Architect: Zeidler Partnership Architects
- Developer: Emaar

Marina Promenade is a cluster of six residential towers located in Dubai Marina in Dubai, United Arab Emirates. The six towers range in height from 77 m (250 ft) to 147 m (480 ft). The shortest tower has 23 floors while the tallest has 39 floors.

== See also ==
- List of tallest buildings in Dubai
