= Dubai School of Dental Medicine =

- Established: 2013
- Location: Dubai, United Arab Emirates
- Language: Arabic; English
- Website: http://www.edarabia.com/746/dubai-school-of-dental-medicine

Dubai School of Dental Medicine (DCDM), founded in 2013, is a dental medical college located in Dubai, United Arab Emirates. The dental college is accredited by the Ministry of Higher Education,offering both undergraduate and post-graduate programs.

The college is a newly established home-grown dental institution launched to support the United Arab Emirates (UAE) community with dental care services and education.
