= List of buildings with 100 floors or more =

This is a list of buildings with 100 floors or more above ground. Dubai and Chicago are currently the only cities possessing three buildings with at least 100 floors. All of the buildings on this list are over 1,000 ft (305 meter) "supertalls" and are among the world's tallest buildings.

== Completed buildings ==
This list includes buildings whose construction is complete, or are topped-out.

Indicates buildings still under construction that have been architecturally topped out but not yet fully opened

Rank	Structure	City	Country/territory	Floors	Status	Year	Height to architectural top	Height to roof	Height to pinnacle
1	Burj Khalifa	Dubai	UAE	163	Complete	2010	828 m (2,717 ft)	739.44 m (2,426.0 ft)	829.8 m (2,722 ft)
2	Shanghai Tower	Shanghai	China	128	Complete	2015	632 m (2,073 ft)	587.4 m (1,927 ft)	632 m (2,073 ft)
3	Goldin Finance 117	Tianjin	China	128	Topped out	2027	596.6 m (1,957 ft)		
4	Lotte World Tower	Seoul	South Korea	123	Complete	2017	554.5 m (1,819 ft)	497.6 m (1,633 ft)	555.7 m (1,823 ft)
5	The Clock Towers	Mecca	Saudi Arabia	120	Complete	2012	601 m (1,972 ft)	508 m (1,667 ft)	601 m (1,972 ft)
6	Merdeka 118	Kuala Lumpur	Malaysia	118	Complete	2023	678.9 m (2,227 ft)	518.2 m (1,700 ft)	680.5 m (2,233 ft)
7	Ping An Finance Centre	Shenzhen	China	118	Complete	2017	599 m (1,965 ft)	562 m (1,844 ft)	599 m (1,965 ft)
8	Guangzhou CTF Finance Centre	Guangzhou	China	111	Complete	2016	530 m (1,740 ft)	518 m (1,699 ft)	530 m (1,740 ft)
9	CITIC Tower	Beijing	China	109	Complete	2018	528 m (1,732 ft)	522 m (1,713 ft)	528 m (1,732 ft)
10	International Commerce Centre	Hong Kong	Hong Kong	108	Complete	2010	484 m (1,588 ft)		
11	Willis Tower	Chicago	United States	108	Complete	1974	442.1 m (1,450 ft)		527 m (1,729 ft)
12	SkyTower at Pinnacle One Yonge	Toronto	Canada	106	Topped out	2026	351.4 m (1,153 ft)		
13	Ryugyong Hotel	Pyongyang	North Korea	105	Topped out	?	330 m (1,080 ft)	323 m (1,060 ft)	330 m (1,080 ft)
14	Guangzhou International Finance Center	Guangzhou	China	103	Complete	2010	439 m (1,440 ft)		
15	Empire State Building	New York City	United States	102	Complete	1931	381 m (1,250 ft)		449 m (1,473 ft)
16	Taipei 101	Taipei	Taiwan	101	Complete	2004	508 m (1,667 ft)	449.2 m (1,474 ft)	508 m (1,667 ft)
17	Shanghai World Financial Center	Shanghai	China	101	Complete	2008	492 m (1,614 ft)	487.41 m (1,599.1 ft)	494.39 m (1,622.0 ft)
18	Wuhan Greenland Center	Wuhan	China	101	Complete	2022	476 m (1,562 ft)		
19	Marina 101	Dubai	UAE	101	Complete	2017	426.5 m (1,399 ft)		
20	Princess Tower	Dubai	UAE	101	Complete	2012	414 m (1,358 ft)		
21	LCT Landmark Tower	Busan	South Korea	101	Complete	2019	411 m (1,348 ft)		
22	St. Regis Chicago	Chicago	United States	101	Complete	2020	365 m (1,198 ft)		
23	KK100	Shenzhen	China	100	Complete	2011	441.8 m (1,449 ft)		
24	875 North Michigan Avenue	Chicago	United States	100	Complete	1969	344 m (1,129 ft)		457 m (1,499 ft)
25	Australia 108	Melbourne	Australia	100	Complete	2020	316.7 m (1,039 ft)		

== Buildings under construction ==
An "under construction" building refers to any structure—residential, commercial, or infrastructure—that is currently in the development phase and not yet completed, occupied, or finalized.
This indicates that the works are still paralyzed, that is, abandoned after a period of construction, but we are not yet fully prepared to resume them.

This is a list of buildings under construction that are planned to have 100 floors or more. It does not include proposed, approved and topped-out buildings.

Structure	City	Country	Floors completed	Floors	Year	Height to architectural top completed	Height to architectural top	Remarks
Jeddah Tower	Jeddah	Saudi Arabia	125	168	2028/2029	504 m (1,654 ft)	1,008 m (3,307 ft)	
Senna Tower	Balneário Camboriú	Brazil	0	147	TBA 2030s	0 m (0 ft)	550 m (1,800 ft)	
Burj Azizi	Dubai	United Arab Emirates	0	133	2030	0 m (0 ft)	725 m (2,379 ft)	
Six Senses Residences Dubai Marina	Dubai	United Arab Emirates	42	122	2028	172 m (564 ft)	517 m (1,696 ft)	
Tiger Sky Tower	Dubai	United Arab Emirates	0	116	2029	0 m (0 ft)	532 m (1,745 ft)	
Uptown Dubai Tower 1	Dubai	United Arab Emirates	0	115	2030	0 m (0 ft)	711 m (2,333 ft)	
Evergrande Hefei Center T1	Hefei	China	7	112	2028	19 m (62 ft)	518 m (1,699 ft)	On hold
DWTN Residences	Dubai	United Arab Emirates	0	110	2030	0 m (0 ft)	445 m (1,460 ft)	
Bayz 101	Dubai	United Arab Emirates	0	108	2028	0 m (0 ft)	363 m (1,191 ft)	
Tianshan Gate of the World	Shijiazhuang	China	0	106	2030	0 m (0 ft)	450 m (1,480 ft)	On hold
Aeternitas Tower	Dubai	United Arab Emirates	98	106	2027	331 m (1,086 ft)	450 m (1,480 ft)	
Burj Binghatti Jacob & Co Residences	Dubai	United Arab Emirates	83	105	2027	317 m (1,040 ft)	557 m (1,827 ft)	
Suzhou Zhongnan Center	Suzhou	China	3	103	2028	12 m (39 ft)	499 m (1,637 ft)	On hold
Greenland Jinmao International Financial Center	Nanjing	China	1	102	2028	3 m (9.8 ft)	500 m (1,600 ft)	On hold
Akhmat Tower	Grozny	Russia	0	102	TBA	0 m (0 ft)	435 m (1,427 ft)	On hold
Chengdu Greenland Tower	Chengdu	China	96	101	2026/2029	440 m (1,440 ft)	468 m (1,535 ft)	
Chongqing Tall Tower	Chongqing	China	0	101	TBA	0 m (0 ft)	431 m (1,414 ft)	On hold
China International Silk Road Center	Xi'an	China	41	101	2027	162 m (531 ft)	498 m (1,634 ft)	On-hold
Eye of Spring Trade Center	Kunming	China	16	100	2027	47 m (154 ft)	407 m (1,335 ft)	On hold
Suzhou CSC Fortune Center	Suzhou	China	21	100	2028	81 m (266 ft)	460 m (1,510 ft)	
Waldorf Astoria Miami	Miami	United States	93	100	2027/2028	293 m (961 ft)	317 m (1,040 ft)	

== Buildings cancelled ==
The following list is of those buildings that were planned to have 100 floors or more, for which the project did start but is now officially cancelled.

Structure	City	Country	Floors	Height to architectural top	Remarks
Sky City	Changsha	China	202	838 m (2,749 ft)	The building was set to break ground in June 2013, aiming to be the world's tallest building. However, on 25 July 2013 the project was halted due to insufficient permission. In February 2015 it was reported that the construction would continue in 2016, but needed to be approved by the national level (for buildings over 350 meters only). Later, in July 2015, no work had been done there for two years. Some of the material they planned to use to build were used by local villagers, probably removing them to make a fishing pond.
Azerbaijan Tower	Baku	Azerbaijan	189	1,050 m (3,440 ft)	The tower was announced in 2012. Construction began in 2015, but was halted and cancelled by 2019.
Dubai One	Dubai	United Arab Emirates	161	711 m (2,333 ft)	Proposed in 2015 and cancelled in 2021.
Tianfu Center	Chengdu	China	157	677 m (2,221 ft)	Originally it was going to have 677 meters and 157 floors, but it was reduced to a building of 489 meters and 95 floors.
Incheon Tower	Incheon	South Korea	151	613 m (2,011 ft)	Foundation work started at 2008. Construction halted 2009.
Wuhan Greenland Center	Wuhan	China	126	636 m (2,087 ft)	Had to be redesigned as a 101-story building to maintain safe approaches to the local airport.
Rama IX Super Tower	Bangkok	Thailand	125	615 m (2,018 ft)	Construction started 2017, cancellation announced 2021.
Wuhan Chow Tai Fook Finance Centre	Wuhan	China	121	648 m (2,126 ft)	Originally it was going to have 648 meters and 121 floors, but it was reduced to a building of 475 meters and 84 floors.
Miglin-Beitler Skyneedle	Chicago	United States	125	609 m (1,998 ft)	The project was cancelled in 1993 because of the Persian Gulf War.
Crown Las Vegas	Las Vegas	United States	142	575 m (1,886 ft)	The tower was announced in 2006. After two major redesigns, the project was officially cancelled in March 2008.
Anara Tower	Dubai	United Arab Emirates	135	655 m (2,149 ft)	cancelled in 2009
Seoul Light Tower	Seoul	South Korea	133	640 m (2,100 ft)	This building was the proposed landmark building of Digital Media City. Its construction started in 2009, but it was cancelled at 2012 because of conflict between the City of Seoul and the developer company and due to lack of funding.
Baoneng Shenyang Global Financial Center	Shenyang	China	114	568 m (1,864 ft)	Construction started in 2014, construction halted in 2019, and was cancelled construction as of 10 October 2019.
India Tower	Mumbai	India	126	707.5 m (2,321 ft)	Foundation work began in 2010, but construction halted in 2011, and was cancelled as of 2015.
Old Chicago Main Post Office Twin Towers	Chicago	United States	120	610 m (2,000 ft)	The project was approved on 18 July 2013 and it was cancelled in December 2014.
Peachtree Financial Tower	Atlanta	United States	119	448 m (1,470 ft)	This building was announced in 2008 but the project was cancelled in 2012.
Russia Tower	Moscow	Russia	118	612 m (2,008 ft)	Construction started and a cornerstone was laid. The project was cancelled in 2009.
Grollo Tower	Melbourne	Australia	113	560 m (1,840 ft)	The tower was proposed in 1997. After a major redesign, the project was officially cancelled in 2004.
Doha Tower and Convention Center	Doha	Qatar	115	551 m (1,808 ft)	Construction started in 2007. construction halted in 2010.
International Business Center	Seoul	South Korea	130	580 m (1,900 ft)	The tower was proposed in 2000, the project was cancelled in 2008 and then was evolved into Seoul Lite Tower, which was later cancelled in 2012.
Meraas Tower	Dubai	United Arab Emirates	112	550 m (1,800 ft)	The tower was proposed in 2008, the project was cancelled in 2009 due to financial crisis.
Nina Tower	Hong Kong	China	110	520 m (1,710 ft)	Redesigned and built as 2 buildings.
Hudson Spire	New York City	United States	110	550 m (1,800 ft)	Proposed in 2014 as Hudson Spire with 550 meters and 110 floors, but in 2016 the project changed The Spiral with 314 meters and 66 floors.
Television City Tower	New York City	United States	150	510 m (1,670 ft)	Proposed by Donald Trump as the tallest building in the world at the time, the project was cancelled in 1988 due to fierce local opposition.
10 Columbus Circle	New York City	United States	137	500 m (1,600 ft)	Now built as the Deutsche Bank Center.
World One	Mumbai	India	117	442 m (1,450 ft)	Foundation work began in 2011, but construction halted in 2016, and was later cancelled, but in 2018 the project was changed to World One with 285 meters and 76 floors.
7 South Dearborn	Chicago	United States	112	478 m (1,568 ft)	Intended to be the tallest building in the world at the time, 7 South Dearborn was approved in 1999 but it was cancelled in 2001 because of a lack of funding.
Waldorf-Astoria Hotel and Residence Tower	Chicago	United States	111	414 m (1,358 ft)	The project was proposed in 2009. The project was cancelled in 2012.
Skyfame Center Landmark Tower	Nanning	China	108	528 m (1,732 ft)	Due to the height restriction in China, it was reduced to a 346-meter, 72-story building.
Burj Al Alam	Dubai	United Arab Emirates	108	510 m (1,670 ft)	Foundation work started. Construction halted in 2009 and finally cancelled in 2013.
Busan Lotte Town Tower	Busan	South Korea	107	510 m (1,670 ft)	On Hold since 2013, to resume in 2018, was cancelled in 2019.
520 West 41st Street	New York City	United States	106	335 m (1,099 ft)	Proposed in 2014 and was cancelled in 2020.
Asia Plaza	Kaohsiung	Taiwan	103	431 m (1,414 ft)	Proposed in 1997.
Millennium Tower	Frankfurt	Germany	104	369 m (1,211 ft)	This building was proposed in 2000 by Donald Trump. But it was cancelled in 2008 due to financial crisis. In 2018, the project was changed to Millennium Tower with 288 meters and 67 floors.
DAMAC Heights	Dubai	United Arab Emirates	100	425 m (1,394 ft)	Proposed in 2006 as Ocean Heights 2 with 460 metres (1,510 ft) and 106 floors, Due to the height restriction in United Arab Emirates, it was reduced to a 426-meter and 100 floors in 2008 and 420-meter 85-story building in 2010.
London Millennium Tower	London	United Kingdom	108	386 m (1,266 ft)	Now built as the Gherkin.
Palace of the Soviets	Moscow	Soviet Union	100	495 m (1,624 ft)	Construction started in 1937 on the site of the Cathedral of Christ the Saviour, which had been demolished in 1931. Construction was halted by the German invasion of 1941 but the project never resumed after the war. The cathedral was finally rebuilt on the same site in the 1990s.
Metropolitan Life North Building	New York City	United States	100	403 m (1,322 ft)	Designed in the 1920s as a 100-story skyscraper that would have been the tallest building in the world. Due to the stock market crash of 1929 and onset of the Great Depression, construction was halted at floor 29 in 1933. There is some speculation as to whether Metropolitan Life really intended to finish the 100-story building.

== Proposed buildings ==
A proposed building is a planned structure designed for future construction, currently in the design, application, or approval phase before breaking ground.
An approved construction project

The list includes buildings that were proposed or envisioned to have 100 floors or more, yet have not advanced to the construction stage. It does not include never built, under construction buildings.

Structure	City	Country	Floors	Status	Year proposed	Height	Notes
X-Seed 4000	Tokyo	Japan	800	Proposed	1995	4,000 m (13,000 ft)	
Rise Tower	Riyadh	Saudi Arabia	678	Proposed	2022	2,000 m (6,600 ft)	
Sky Mile Tower	Tokyo	Japan	421	Proposed	2015	1,700 m (5,600 ft)	
Burj Mubarak Al Kabir	Madinat al-Hareer	Kuwait	234	Proposed	2007	1,001 m (3,284 ft)	
Sky City 1000	Tokyo	Japan	196	Approved	1989	1,000 m (3,300 ft)	
BUMN Tower	Nusantara	Indonesia	156	Approved	2020	780 m (2,560 ft)	
Tradewinds Square	Kuala Lumpur	Malaysia	150	Proposed	2011	775 m (2,543 ft)	
Tower M	Kuala Lumpur	Malaysia	145	Proposed	2017	700 m (2,300 ft)	
Hotel Cambodiana	Phnom Penh	Cambodia	144	Proposed	2018	600 m (2,000 ft)	
Legends Tower	Oklahoma City	United States	134	Proposed	2023	581 m (1,906 ft); 91 m (299 ft)	
Thai Boon Roong Twin Tower World Trade Center	Phnom Penh	Cambodia	133	Proposed	2016	567 m (1,860 ft)	
Shenzhen Tower	Shenzhen	China	130	Proposed	2016	608 m (1,995 ft)	
Al Noor Tower	Casablanca	Morocco	114	Proposed	2014	540 m (1,770 ft)	
80 South Street	New York City	United States	113	Proposed	2016	438 m (1,437 ft)	
Tribune East Tower	Chicago	United States	117	Approved	2018	440 m (1,440 ft)	
Burj Jumeirah	Dubai	United Arab Emirates	112	Proposed	2019	550 m (1,800 ft)	
Legacy Tower	Dhaka	Bangladesh	111	Approved	2016	465 m (1,526 ft)	
Hyundai Global Business Center	Seoul	South Korea	105	Proposed	2016	569 m (1,867 ft)	
NAZA Signature Tower	Kuala Lumpur	Malaysia	100	Proposed	2011	400 m (1,300 ft)	
Bein Arim Tower	Tel Aviv	Israel	100	Approved	2013	400 m (1,300 ft)	

== Destroyed buildings ==
This list comprises the only two buildings that had over 100 floors but are no longer in existence. So far, the only two buildings with more than 100 floors to be destroyed were the Twin Towers of the original World Trade Center in New York City.

Structure	City	Country	Floors	Year completed	Year destroyed	Reason for destruction	Height to top floor	Height to roof	Height to pinnacle
1 World Trade Center	New York City	United States	110	1972	2001	Terrorist attack	411 m (1,348 ft)	417 m (1,368 ft)	527.3 m (1,730 ft)
2 World Trade Center	New York City	United States	110	1973	2001	Terrorist attack	409 m (1,342 ft)	415 m (1,362 ft)	

== Timeline ==
This is a timeline of the building with the most floors out of buildings with 100 floors or more.

From	To	Building	City	Country	Floors	Built
1931	1971	Empire State Building	New York City	United States	102	1931
1971	2001	Twin Towers of the World Trade Center	New York City	United States	110	1972
2001	2009	Sears Tower/Willis Tower	Chicago	United States	108	1974
2009	present	Burj Khalifa	Dubai	United Arab Emirates	163	2010

== See also ==
- List of tallest buildings in the world
- List of tallest buildings by height to roof
- List of tallest buildings by country
- Skyscraper design and construction
