= Jeddah (disambiguation) =

Jeddah is Saudi Arabia’s second-largest city.

Jeddah and similarly spelled variants may also refer to:

== Arts and entertainment ==
- Jedda, 1955 Australian film
- Jedha, a fictional planet in the Star Wars universe

== Places ==
- Jeddah Tower, skyscraper under construction in Jeddah, Saudi Arabia
- Jeddah Economic City, planned megaproject in Jeddah, Saudi Arabia
- Jidda Island, island in Bahrain

== Sports ==
- Jeddah Club, Saudi Arabian football club
- Jeddah Central Development Stadium, stadium in Jeddah, Saudi Arabia
- Jeddah Corniche Circuit, a street circuit located in Jeddah, Saudi Arabia

== Transport ==
- SS Jeddah, former British passenger steamship
- Jeddah Metro, proposed rapid transit system in Jeddah, Saudi Arabia
- Jeddah International Airport (closed 1981), former airport in Jeddah, Saudi Arabia

== Other uses ==
- University of Jeddah
- Jeddah (horse), British Thoroughbred racehorse

== See also ==
- Timeline of Jeddah
- Treaty of Jeddah (disambiguation)
- Battle of Jeddah (disambiguation)
