= List of megatall skyscrapers =

This is a list of all megatall skyscrapers, which are skyscrapers that are at least 600 m (approximately 1,968 feet) tall. As of November 2026, only four completed buildings are 'megatall'. Although dozens of such buildings have been proposed, currently only three are under construction, Jeddah Tower in Saudi Arabia, Oblisco Capitale in Egypt, and the Burj Azizi in United Arab Emirates. All of the buildings on this list have well over 100 floors.

== Megatall skyscrapers ==
The height is calculated to the highest architectural element of the building.

Rank	Building	Image	City	Country	Height	Floors	Completed	Observation deck
1	Burj Khalifa		Dubai	United Arab Emirates	828 m (2,717 ft)	163 (+2 below ground)	2010	555 m (1,821 ft)
2	Merdeka Maybank Tower		Kuala Lumpur	Malaysia	678.9 m (2,227 ft)	118 (+5 below ground)	2024	566 m (1,857 ft)
3	Shanghai Tower		Shanghai	China	632 m (2,073 ft)	128 (+5 below ground)	2015	562 m (1,844 ft)
4	Mecca Royal Clock Tower		Mecca	Saudi Arabia	601 m (1,972 ft)	120 (+3 below ground)	2012	484.4 m (1,589 ft)

== Proposed megatall skyscrapers ==
Indicates buildings that have been under construction
A proposed building is a planned structure designed for future construction, currently in the design, application, or approval phase before breaking ground
The latest in a series of extremely significant buildings that have ground to a halt after breaking ground

Building	City	Country	Height (m/ft)		Floors		Progress
Building	City	Country	Planned	Completed	Completed	Planned	Progress
Rise Tower	Riyadh	Saudi Arabia	2,000 m (6,600 ft)	0 m (0 ft)	0	550	Proposed
Sky Mile Tower	Tokyo	Japan	1,700 m (5,600 ft)	0 m (0 ft)	0	421	Proposed
Jeddah Tower	Jeddah	Saudi Arabia	1,008 m (3,307 ft)	504 m (1,654 ft)	125	167	Under construction
Burj Mubarak Al Kabir	Madinat al-Hareer	Kuwait	1,001 m (3,284 ft)	0 m (0 ft)	0	234	Proposed
Oblisco Capitale	The New Capital	Egypt	1,000 m (3,300 ft)	0 m (0 ft)	0	210	Construction halted at groundbreaking
BUMN Tower	Nusantara	Indonesia	780 m (2,560 ft)	0 m (0 ft)	0	156	Proposed
Burj Azizi	Dubai	United Arab Emirates	725 m (2,379 ft)	0 m (0 ft)	0	132	Under construction
Uptown Dubai Tower 1	Dubai	United Arab Emirates	711 m (2,333 ft)	0 m (0 ft)	0	146	Proposed
Lakhta Center II	Saint Petersburg	Russia	703 m (2,306 ft)	0 m (0 ft)	0	150	Proposed
Tower M	Kuala Lumpur	Malaysia	700 m (2,300 ft)	0 m (0 ft)	0	145	Proposed
Signature Tower Jakarta	Jakarta	Indonesia	638 m (2,093 ft)	0 m (0 ft)	0	113	Proposed

== Cancelled megatall skyscrapers ==
Building	City	Country	Planned height (m/ft)	Planned floors	Year cancelled
Nakheel Tower	Dubai	United Arab Emirates	1,136 m (3,727 ft)	226	2009
Azerbaijan Tower	Baku	Azerbaijan	1,050 m (3,440 ft)	189	2019
One Dubai Tower A	Dubai	United Arab Emirates	1,010 m (3,310 ft)	211	2009
One Dubai Tower B	Dubai	United Arab Emirates	874 m (2,867 ft)	189	2009
Sky City	Changsha	China	838 m (2,749 ft)	202	2016
Tradewinds Square	Kuala Lumpur	Malaysia	775 m (2,543 ft)	150	2018
Suzhou Zhongnan Center	Suzhou	China	729 m (2,392 ft)	138	2019
Dubai One Tower	Dubai	United Arab Emirates	711 m (2,333 ft)	161	2021
India Tower	Mumbai	India	707.5 m (2,321 ft)	126	2015
Shimao Shenzhen–Hong Kong International Centre	Shenzhen	China	700 m (2,300 ft)	148	2020
One Dubai Tower C	Dubai	United Arab Emirates	685 m (2,247 ft)	126	2009
Tianfu Center	Chengdu	China	677 m (2,221 ft)	157	2020
Anara Tower	Dubai	United Arab Emirates	655 m (2,149 ft)	135	2009
Rama IX Super Tower	Bangkok	Thailand	615 m (2,018 ft)	125	2021
Russia Tower	Moscow	Russia	612 m (2,008 ft)	119	2009
Chicago Spire	Chicago	United States	610 m (2,000 ft)	150	2008

== See also ==
- List of supertall skyscrapers
- List of tallest buildings
- List of visionary tall buildings and structures
- List of buildings with 100 floors or more
