= Uptown Dubai Tower 1 =

Under Construction megatall skyscraper in Dubai, UAE

Uptown Dubai Tower 1 (Burj 2020)
- Interactive map of the Uptown Dubai Tower 1 (Burj 2020) area
- Alternative names: Burj 2020

General information
- Status: Under Construction
- Type: Commercial, Retail and hotel
- Location: Jumeirah Lake Towers, Dubai, United Arab Emirates
- Coordinates: 25°03′40″N 55°08′25″E
- Construction started: October 12, 2025
- Completed: 2030
- Owner: DMCC
- Operator: DMCC

Height
- Roof: 711 metres (2,333 ft)

Technical details
- Floor count: 115

Design and construction
- Structural engineer: Thornton Tomasetti

The Uptown Dubai Tower 1 or Burj 2020 is a proposed office skyscraper planned for the Uptown Dubai development near Jumeirah Lake Towers, Dubai. Publicly released plans describe the building as having a height of approximately 711 metres (2,333 ft) with 115 storeys. The project has been designed by the architects of Burj Khalifa and the Jeddah Tower.

== History ==
First announced by developer Dubai Multi Commodities Centre at Cityscape Global in September 2015, it has been designed by Adrian Smith + Gordon Gill Architecture. When Dubai won the bid to host the Expo 2020 in 2013, in honour of the win, the Uptown Dubai Tower 1 was nicknamed Burj 2020 (Tower 2020). Responding to media questions about the status of the project in May 2017, the developer insisted the project would go ahead, saying "Significant steps were taken in 2016 to finalise Burj 2020 District master development plans, to include two iconic super-tall towers designed by leading architects Adrian Smith & Gordon Gill."

== Construction ==
Now, with the Uptown Tower already completed, the Burj 2020 has started site work. The Uptown Dubai and Burj 2020 site is located between Dubai and Abu Dhabi, with road connections to both cities. The development is also situated within proximity of Al Maktoum International Airport.
