= Matajer Malls =

Matajer Mall
- Type: Private company
- Industry: Retail
- Genre: Shopping Centre
- Founded: 2011
- Headquarters: Sharjah, United Arab Emirates

Matajer, meaning “shops” in Arabic, is a neighborhood shopping centre concept located in Sharjah, United Arab Emirates, developed by Sharjah Holding through a strategic partnership between the Government of Sharjah and Majid Al Futtaim Properties.

The first Matajer mall, Matajer Al Quoz, opened in October 2011 followed by three other branches, Al Juraina, Al Khan and Al Mirgab in 2012. Matajer malls recorded an annual footfall of over ten million across the four centres in 2012. Each Matajer location has a Gross Leasable Area (GLA) of between approximately 20,000 and 80,000 square feet.

== Milestones ==
- October 2011 – Matajer Al Quoz opened
- May 2012 – Matajer Al Quoz was selected as a National award winner in the Leisure and Tourism Category at the MEED Quality Awards
- July 2012 – Matajer Al Juraina opened
- August 2012 – Matajer Al Khan and Matajer Al Mirgab opened

== Entertainment ==
Magic Planet family entertainment centres are located in Matajer Al Juraina and Matajer Al Mirgab. The centres house a range of rides, arcade games and attractions for families.
