= Sky City (Changsha) =

Planned skyscraper in Changsha, Hunan, China

- 天空城市
- Artist's impression of Sky City
- Interactive map of the Sky City area

General information
- Status: Never built
- Type: Mixed-use
- Architectural style: Megatall skyscraper
- Location: Changsha, Hunan, China
- Coordinates: 28°19′14″N 112°53′51″E
- Construction started: 14 June 2013
- Estimated completion: TBD
- Cost: $1.46 billion 9 billion Chinese yuan
- Owner: Broad Sustainable Building
- Operator: Broad Sustainable Building

Height
- Architectural: 838 m (2,749 ft)
- Tip: 838 m (2,749 ft)
- Roof: 727 m (2,385 ft)
- Top floor: 733.5 m (2,406 ft)
- Observatory: 733.5 m (2,406 ft)

Technical details
- Structural system: Prefabricated modular
- Floor count: 202 (6 below ground)
- Floor area: 1,050,000 m^{2} (11,302,106 ft^{2})
- Lifts/elevators: 93

Design and construction
- Developer: Broad Sustainable Building
- Main contractor: China State Construction Engineering

Sky City (Chinese: 天空城市; pinyin: tiānkōng chéngshì), or Sky City One, was an 838-metre-tall (2,749 ft) planned skyscraper in the city of Changsha, Hunan in south-central China. The prospective builders, Broad Sustainable Building, estimated it would take just 90 days to construct. Including the 120 days needed for prefabrication before on-site work commenced, the total time needed was 210 days. Pre-construction activities were halted in August 2013 after government regulators required additional approvals.

Broad Sustainable Building had intended to build a 666-metre (2,185 ft) skyscraper, but the local government wanted the world's tallest building; hence the revised plans. The company has constructed 20 buildings in China using the same method and has several franchise partners globally. It was planned to include a helipad at a height of 739.8 m (2,427 ft) above ground.

As of May 2016, plans for the building's construction were stalled, and the foundations of the planned building were being used as a fish farm.

On 8 June 2016, it was reported by the People's Daily that the project had been dropped due to protests over environmental damage to the Daze Lake wetland. The People's Daily said, "Central China's Hunan province finally announced a halt on its ambitious plan to build the world's tallest tower within one part of its rare wetland area. The Daze Lake wetland is the location where the world's next tallest tower was originally scheduled to be built. This wetland is now listed as one of the 20 waters to be permanently protected and will follow non-construction zone policies. It is a pristine wetland hailed as the last wetland in Changsha where many rare bird species take habitat. Shelter of these birds would be largely disrupted by the building of this tower." However Broad Group declared: "We will definitely build the tower" in 2016.

== Building layout ==
Had it been built, Sky City would have been the tallest building in the world, until the Jeddah Tower in Jeddah is complete, with 202 floors. The construction plan calls for it to be built from pre-fabricated units constructed on site in an unprecedentedly short period of 90 days. BSB's plan is to assemble 95% of the building in its factory before any excavation takes place at the construction site. The fabrication process is due to take around six months before the actual construction begins.

According to the plan, the building's 202 stories will have a hotel accommodating 1000 guests, a hospital, 5 schools, and offices. Of the total space available, nearly 83% will be for residential purposes, housing up to 17,000 people. Another 5% will be for the hotel housing 1000, while 3% each will be dedicated to schools, hospitals, offices and shops. There will be 10 fire escape routes, which will evacuate a given floor within 15 minutes; the building will be fire-resistant for up to three hours. It will also have 17 helipads. Sport facilities will include six basketball courts and 10 tennis courts. Plans include preserving some green space around the building.

For transportation there will be 104 high-speed elevators installed. The safety of these potential elevators has been questioned because they take several minutes to get from bottom to top. The 5000 residential properties will be able to accommodate 17,400 residents. The proposed building will have total floor space of 1.2 million m^{2} (13 million sq ft). The main building will have 1.05 million m^{2} (11 million sq ft) of this area, with a basement of 130,000 m^{2} (1,400,000 sq ft) and a 3 to 7 floor-high annex of 35,000 m^{2} (380,000 sq ft). The total capacity of the building will be about 30,000.

The four-layered glass used for the building's windows will keep the temperature of the building constant between 20 and 27 °C (68 and 81 °F). The air indoors will be filtered to be up to 20 times cleaner than the air outside. The lamps used in the building will be made of LEDs. The builders have claimed to be working with some of the same architects who designed the Burj Khalifa, such as Adrian Smith.

== Structural features ==
The project is planned to consume 270,000 tons of steel. For its assembly factory, sustainable building technology and independent research and development will be required. The main advantages of the building will be its earthquake resistance, energy saving, cleanliness, durability, and materials, which consist of recycled building materials, non-aldehyde / non-lead / non-asbestos building materials, etc. The technology at the core of the whole steel structure is modular construction. The building would have 6 inches (15 cm) of insulated walls and quadruple glazing, contributing greatly to energy efficiency. The building will be designed to resist earthquakes of up to 9.0 on the Richter magnitude scale.

Although structural details are not available, outside architects have expressed doubts that a modular design would have the stiffness on lower floors to withstand the wind loads imposed by such a height, without unacceptable amounts of sway, or that the building could be built without high-strength concrete, whose curing time would preclude such a rapid construction rate. Most of the construction and production of materials will take place on site so as to benefit the local economy of Changsha.

== Cost ==
As currently planned, Sky City would cost RMB 9 billion ($1.46 billion) to build. A cost estimate of $1,500 per square meter of floor space would make Sky City considerably cheaper than the similarly tall Burj Khalifa ($4,500 per square meter). Broad Sustainable Group has purchased 67,300 m^{2} (724,000 sq ft) of land, for a cost of 390 million yuan ($63 million).

== Schedule ==
The start date for the project has been moved back several times due to delays in getting government approval to start construction, and amidst multiple conflicting announcements about whether the project has received final approvals. In October 2012, the group announced that they had received approval from the local government and that construction would begin in November, but announced a new build time of 210 days. This meant completion of the project in June 2013. On 16 November 2012, Juliet Jiang, senior vice president of Broad Group, said in an interview that the company would adhere to its previous time table of building five floors a day and completing the building in a 90-day time frame. She also said the building was still waiting for government approval. Later that month the company announced January 2013 as the start for the construction.

The final architectural renderings had been completed and the project was to be approved by the central government in early December 2012. Construction was scheduled to begin at some point in 2013 and plans still called for the 90 day timetable to complete.

On 14 May 2013, TreeHugger reported that the project had received governmental approval and was set to break ground in June 2013.

On 17 June 2013, Broad Sustainable Building Group Chairman Zhang Yue said that construction would commence in August 2013 with the first four months spent for prefabrication and the next three months for installation onsite. The expected date of completion was March 2014.

On 20 July 2013, pictures of the groundbreaking ceremony, at which Zhang Yue arrived by helicopter, along with several dignitaries, started to circulate on Chinese websites and Skyscy. These reports suggest that China State Construction Engineering is the main contractor, that the building was expected to be complete by April, and that it would open in May or June 2014.

On 25 July 2013, it was reported that construction was halted by the authorities because the building did not receive adequate permission. On 14 August 2013, China Daily USA reported that the actual onsite assembly won't start until April 2014, according to Wang Shuguang, general manager of Broad Group's US operation. On 4 September 2013, China.com.cn reported that the project had begun environmental assessment, the first of a number of stages in obtaining official planning approval for the project. By 30 October, the building was in the final approval phases, according to Broad Group.

As of October 2014, there appear to be no reliable reports that even offsite prefabrication has started. The company has recently confirmed that it is still actively seeking to develop the tower, pending government approvals.

In February 2015, the developer attracted attention when Mini Sky City, also located in Changsha, topped out, the 204 metre tower was built in two bursts, the first twenty floors went up in a week but was then halted by red tape, the second phase of thirty-seven storeys was completed in twelve working days. The developer has reiterated his determination to build the full-size Sky City and stated that construction would start by early 2016, however buildings of 350m need to be approved at the national level in Beijing thus the official start date is unclear.

In July 2015, it was reported that no work had been done on the site for more than two years. The excavated foundation pits were being used by local villagers as a fish farm. The developer stated that there was no further news on securing approval for the building. Furthermore, the project was scrapped in June 2016 due to environmental concerns. The no-construction zone will span a total of 199.5 square kilometers.

In 2017, Sky City renderings show a different site has been chosen near waterfront area.

== Criticism ==
The project faces a great deal of skepticism due to the nature of its claims, and doubts have been expressed about Broad Group's ability to complete such a project in such a short time. There is also speculation that it is a marketing ploy rather than an actual project. The head of structures for WSP Middle East (the company behind The Shard in London), Bart Leclercq, jokingly said that he would give up structural engineering if the project were completed on time. Even so, he and others have commended the project for its use of innovative prefabrication techniques.

Doubts were cast by critics over the ability of the Broad Group to achieve such a grand scale project, such as one from 2012 which mentioned Broad's construction of two buildings only, neither of which reached over 30 floors. A tower of such height requires stiffness, typically requiring enormous amounts of concrete and steel and a lengthy period of time for curing concrete. The ability of the engineers to understand the complexity of a project this size has also come into question. (The later Mini Sky City is 57 stories, and took 19 days of actual build time, see above.)

Another factor that may have been overlooked in the designs, according to engineers, is the wind factor. A building with such a height and shape will need to deal with large horizontal forces, but a wind strategy seems to be absent from the Broad Group's blueprint on the tower. Because of a lack of stiffness, winds would generate a huge draft around the building and would cause it to sway, making it potentially unstable.

Other concerns by critics have related to the tower's ability to deal with emergencies. In case of a fire, there might not be means to douse it or to evacuate people as fire rescue crews are generally not equipped to reach such heights. Also, the elevators might be too slow to transport people who need emergency treatment to the hospital in time (though the building is planned to include a hospital). Finally, the structure may also cause subsidence in the local soil.

While Dr. Sang Dae Kim, chairman of the Council on Tall Buildings and Urban Habitat, has claimed that towers up to 2 kilometers are possible with modern technology, he has said that the floor to elevator ratio at that height would be impractical.
