= Mini Sky City =

Skyscraper in Changsha, China

Mini Sky City (小天城) is a 57-story, 204m high building in Changsha, the capital of Hunan province in China. It was built in 19 days in 2015 by Broad Sustainable Building, a subsidiary of China's Broad Group, using a modular construction system. The company wanted to use similar techniques to build a much larger project, Sky City, which was intended to be 202 stories tall, but was never built. In 2017 mini Sky City was involved in international architectural competition SkyCity Challenge, where architects from around the world designed 17 of the hollow atriums located inside of the skyscraper.
