= Uptown Dubai =

- Mixed-use development
- Interactive map of Uptown Dubai
- Country: United Arab Emirates
- Emirate: Dubai
- Developer: Dubai Multi Commodities Centre
- Website: uptowndubai.ae

Uptown Dubai is a mixed-use development in Dubai, United Arab Emirates. It is being developed by the Dubai Multi Commodities Centre (DMCC) and is located adjacent to Jumeirah Lake Towers. The project includes commercial, residential, and hospitality components, with the 79-storey Uptown Tower completed in 2023.

== History and development ==
DMCC announced Uptown Dubai in 2017 as part of its expansion beyond Jumeirah Lake Towers.

== Major developments ==
=== Uptown Tower ===
The development's first completed structure is the Uptown Tower, a 79-storey skyscraper designed by Adrian Smith + Gordon Gill Architecture and built by Six Construct, part of the BESIX Group. Construction began in 2019 and concluded in 2023.

The building contains offices, apartments, and a hotel managed by Accor under its SO/ brand. It received LEED Gold certification and features a glass façade with over 8,500 panels.

=== Mercer House ===
Another component of the district is Mercer House, a residential complex developed jointly by DMCC and Ellington Properties. It includes two towers of 34 and 41 storeys with about 600 units, connected by a podium containing retail and shared facilities designed by Brewer Smith Brewer Group (BSBG). Construction began in 2025 and is expected to finish in 2027.

=== The Plaza ===
The Plaza is an open-air events venue located at the centre of the Uptown Dubai district. Developed by DMCC, it opened in February 2026.

The Plaza was developed as part of the first phase of the Uptown Dubai masterplan, which also delivered the 340-metre Uptown Tower. At the time of opening, two commercial towers of 23 and 17 storeys respectively were under construction, with a combined planned total of 62,000 square metres of Grade A office and retail space. The site spans 21,000 square metres and has a capacity of 4,000 guests. It includes an open-air stage, landscaped lawns, and tiered terraces overlooking the Jumeirah Lake Towers skyline, along with staging, lighting, and digital display systems, including a 43-metre high-definition screen. The venue is designed to host corporate events, conferences, concerts, and large-scale public gatherings.

DMCC appointed 7 Management as the operator of The Plaza on 2 February 2026, to manage programming, including concerts, festivals, corporate gatherings, and cultural events. The venue's first activation was the Moonlight Market, a Ramadan night market that operated at The Plaza from 20 February to 20 March 2026.The market offered food and beverage vendors, a retail section organised in partnership with the Ripe Market, creative workshops, board games, and live entertainment, operating daily from 6 PM.

The Plaza is positioned at the centre of the Uptown Dubai district, connecting Uptown Tower with the wider commercial and residential components of the development. The district is adjacent to Jumeirah Lakes Towers in southern Dubai, within an area administered by DMCC as a free zone and business hub. The broader Uptown Dubai development includes Uptown Tower, the SO/ Uptown Dubai hotel, and The Atrium, a dining and retail precinct at the base of the tower.

=== One Uptown Place and Two Uptown Place ===
One Uptown Place and Two Uptown Place are two commercial towers within Uptown Dubai, comprising 21 and 15 storeys respectively. Both were launched by DMCC in April 2026. The development will add more than 560,000 square feet of Grade A office space to the district, taking its total commercial footprint beyond 1 million square feet. An additional 82,000 square feet of retail space is incorporated into the development.

Leasing is expected to open in the second half of 2026, with completion targeted for the first quarter of 2028. Office configurations range from 2,100 to 17,600 square feet, with select floors featuring multi-level layouts connected by private staircases for larger occupiers.

The towers were designed by Brewer Smith Brewer Group and will include in-building dining, retail outlets, a swimming pool, more than 1,600 parking spaces with valet services, and a dedicated shuttle connection to the Dubai Metro. Both buildings are targeting LEED Gold certification.

== See also ==
- Uptown Tower
- Jumeirah Lake Towers
- Dubai Multi Commodities Centre
- List of tallest buildings in Dubai
