= Uptown Tower =

Supertall skyscraper in Dubai, United Arab Emirates

- برج أبتاون

General information
- Status: Completed
- Type: Supertall skyscraper
- Location: United Arab Emirates
- Coordinates: 25.060639°N 55.141663°E
- Groundbreaking: 2019
- Construction started: January 2019
- Construction stopped: February 2022
- Owner: Dubai Multi Commodities Centre

Height
- Height: 333.4 m

Technical details
- Floor count: 77
- Lifts/elevators: 27

Design and construction
- Architecture firm: Adrian Smith + Gordon Gill Architecture
- Main contractor: Six Construct

Other information
- Number of units: 417

The Uptown Tower (Arabic: برج أبتاون) is an 77-storey, 333.4 metres (1,094 ft) mixed-use supertall skyscraper in the Uptown Dubai district of Dubai, United Arab Emirates. Construction of the tower began in 2019 and was completed in 2023. The tower was developed by Dubai Multi Commodities Centre (DMCC) and was designed by Adrian Smith + Gordon Gill Architecture. The tower is the first completed skyscraper in the Uptown Dubai development.

The development contains 188 hotel rooms and suites, restaurants, conference facilities, offices, and 229 residences.

== Background & Construction ==
The building was constructed by Six Construct, a subsidiary of the Belgian construction company BESIX. The contract was awarded to the company in December 2018. The groundbreaking ceremony took place in January 2019. By February 2022, structural works had been completed after which the tower was officially completed with interiors in the second quarter of 2023.

Additional construction details indicate that façade works commenced in August 2020 and continued following the completion of the main structural elements in early 2022. During peak installation periods, façade installation progressed at an average rate of approximately one floor every two days.

== Architecture ==
The tower was designed by Adrian Smith + Gordon Gill Architecture. The design concept for the building was reportedly influenced by the facets of diamonds, due to Dubai being a hub of diamond trade. The building's façade contains 8,542 glass panels designed to "reflect the brilliance of diamonds". The exterior lighting scheme was developed to accentuate the tower's architectural edges and geometric form, producing varying reflective effects under different lighting conditions. The external wall system incorporates a passive fire-protection solution by Siderise, tested to achieve EI 120/FT 120 ratings in compliance with the UAE Fire and Life Safety Code.

== Sustainability ==
The construction site was partially powered by a solar-diesel hybrid power system with a reported solar capacity of 542 kWp, supplying electricity to site offices and equipment as part of the project's sustainability measures. The building is also certified Gold by LEED standards for sustainability.

== Building Usage ==
The building will be a mixed-use property, with having residential and commercial usage. The building will have the SO/ Uptown Dubai, a five-star hotel with 188 rooms. The hotel is a joint venture between Ennismore and Accor. Along with having 227 residences, the building will have 46,000 square metres (500,000 sq ft) of Grade A office space across 22 floors. The tower is also part of the larger Uptown Dubai district, that will have residential, commercial and leisure facilities.

In mid 2022, the Gemological Institute of America (GIA) announced that it will establish a new laboratory to serve the global gem trade in DMCC. The GIA laboratory will occupy 3,800 square metres (41,000 sq ft) on two floors in the tower in a nine-year deal.

In September 2023, the building received its first tenants, 31 in total.

== Awards ==
Uptown Tower received multiple honors at the 2024 Awards of Excellence presented by the Council on Vertical Urbanism (CVU, formerly CTBUH), including Best Tall Building by Height (300 meters and above), Best Tall Building by Region (Middle East & Africa), and Excellence in Construction.

The tower was also listed as a 2024 entry in the International Darc Awards, which recognise projects in architectural and lighting design.

== See also ==
- List of tallest buildings in Dubai
- List of tallest buildings in the United Arab Emirates
