= AMEinfo.com =

Middle Eastern provider of online business information

AME Info FZ LLC
- Company type: Limited Liability Company
- Industry: New Media; Business News; Publishing
- Founded: Abu Dhabi, United Arab Emirates (1993)
- Founder: Klaus Lovgreen
- Headquarters: Dubai Media City, Dubai; United Arab Emirates
- Products: Business Directory; Events Calendar; News and Features
- Revenue: n/a
- Number of employees: 27 (2007)
- Website: www.ameinfo.com

AMEinfo.com is a provider of online business information about the Middle East region. Founded in the United Arab Emirates in 1993, AMEinfo.com offers English and Arabic information in daily news wires, editorial columns, feature articles, reports, video and radio features, including business directory information and event listings. The website has since quietly been shut down.

== History ==
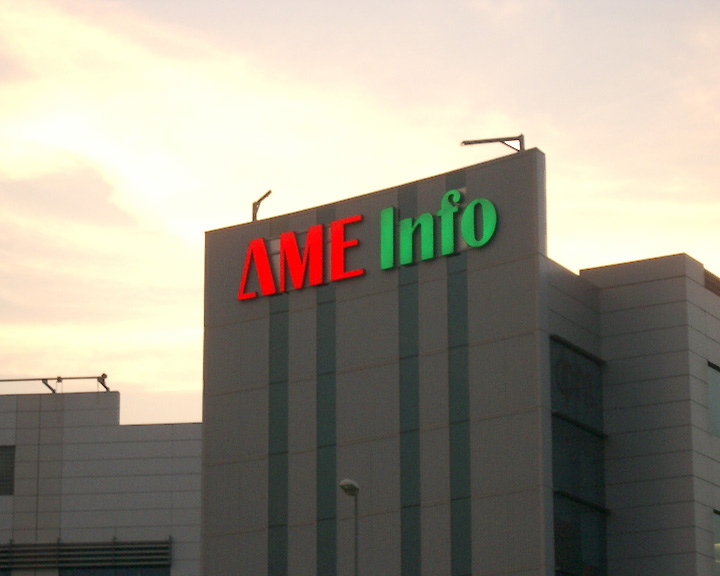
The original AME Info building in Dubai Media City, United Arab Emirates

AMEinfo.com was initially Arabian Modern Equipment Est., incorporated in Abu Dhabi, February 1993 by Saif Al-Suwaidi and Klaus Lovgreen. The first version of the AME Info CD-ROM database of 125,000 companies was developed and compiled late 1996 and sold some 10,000 copies.

In mid-1996, Lars B. Nielsen joined the company as a shareholder and head of sales.

In 1997, sponsors including Royal Dutch Shell Middle East and UPS allowed the concept to expand, and the 1998 edition of AME Info reached a free circulation of more than 180,000 copies (20,000 were distributed in a branded version through Shell in the Middle East magazine).

Following the 1998 edition, more branded versions were produced for Royal Dutch Shell Middle East, Batelco, Orbit Television and Radio Network and Intel. The circulation in 1999 topped out at some 250,000 free copies distributed through direct mail and magazines including Shell in the Middle East, Gulf Marketing review, The Middle East and Windows User Magazine.

In 1999, the company shifted from the CD-ROM platform to the Internet and added content such as company news and current events to the services. In the autumn of 2000, the company added a journalistic touch to the content portfolio and launched AME Info FN headed by Peter Cooper - concentrating on the financial markets and economics in the region. In November 2000, AME Info was awarded "Best Commercial Services Site" by Visa International and Arabian Business.

Professional contributors across the region have joined the site with content columns including topics such as e-business, environment, education, defence and currency commentary among others.

In May 2001, the company moved to Dubai Media City becoming AME Info FZ LLC and expanded its content into multimedia. Its content includes video and audio features, as well as streaming internet radio and business tools such as a currency converter.

In May 2002, AME Info entered into a significant marketing tie-up with CNN International. Under the agreement the two organizations would respectively promote each other's services online and on air. The agreement was extended to include all of 2003, 2004, 2005 and 2006 ensuring daily exposure for AME Info on global CNN International and constant presence for CNN on AMEInfo.com.

In March 2005, HSBC Private Equity Middle East Ltd acquired a significant equity stake in AME Info FZ LLC.

AMEinfo.com was the first Middle East website to achieve certification from the Audit Bureau of Circulations (ABC ELECTRONIC).

In July 2006, London-based EMAP Emap plc (EMA.L) announced that Emap Communications, its business-to-business (B2B) division, has acquired AME Info. AME was to form a part of Emap’s Middle East business which included MEED. The value of the deal was $29 million.

According to the ABC audit figures published for March 2012, AMEinfo.com’s monthly unique browsers is now over 2.4 million.

In June 2013, AME Info was acquired by MediaQuest together with sister site SME Info for an estimated US $1 million.

The entire website went offline in 2023, as per the Internet Wayback Machine.
