= Khazar Islands =

Stalled artificial islands in Azerbaijan

- Rendering of the Khazar Islands
- Interactive map of Khazar Islands

Geography
- Location: 25 km (16 mi) south of Baku, Azerbaijan
- Coordinates: 40.24134°N 49.634242°E
- Archipelago: Baku Archipelago
- Total islands: 41
- Area: 20 km^{2} (7.7 sq mi)

Administration
- Azerbaijan
- Capital city: Baku

The Khazar Islands (Azerbaijani: Xəzər adaları), also known as Caspian Islands, is a stalled development of artificial islands 25 km (16 mi) south of Baku, Azerbaijan consisting of 41 islands extending 3,000 hectares (30 km^{2}; 7,400 acres; 12 sq mi) into the Caspian Sea.

== Plan ==
The stated plan was for $100 billion, with $30 billion coming from foreign investors and another $30 billion from apartment sales, the city aiming to house 1 million residents in a development with 150 schools, 50 hospitals and daycare centers, numerous parks, shopping malls, cultural centers and a university campus, plus a Formula 1 quality racetrack around a centrepiece $2 billion Azerbaijan Tower (would have been the world's tallest). The city was expected to be equipped with 150 bridges and a large municipal airport to connect the islands to the mainland. It is expected that, in general, the city, when completed in 2022–2023, will host 1 million residents. According to the project, the price of completely renovated apartments will be around $4000–$5000 per square meter.

All of these facilities were to be able to withstand up to magnitude 9.0 earthquakes. The president of the controlling Avesta Group of Companies, Ibrahim Ibrahimov, reportedly had the original idea quickly while flying between Baku and Dubai. He told reporters that American, Turkish, Arab, and Chinese investors had shown interest in the project, which he described as being like a "new Venice".

== Construction ==
Construction on Khazar Islands began in March 2011, and substantial building works were achieved during Azerbaijan's economic boom. In August 2014, the main beach area was opened with a fanfare with many skyscraper buildings already part constructed. However, the project's gigantic scale and overly ambitious design became more obvious in 2015 as the oil price crashed. Between May 12 and May 27, 2015, Ibrahimov was temporarily arrested due to his company's inability to start repayment of his/Avesta's debt to the International Bank of Azerbaijan, a debt then reckoned to be around US$57 million. After Ibrahimov's release, company statements later insisted that the project was still scheduled to be completed between 2020 and 2025 with investors from China cited as keen to fill the funding gap. In an April 2017 interview, Ibrahimov insisted that long-delayed works would finally restart later that year. In October 2017 Ibrahimov was reported to have restarted his work with Avesta and declared that he would not leave Azerbaijan but raised doubts as to the continuation of the Khazar Islands project. The Khazar Islands are scheduled to be finished between 2020 and 2025. Considering the scope of the project, some specialists think it will be completed only after 2030. As of July 2026, there is no sign of any construction resuming.

== See also ==
- List of artificial islands
