= Shimao Shenzhen–Hong Kong International Centre =

Shimao Shenzhen–Hong Kong International Center

General information
- Location: Shenzhen
- Construction started: 2030
- Cost: US$6 to 8 billion

Height
- Architectural: 700 m (2,300 ft)

The Shimao Shenzhen–Hong Kong International Center is a planned 700-meter (2,300 ft)-high megatall skyscraper that would be built in Shenzhen, China.
