= Jeddah Economic Company =

Saudi real estate development company

- Native name: شركة جدة الاقتصادية
- Type: Private company
- Industry: Real estate development
- Founded: 2009
- Area served: Saudi Arabia
- Owners: Kingdom Holding Company; Abrar Holding Company; Qilla Jeddah Company; Saudi Binladin Group
- Parent: Kingdom Holding Company
- Website: www.kingdom.com.sa

Jeddah Economic Company (JEC) is a Saudi Arabian real estate development company established in 2009 in Jeddah, Saudi Arabia. Its main project is Jeddah Tower.

In October 2024, JEC signed an agreement with Saudi Binladin Group to resume construction. The announced contract value was 7.2 billion Saudi riyals including approximately 1.1 billion riyals attributed to previously completed work. The anticipated construction period was 42 months.

Construction and concrete pouring officially resumed in January 2025. In March 2025.
