= Azerbaijan Tower =

Former planned megatall skyscraper

- Azərbaycan Qala
- Rendering of the Azerbaijan Tower
- Former names: Tower of Khazar

General information
- Status: Never built
- Type: Mixed-use
- Architectural style: Neo-futurism; Megatall skyscraper
- Location: Khazar Islands, Azerbaijan
- Coordinates: 40.24134°N 49.634242°E
- Cost: (AZM 3.4-5.1 billion) $2–3 billion

Height
- Architectural: 1,050 m (3,445 ft)
- Top floor: 189

Technical details
- Floor count: 189
- Floor area: 7.56 million sq.ft.
- Lifts/elevators: 69

Design and construction
- Developer: Avesta Concern

The Azerbaijan Tower was a planned megatall skyscraper intended to be constructed on the Khazar Islands, 25 km (16 mi) south of Baku, in Azerbaijan.

== Overview ==
The president of the Avesta Group of Companies, Ibrahim Ibrahimov, stated that the Azerbaijan Tower would rise to about 1,051 m (3,448 ft), with 189 floors.

The $2 billion tower was to have been the centerpiece of the Khazar Islands, a $100 billion city of 41 artificial islands that will spread across 3,000 hectares over land reclaimed from the Caspian Sea. The city is being planned to house 1 million residents, contain 150 schools, 50 hospitals and daycare centers, numerous parks, shopping malls, cultural centers, university campuses, and a Formula 1-quality racetrack. All of these facilities are planned to be able to withstand up to magnitude-9.0 earthquakes. The city will be equipped with 150 bridges and a large municipal airport to connect the islands to the mainland.

Ibrahim told reporters that American, Turkish, Arab, and Chinese investors have already shown their interest in the project that will be, in his words, like a "new Venice".

Construction on the Azerbaijan Tower was planned to begin in 2015 and be completed by around 2019. However, the project was ultimately cancelled. The Khazar Islands were scheduled to be finished between 2020 and 2025. Taking into account the scope of the project, some specialists thought it would be completed only after 2030.

== See also ==
- Jeddah Tower
- Burj Khalifa
- Tokyo Skytree
- India Tower
- Shanghai Tower
- Merdeka 118
