= Ibrahim Ibrahimov =

Azerbaijani politician, businessman, and property developer

Ibrahim Ibrahimov (Azerbaijani: İbrahim İbrahimov, born 28 May 1958), also known as Haji Ibrahim Nehramli (Azerbaijani: Hacı İbrahim Nehrəmli), is an Azerbaijani politician, businessman, and property developer. He is known for the close connections to the ruling regime and for initiating the Khazar Islands with the Azerbaijan Tower, which he planned to be the tallest building in the world.

== Early life ==
Following secondary school in Nehram, where he was born, Ibrahimov graduated at the Faculty of Economics of the Nakhchivan State University.

== Career ==
In 1991 he founded the “Ilkan” a company whose work was unclear but may have manufactured furniture. From 1995 to 2000 he served as the elected as deputy of Supreme Assembly of Nakhchivan. He developed a close relationship with Heydar Aliyev, the country's third President, who served as chairman of the legislative body. When Aliyev became president of Azerbaijan, Ibrahimov expanded his business and transferred the headquarters of his company to Baku. In 1996 he formed Avesta which has served as his umbrella company for investment and construction.

His largest project is the construction of an archipelago consisting of 55 artificial islands at the coast of the Caspian Sea. The main attraction was planned to be the world’s tallest tower at more than a one kilometer height. Ibrahimov planned for the project to set several other world records, including the largest car park, the longest boulevard (at 150 kilometers), the most restaurants in one city. The current president Ilham Aliyev encouraged him to build the gigantic island project. Though the project bore a striking similarity to the Palm Islands of Dubai, Ibrahimov denied any resemblance.

In 2015, Ibrahimov was interrogated by the Department for Combating Organized Crime and was prevented from leaving the country. He was questioned regarding a loan of 78 million AZN from the national bank, along with dozens of other businessmen who had outstanding debt.

== Personal life ==
He is married and has four children. He lives in the Qaradağ raion of Baku.
