= Broad Group =

Private manufacturer of central air conditioning

Coordinates: 28.212676°N 113.120792°E

- Industry: Manufacturing; Construction; Energy services
- Founded: 1988
- Founder: Zhang Yue
- Headquarters: Changsha, Hunan, China
- Key people: Zhang Yue (Chairman & CEO)
- Products: Absorption chiller Air-conditioning; Sustainable building Air purifier
- Services: Energy services
- Revenue: US$900 million (2007)
- Subsidiaries: Broad Sustainable Building; Broad Air Conditioning
- Website: www.broadusa.com

Broad Group is a private manufacturer of central air conditioning non-electric absorption chillers that are powered by natural gas and waste heat based in Changsha, China. It is also the parent company of Broad Sustainable Building, a prefab building company. The company was established in 1996 and exports products to over 60 countries.

== History ==
=== 1988–1992: The early years ===
Zhang Yue founded Broad in 1988, registering the company in Chenzhou, Hunan province. Using his savings of $3000, Broad developed industrial boilers based on Zhang's patented design. In the 1980s, most domestically manufactured boilers were of poor quality and had high risk of exploding, while Broad's did not.

=== 1992–2005: Move to Changsha and rise ===
In 1992, the company was moved to Changsha and began manufacturing absorption chillers. At the time, the government provided incentives for non-electric chillers to relieve strain on the national electricity grid, contributing to the company's rise as it became the global leader in absorption chiller by sales in 1996; it entered the international market in 1998 and today, its sales in domestic and international markets split evenly.

In 2015, BSB built a 57-storey Mini Sky City that stands at a height of 204 m. The construction of the tower took just 19 days. The Tower was built using pre-manufactured steel modules which are also going to be used in construction of the Sky City One.

== Innovations ==
Invented in 2009, the BSB achieves high energy efficiency and carbon reduction primarily through thermal insulation, preventing cool air from leaving indoors and hot air from coming in from outdoors when the weather is hot and vice versa when the weather is cold, and requires short construction time since parts are pre-fabricated in factories and assembled onsite. BSB has also been tested to be able to resist a 9.0 magnitude earthquake and was recommended in a United Nations Environment Program report on the rebuilding of Sichuan after its catastrophic earthquake in 2008.

== Environmental record ==
In May 2011, Broad's founder and chairman, Zhang Yue, was awarded the Champions of the Earth Award (Entrepreneurial Vision Category) by the United Nations Environment Programme for Broad's commitment to climate change. It was one of the ten companies to be recognized by the BusinessWeek Greener China Business Awards in 2009. It was also named one of the "20 Most Admired Companies in China" in 2001, 2002, 2004, and 2005 by China's Economic Observer and Peking University.
