= Pearl River Tower =

Supertall skyscraper in Guangzhou, Guangdong, China

- 珠江城大厦
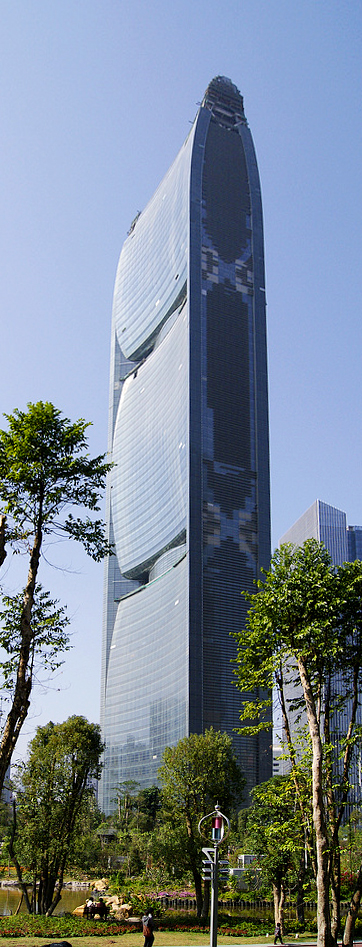
- Pearl River Tower in 2011
- Interactive map of the Pearl River Tower area
- Alternative names: Guangdong Tobacco Building

General information
- Status: Completed
- Type: Commercial offices
- Architectural style: Neo-futurism
- Location: Zhujiang Avenue West; Guangzhou, China
- Coordinates: 23.12675°N 113.3176°E
- Construction started: 8 September 2006
- Completed: 12 March 2011
- Owner: China National Tobacco Corporation

Height
- Roof: 309.6 m (1,016 ft)

Technical details
- Floor count: 71 (+5 basement floors)
- Floor area: 212,165 m^{2} (2,283,730 sq ft)
- Lifts/elevators: 29

Design and construction
- Architects: Gordon Gill; Skidmore, Owings & Merrill; Guangzhou Chengzong Design Institute
- Developer: Abu Zayyad Holdings
- Structural engineer: Skidmore, Owings & Merrill
- Main contractor: Shanghai Construction Group

Pearl River Tower (珠江城大厦) is a 71-story, 309.6 m (1,016 ft), clean technology neofuturistic skyscraper at the junction of Jinsui Road/Zhujiang Avenue West, Tianhe, Guangzhou, China. The tower's architecture and engineering were performed by Skidmore, Owings & Merrill with Adrian D. Smith and Gordon Gill (now at their own firm, AS+GG) as architects. Ground broke on the tower on 8 September 2006 and construction was completed in March 2011. It is intended for office use and is partially occupied by the China National Tobacco Corporation.

== Architecture and design ==
The design of the Pearl River Tower is intended to minimise harm to the environment and it will extract energy from the natural and passive forces surrounding the building. Major accomplishments are the technological integration of form and function in a holistic approach to engineering and architectural design.

=== Sustainability ===
==== Energy-Saving Strategies ====
There were four steps in the approach to the Pearl River Tower's high-performance design: reduction, absorption, reclamation, and generation. These steps were put in place to achieve the goal of being a zero-energy building.

1. Reduction – This includes using low discharge ventilation, daylight responsive controls, radiant cooling, demand-based ventilation, and high-performance glazing.

2. Absorption – This includes using wind turbines, daylight responsive controls, and integrated Photovoltaics.

3. Reclamation – This stage includes using exhaust air heat recovery and chillers.

4. Generation – This final stage works to achieve the objective of being a zero-energy building by creating sufficient energy on-site through the use of microturbines.

==== Wind Turbines ====
The Pearl River Tower's design enables it to funnel wind through four large wind turbines to generate up to 15 times more energy than regular freestanding turbines.

Alongside creating the power required for the building to operate, another benefit to this design is that the wind is re-routed through the tower's ventilation system, filtering it through the ceiling and floor spaces throughout the building.

As well as being designed to tunnel the wind in the most efficient way, the tower was built so its widest side faces the direction of the wind, allowing it to capture the most wind possible and thus generate the most energy.

Winds in Guangzhou are relatively predictable, coming from the south for 80% of the year and coming from the north for the remaining 20%. This meant that the wind turbines' success could be maximized by considering the building's wind loads. To make the most of the prevailing wind direction, it was essential to place the building's broadest face at a perpendicular angle to the prevailing wind.

==== Turbine Usage ====
The building was designed to generate power as efficiently as possible. To achieve this goal, the Pearl River Tower was built to direct incoming wind into vents that lead to its turbines. Explicitly sculpted to guide wind into the turbines, this 71-story building works to ensure there is almost always clean energy being generated.

==== Cooling ====
Due to Guangzhou's climate, cooling is an essential part of keeping those within the building comfortable. As the heat increases to higher temperatures in the warmer months, the radiant ceiling system works to cool the office spaces. Another part of the cooling system design is the use of cladding on the broad faces of the building. Using cavities in the walls to trap hot air from the building's exterior, the air runs through the raised floor system and pushes the heat to specific areas where it can be collected and used effectively.

==== High-Efficiency Lighting ====
To avoid unnecessary energy expenditure, artificial lighting is only used in the building when necessary. When used, the highest-efficiency light bulbs on the market provide lighting for the building without requiring large amounts of electricity to function. The ceiling panels are built in a curved shape to allow the light to be dispersed evenly throughout the rooms, reducing the amount of power needed to light a given space fully.

==== Solar Heat ====
The Pearl River Tower has advanced double glazing that allows natural light to enter the building. There is a double-skin façade in place, meaning the walls have two layers: the outer skin has a high permeability for solar heat to allow it in, while the inner skin prevents solar gain. This is referred to as a double curtain wall. There is a ventilation corridor between the two layers. The layers automatically adjust to allow heat in or out as required. The result of this design is that the building is more thermochemically efficient. It helps keep the building at the desired temperature regardless of the weather without using large amounts of energy to pump artificially created hot or cold air into the building.

The heat that is trapped between the two skins rises, creating natural ventilation. Initially, the building design aimed to create a positive-energy building, meaning it would generate excess power that could be sold to the electrical grid. Complications with fire codes and regulations resulted in the original design being amended. In its final state, the 212,165 m^{2} building uses around 40% of the energy that a building of its size would typically use.

==== Triple Glazing ====
The glass on the exterior of the building has three layers of glazing applied to it. This glazing traps heat within the building, keeping it warmer during the winter. If the heat becomes excessive, it is easily vented out using the tower's built wind-powered ventilation system.

==== Photovoltaic Cells ====
The shading system on the exterior of the tower has photovoltaic cells incorporated in its design. The purpose of these cells is to absorb solar energy, much like the panels on the top of the tower. This has the effect of increasing the tower's ability to power itself with clean energy by reducing the need for it to draw from the local power grid. This adds to the tower's already considerable power-saving capabilities caused by the wind and solar power used in other parts of the building.

==== Reused Heating ====
When coolers are used for air conditioning, the hot water created as a byproduct is then used throughout the building. This reduces water demands and makes the building more sustainable overall.

==== Daylight Responsive Blinds ====
The blinds on the tower's exterior automatically open or close depending on the building's lighting needs. This maximizes the amount of light inside the building when needed while preventing an excess of light from blinding those insides. This is consistent with other sustainable, efficient aspects of the tower's design, as it prevents excessive artificial light usage and, in turn, prevents unnecessary power draw.

=== Influence ===
The Pearl River Tower is designed to be one of the most environmentally friendly buildings in the world.

Of Pearl River Tower's accomplishments, many are related to the sustainable design features include:

- The largest radiant-cooled office building in the world
- Most energy efficient super-tall building in the world
- The tower is an example of China's goal to reduce the intensity of carbon dioxide emissions per unit of GDP in 2020 by 40 to 45 percent as compared to the level of 2005.

In a report presented at the 2008 Council on Tall Buildings and Urban Habitat it was reported that the building's sustainable design features will allow a 58% energy usage reduction when compared to similar stand alone buildings. The building would have been able to be carbon neutral and actually sell power back to the surrounding neighborhood if the micro-turbines had been installed into the building. However the local power company in Guangzhou does not allow independent energy producers to sell electricity back to the grid. Without the financial incentive to add the micro-turbines the developers removed them from the design. If they had been added excess power would have been produced from the building, at the very least, after office hours when the power needed by the building itself had been reduced.

=== Timeline ===
- Fall 2005: Design Competition
- 8 September 2006: Ground Breaking Ceremony
- November 2006: Enabling Works begin
- 18 July 2007: Public bidding for the construction
- January 2008: Main Package construction begins −26.2 m (−86 ft)
- August 2008: Building Core construction reaches ground level 0 m (0 ft)
- April 2009: 15th Level 80.6 m (264 ft)
- November 2009: Glass curtainwall installation begins
- December 2009: Building reaches upper wind turbine level
- 28 March 2010: Topped-out
