= Jeddah Economic City =

Planned urban development project in Saudi Arabia

- Interactive map of Jeddah Economic City
- Location: Jeddah, Mecca Province, Saudi Arabia
- Coordinates: 21.73°N 39.08°E
- Status: Under construction
- Constructed: 1 April 2013; 13 years ago
- Use: Mixed-use
- Website: Jeddah Economic Company

Companies
- Architect: HOK Group
- Owner: Jeddah Economic Company

Technical details
- Cost: US$30 billion (estimated)
- Buildings: Jeddah Tower

Jeddah Economic City (Note: Arabic: مدينة جدة الاقتصادية (romanized: Madīnat Jidda al-Iqtiṣādiyya), previously called Kingdom City (2008–2015)) is a large-scale urban development currently under construction in Jeddah, Saudi Arabia. The project spans an area of approximately 5,202,570 m^{2} (56,000,000 ft^{2}) and is being developed by the Jeddah Economic Company, a subsidiary of Kingdom Holding Company.

== History ==
Jeddah Economic City (JEC), originally planned as "Kingdom City," is a large-scale urban development in North Obhur, Jeddah. The project was first proposed by businessman Al-Waleed bin Talal in 2008 as a new economic and residential hub. Initial plans included a "Mile-High Tower" (later Jeddah Tower) although later engineering studies reduced the height to approximately 1,000 meters. The Jeddah Economic Company (JEC) was established in October 7, 2009 to oversee the development, which was designed to include residential, commercial, and retail areas alongside the tower.

Construction began in 2013, starting with the Jeddah Tower as the first component of the city. The Saudi Binladin Group (SBG) was contracted as the main builder, and the Jeddah Municipality issued the final construction license in February 2012. In 2015, the project was officially renamed from "Kingdom City" to Jeddah Economic City and the "Kingdom Tower" to Jeddah Tower to reflect its broader urban and economic focus.

Construction of the city has been closely tied to the progress of the Jeddah Tower, which was halted in January 2018 after reaching the 63rd floor. Delays were caused by management changes following the 2017–2019 anti-corruption purge, technical challenges associated with the tower's unprecedented height, and the COVID-19 pandemic.

The development was revived in late 2024. A SAR 7.2 billion ($1.9 billion) contract was signed with SBG in October 2024 to complete the Jeddah Tower, which remains the central element of the city.

== Skyscrapers and towers ==
Tower	Usage	Height	Floors	Year started	Construction status	Year completed	Total area	Developer
Jeddah Tower	Mixed-use	1,000 m (3,281 ft)	167	2013	Under construction	2028	243,866 sqm	Jeddah Economic Company (JEC)

== See also ==
- Al-Waleed bin Talal
- King Abdullah Financial District
