= MEED =

Middle East business intelligence platform

- Type: Private
- Industry: Publishing, new media, business news, events
- Founded: London, England (1957)
- Headquarters: Dubai Media City, Dubai, United Arab Emirates
- Number of employees: 120 (2008)
- Website: www.meed.com

MEED, formerly Middle East Economic Digest, is a media publishing company founded in 1957 focused on economic and business news related to the Middle East. MEED also provides advertising and marketing services.

== History ==
The first issue of Middle East Economic Digest (MEED) was published on 8 March 1957.

MEED's founder was Elizabeth Collard, who later became an adviser to UK Prime Minister Harold Wilson on Middle East affairs and an associate of Gamal Abdel Nasser of Egypt and King Hussein of Jordan. She also helped to establish the Council for the Advancement of Arab British Understanding (CAABU).

With two part-time secretarial assistants, MEED was produced on a hand-cranked Ronco printing machine. Every Friday evening, friends and relatives would help staple and stuff envelopes with the 12-page newsletter. Lacking editorial resources, the Middle East Economic Digest was a compilation from newspapers and other reports. Newspapers were flown in weekly from Cairo and Beirut, translated and condensed.

By the time MEED was acquired by Emap in 1986, it had a staff of 20 full-time journalists and 12 researchers and newsroom assistants to cover Middle Eastern business and project news. In 2006 Emap Middle East also acquired business website AME Info.

In May 2002, MEED announced it would launch a trade delegation visit to Iran. MEED stated that top government officials and agencies had participated in the Tehran meetings.

In March 2012, the owning company rebranded as Top Right Group, but retained the Emap name for its magazine's operation, which at the time accounted for around 18% of the group's turnover. In October 2015 Top Right Group announced it was scrapping the Emap brand and would stop producing print editions, and that over the next 12–18 months all titles would become digital-only. In December 2015 Top Right Group rebranded as Ascential, who in January 2017 announced its intention to sell 13 titles including MEED; the 13 "heritage titles" were to be "hived off into a separate business while buyers [were] sought".

On 8 December 2017, MEED was purchased from Ascential in a $17.5m cash deal by GlobalData, the London-listed company formerly known as Progressive Digital Media.

== Current business activities ==
=== MEED Magazine ===
MEED magazine cover

MEED publishes a business-to-business magazine for subscribers every Friday featuring news, analysis and commentary, features, and interviews and a weekly special report. Circulation, according to a 2009 audit by ABC (Audit Bureau of Circulations UK), was 6'338.

MEED was launched in 1957. When Rafiq Hariri drew up plans to rebuild a war-shattered Lebanon, MEED met the prime minister and asked him to explain them. When Colonel Gaddafi unveiled the first part of his Great Manmade River, MEED took a front-row seat at the ceremony and quizzed the engineers. While US tanks were still rolling towards Baghdad in March 2003, MEED obtained plans from Washington that described how the US was hoping to rebuild the country. Three months before going public, MEED revealed DP World's IPO plans. Abdalla el-Badri announced OPEC's potential move from US dollar to euro pricing to MEED. MEED broke news of Saudi Arabia moving ahead with plans for a Mile-High Tower in Jeddah – which would make it the tallest tower in the world – and Nakheel's plans to create a tower over one kilometre high (then called Nakheel Tower, later announced as Dubai's Harbour Tower) to trump Emaar's Burj Khalifa.

MEED is used as a source of Middle East information by the US and British government's – Energy Information Administration, United States Congress and the British Foreign and Commonwealth Office.

The dedication made by Abdullah II of Jordan in 2007 demonstrates MEED's positive contribution to the Middle East for over 50 years. "The celebration of this milestone is a testament to the distinguished insight into the region MEED has provided to its readers for five decades. Your acuity has recorded the region's diversity and potential, not just its challenges and crises."

== Editorial staff ==
- John Bambridge, features and analysis editor
- Richard Thompson, editorial director
- Colin Foreman, news editor
- Andrew Roscoe, power and water editor
- Jennifer Aguinaldo, transport and technologies editor
- Indrajit Sen, oil and gas editor
