= Bein Arim Tower =

Planned skyscraper in Tel Aviv

- מגדל בין ערים
- Interactive map of the Bein Arim Tower area

General information
- Status: Under construction
- Type: Hotel, Office
- Location: Tel Aviv, Israel
- Coordinates: 32°04′53.8″N 34°47′58.3″E
- Construction started: July 13, 2025
- Estimated completion: 2030

Height
- Architectural: 400 m (1,300 ft)
- Tip: 400 m (1,300 ft)

Technical details
- Floor count: 100
- Lifts/elevators: 24
- Grounds: 150,000 m^{2} (1,600,000 ft^{2})

Design and construction
- Architect: Miloslavsky Architects

Bein Arim Tower (Hebrew: מגדל בין ערים, romanized: Tower Between Cities) is a planned 400-metre-high (1,300 ft) skyscraper to be built in the demarcated area of the Bursa (Israel Diamond Exchange) on Menachem Begin Road in Tel Aviv. After its construction it will be the tallest building in Israel, followed by Tel Aviv's 238-meter-high (781 ft) Azrieli Sarona Tower. The building is expected to be finished in 2030.

== Planning ==
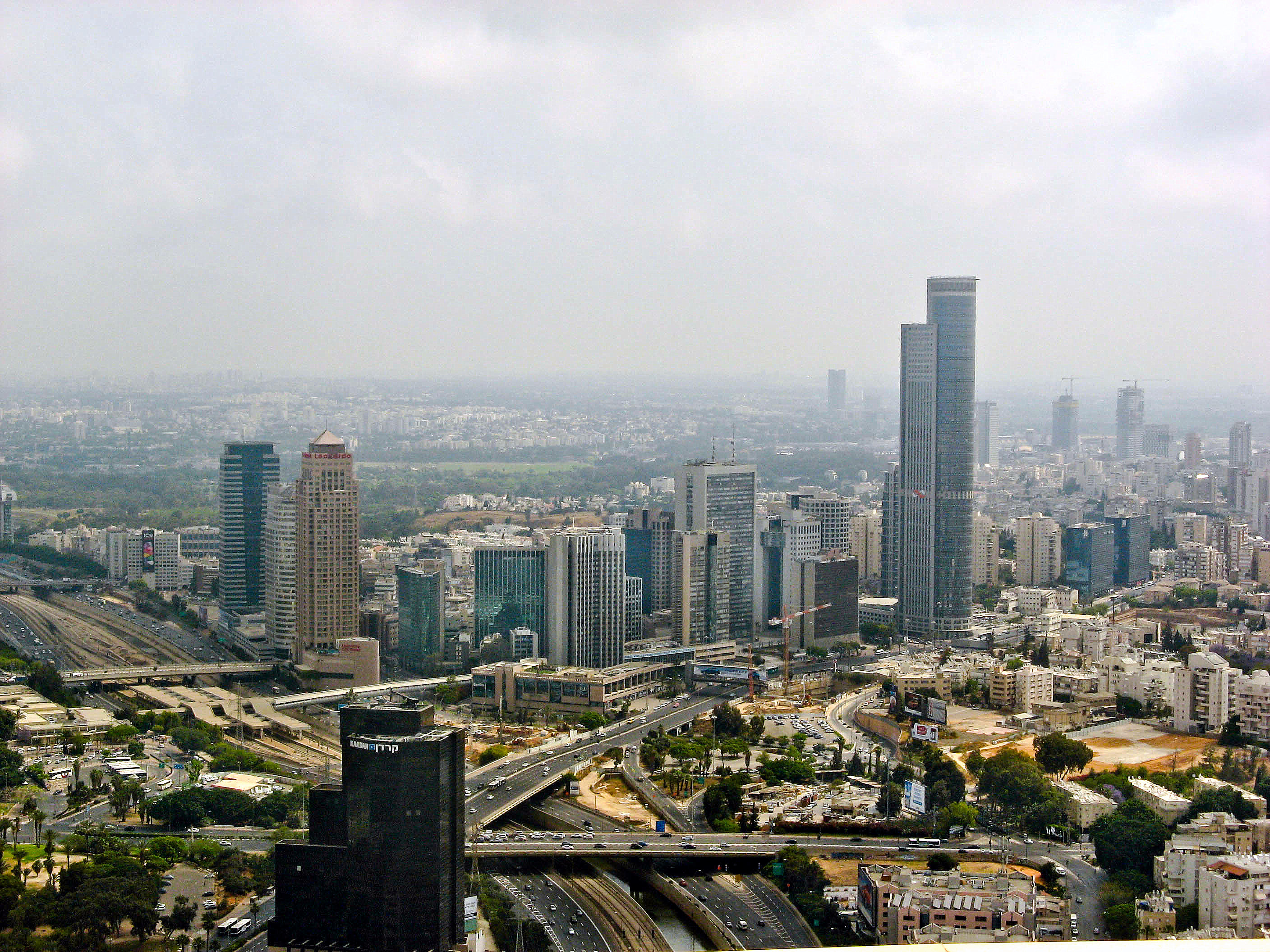
Location where the tower is set to be constructed

The tower is set to be constructed near the Savidor Railway Station and the light railway Red Line on a property owned by Tel Aviv Municipality and currently being used as a parking lot.

Tel Aviv District Planning and Building Commission began discussion on the tower in June 2014, as initiative of the Tel Aviv municipality. The commission approved the city engineer's recommendation to raise the tower's height, adding floors to the existing 75-floor tower plan for a 100-floor tower, and allow it to spread over 166,500 square meter at its base on the ground. The plan also changed to double the public space, without increasing the amount of space for construction, in response to objections by residents in the area. The final plan was approved in June 2018, making it the first time in Israel's history that the Finance Ministry's district committee approves erection of a 100-floor building.

== Design ==
The tower designed by architects Amnon Schwartz and Guy Miloslavsky of Miloslavsky Architects. It has 120,000 square meters of space and will include business and commerce offices, a hotel in top 15 stories, and 10,000 square meters allocated to public spaces. It will not include residential apartments due to its distance from the city's residential areas. In addition to the tower, two six-story public buildings will be constructed nearby.

== See also ==
- List of skyscrapers in Israel
- List of tallest buildings in the world
- Architecture in Israel
