= Treaty of Jeddah =

Treaty of Jeddah may refer to:

- Treaty of Jeddah (1927), between the Kingdom of Nejd and Hejaz and the United Kingdom
- Treaty of Jeddah (1974), between the Kingdom of Saudi Arabia and the United Arab Emirates
- Treaty of Jeddah (2000), between the Kingdom of Saudi Arabia and the Republic of Yemen
- Treaty of Jeddah (2023), between the Rapid Support Forces and Sudanese Armed Forces of Sudan and the United States of America and Saudi Arabia.
