= Adrian Smith (architect) =

American architect (born 1944)

Adrian D. Smith
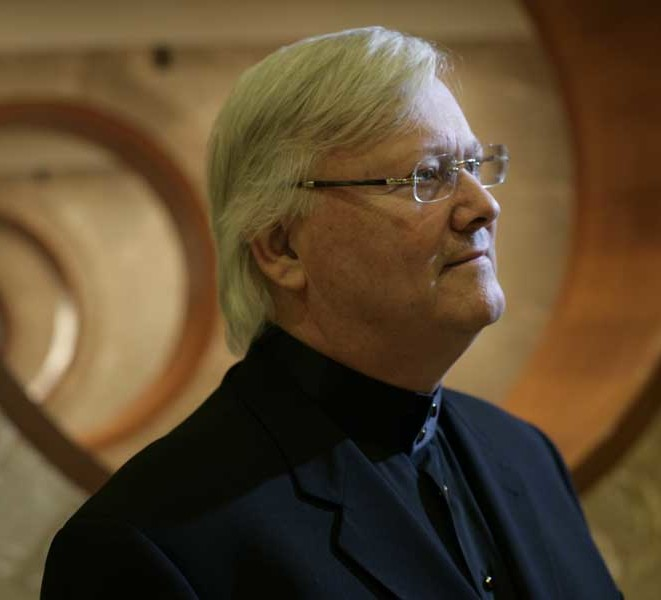
- Born: August 19, 1944 (age 82); Chicago, Illinois, U.S.
- Education: University of Illinois Chicago (BArch)
- Occupation: Architect
- Practice: Adrian Smith + Gordon Gill Architecture
- Buildings: Burj Khalifa; Central Park Tower; Jin Mao Tower; Trump International Hotel & Tower; Zifeng Tower
- Projects: Jeddah Tower

Adrian Devaun Smith (born August 19, 1944) is an American architect. He designed the world's tallest structure, Burj Khalifa, as well as the building projected to surpass it, the Jeddah Tower. A long-time principal of Skidmore, Owings & Merrill, he founded his own architectural partnership firm, Adrian Smith + Gordon Gill Architecture, in Chicago in 2006. Some of his other works include the Central Park Tower in New York City, Trump International Hotel & Tower in Chicago, Jin Mao Tower in Shanghai, and Zifeng Tower in Nanjing.

== Early life and education ==
Adrian Smith was born in Chicago in 1944. When he was four years old, his family moved to Southern California, where he grew up. His interest in drawing led his mother to suggest that he study architecture.

Smith attended Texas A&M University, pursuing a Bachelor of Architecture while being involved with the Corps of Cadets. However, he did not graduate and instead started working for Skidmore, Owings and Merrill (SOM) in 1967. He finished his education at the University of Illinois Chicago College of Architecture and Arts, graduating in 1969. In 2013, Smith was presented with an Honorary Doctorate of Letters degree from Texas A&M University.

== Career ==
Smith spent many years at Skidmore, Owings & Merrill (SOM) in Chicago, beginning in 1967. He served as a Design Partner from 1980 to 2003 and as a Consulting Design Partner from 2003 to 2006.

In 2006, he founded Adrian Smith + Gordon Gill Architecture (AS+GG), which is dedicated to designing high-performance, energy-efficient, and sustainable architecture on an international scale. In 2008, he co-founded the MEP firm PositivEnergy Practice (PEP), which specializes in environmental engineering for high-performance, energy-efficient architectural design.

== Contributions to architecture ==
The petal shape of the Burj Khalifa was a major architectural contribution by Smith. The shape of the Burj Khalifa was inspired by the spider lily flower. The three-petal shape reconfigures as the building height increases. The change in pattern along the height does not allow the flow pattern to organize. This confuses the wind and protects the building from the effects of vortex shedding. Smith was also credited with introducing the first large-scale commercial passive double-wall structure in the United States, located at 601 Congress Street in Boston in 2006.

== Recognition ==
Projects Smith designed have won over 125 awards, including 5 international awards, 9 National American Institute of Architects Awards, 35 State and Chicago AIA Awards, and 3 Urban Land Institute Awards for Excellence. He was the recipient of the CTBUH 2011 Lynn S. Beedle Lifetime Achievement Award. Smith's work at SOM has been featured in museums in the United States, South America, Europe, Asia, and the Middle East. He is a Senior Fellow of the Design Futures Council.

== Selected projects ==
The following is an abridged list of work Smith was primarily responsible for, as a partner at Skidmore, Owings & Merrill: or as Design Partner at Adrian Smith + Gordon Gill Architecture.

=== Completed ===
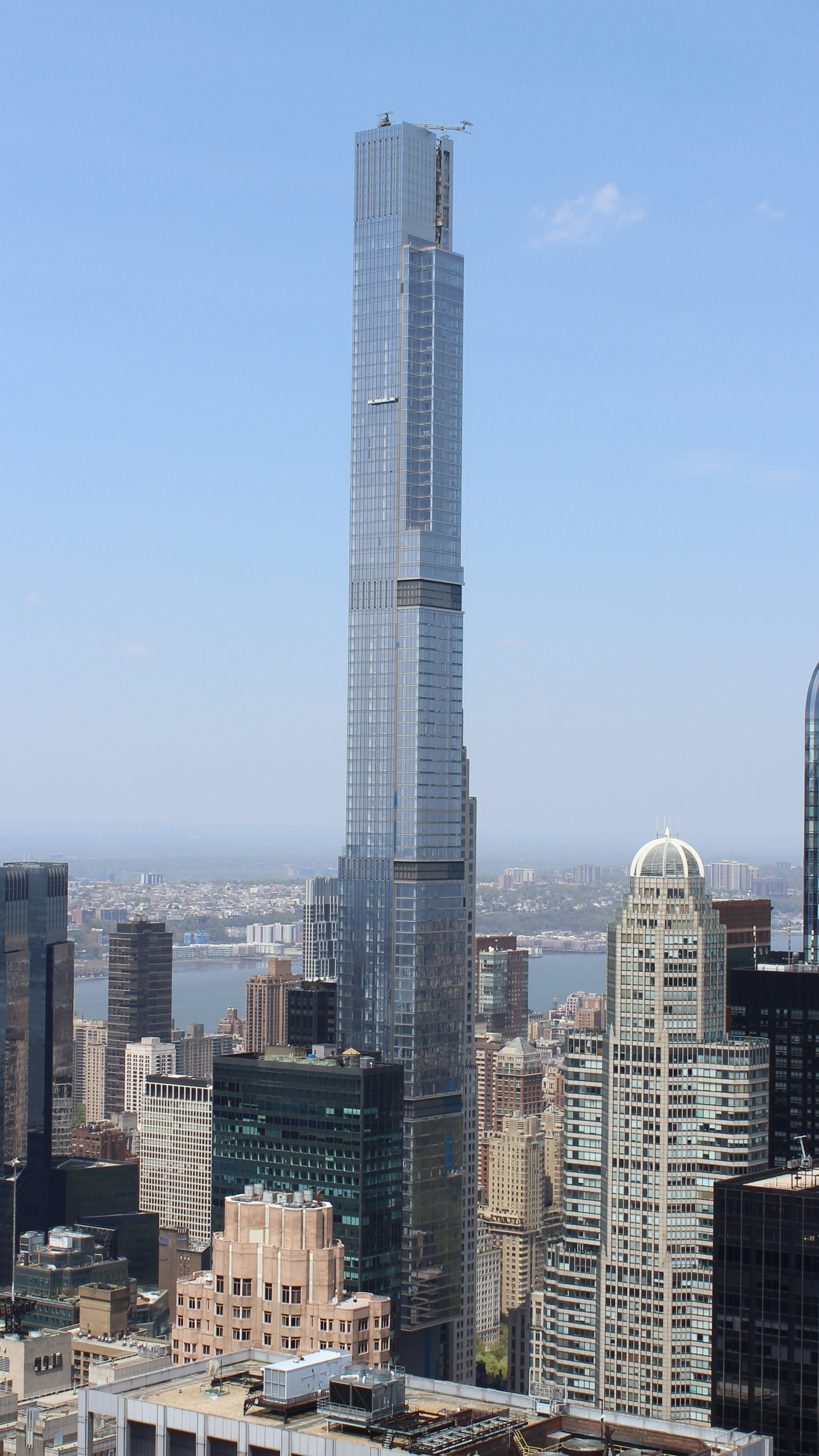
Central Park Tower in New York City.

The Burj Khalifa in Dubai.

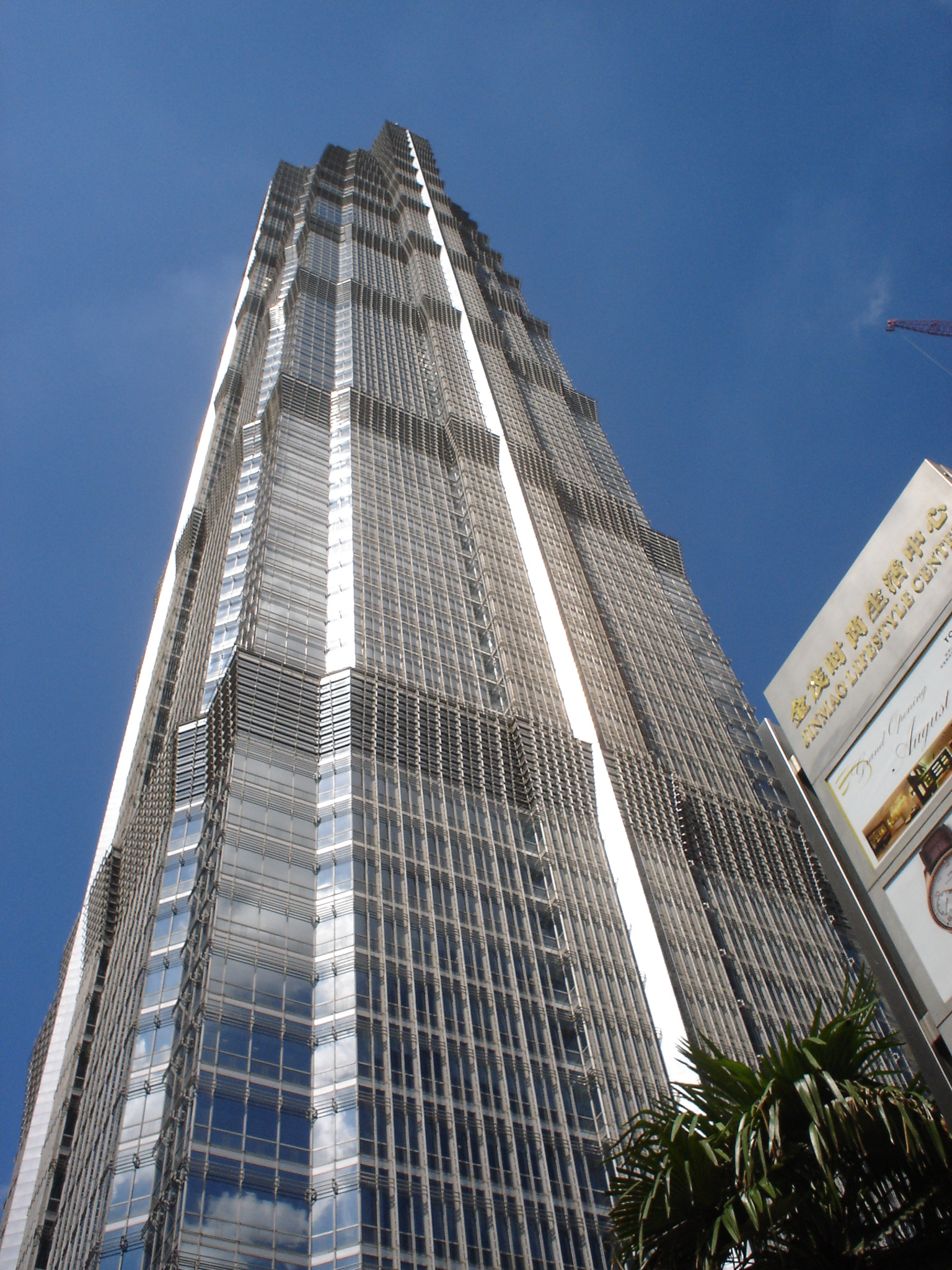
Jin Mao Tower in Shanghai

Building	Year	City	Country	Firm
830 Brickell	2023	Miami	United States	AS+GG
Wuhan Greenland Center	2022	Wuhan	China	AS+GG
Central Park Tower	2021	New York City	United States	AS+GG
Expo 2017	2017	Astana	Kazakhstan	AS+GG
Waldorf Astoria Beijing	2014	Beijing	China	AS+GG
FKI Tower	2013	Seoul	Korea	AS+GG
Chicago Central Area Decarbonization Plan	2011	Chicago	United States	AS+GG
Pearl River Tower	2011	Guangzhou	China	SOM
Burj Khalifa	2010	Dubai	United Arab Emirates	SOM
Trump International Hotel and Tower (Chicago)	2009	Chicago	United States	SOM
Broadgate Tower	2009	London	United Kingdom	SOM
Chemsunny Plaza	2008	Beijing	China	SOM
Jubilee Park Pavilion	2004	London	United Kingdom	SOM
Tower Palace III	2004	Seoul	Korea	SOM
Canary Wharf, International banking headquarters buildings: HQ1, DS1, DS3, DS4; FC2	1991–2004	London	United Kingdom	SOM
601 Congress Street, Manulife Financial	2003	Boston	United States	SOM
General Motors Renaissance Center	2003	Detroit	United States	SOM
Millennium Park and Millennium Park Master Plan	2002	Chicago	United States	SOM
Sede do BankBoston	2002	São Paulo	Brazil	SOM
Washington University Arts and Sciences Building	2000	St. Louis	United States	SOM
Jin Mao Tower	1998	Shanghai	China	SOM
Washington University Psychology Building	1996	St. Louis	United States	SOM
Summer of New Hope – Warren Blvd Project	1996	Chicago	United States	SOM
Aramco Headquarters Office Building	1993	Dhahran	Saudi Arabia	SOM
10 Ludgate Place	1992	London	United Kingdom	SOM
AT&T Corporate Center (currently Franklin Center)	1991	Chicago	United States	SOM
NBC Tower	1989	Chicago	United States	SOM
Rowes Wharf	1988	Boston	United States	SOM
Olympia Centre	1986	Chicago	United States	SOM
United Gulf Bank Building	1986	Manama	Bahrain	SOM
Banco de Occidente	1980	Guatemala City	Guatemala	SOM

=== Currently under construction ===
Project	Type	City	Country	Status	Completion Date	Firm
Chengdu Greenland Tower	Supertall	Chengdu	China	Construction	2026	AS+GG
Jeddah Tower	Megatall	Jeddah	Saudi Arabia	Construction	2028	AS+GG

=== Significant unbuilt projects ===
Building	City	Country	Firm
Masdar Headquarters	Abu Dhabi	United Arab Emirates	AS+GG
1 Dubai	Dubai	United Arab Emirates	AS+GG
7 South Dearborn	Chicago	United States	SOM
King Abdullah City	King Abdullah City	Saudi Arabia	SOM
Mitsui Headquarters Competition	Tokyo	Japan	SOM
Samsung Togok	Seoul	Korea	SOM
Xiamen Posts and Telecommunications Building	Xiamen	China	SOM

== Monographs ==
- Smith, Adrian, The Architecture of Adrian Smith, SOM: Toward a Sustainable Future, Images Publishing Group Pty Ltd, ISBN 1-86470-169-2
- Smith, Adrian, Pro Architect 24: Adrian D Smith, Archiworld Company Ltd, ISBN 89-87223-24-8
