= Battle of Jeddah =

Battle of Jeddah may refer to:

- Siege of Jeddah 1517, naval battle between the Ottoman Empire and the Portuguese Empire
- Siege of Jeddah (1520), naval battle between the Ottoman Empire and the Portuguese Empire
- Battle of Jeddah (1813), battle between the Ottoman Empire and the First Saudi State
- Battle of Jeddah (1925), battle between the Kingdom of Hejaz and the Third Saudi State
