= Peachtree Financial Tower =

Proposed skyscraper in Atlanta, Georgia

Coordinates: 33.785510°N 84.383555°W

Peachtree Financial Tower was a proposed skyscraper planned to be built in Atlanta, Georgia, in 2012. The height was increased and the location changed several times. At 119 stories and 1,450 ft (440 m) tall, the final version would have been the tallest building in the southern United States.
