= India Tower =

Proposed skyscraper in Mumbai, India

- Concept artwork showing the tower's proposed design.
- Interactive map of the India Tower area
- Former names: Park Hyatt Tower

General information
- Status: Cancelled in October 2015
- Type: Residential / hotel / office
- Location: Charni Road, Mumbai, India
- Coordinates: 18.950159°N 72.821348°E
- Construction started: 2010
- Construction stopped: 2011
- Estimated completion: TBA

Height
- Height: 707.5 m (2,321 ft)

Technical details
- Floor count: 126 (+5 below ground)
- Floor area: 150,000 m^{2} (1,600,000 sq ft)

Design and construction
- Architect: Foster and Partners
- Developer: Dynamix Balwas Realty

India Tower (previously known as the Park Hyatt Tower; also referred to as the Dynamix Balwas Tower or DB Tower) is an unbuilt 126-story, 707.5 m (2,321 ft) megatall skyscraper in Mumbai, India. Originally planned for completion in 2016, construction was put on hold in May 2011 due to disputes between the developers and Mumbai's civic authorities, and later cancelled in 2015.

As of 2023, there have been no updates regarding the construction of the building, rendering it a significant example of stalled megaprojects in Mumbai.

== History ==
The Dynamix Balwas Group proposed the tower project in 2008 as Park Hyatt Tower, initially designed as an 85-story structure with a height of 301.1 m (988 ft). Following its initial cancellation, the project was revived in 2010 with a redesigned and larger plan.

In January 2010, the Brihanmumbai Municipal Corporation approved construction for the site located at Charni Road in Girgaon, southern Mumbai, just north of the city's historical CBD (Central Business District). Site preparation commenced in late 2010, but a stop-work order was issued in May 2011 due to payment disputes. Ultimately, the project was officially cancelled on 16 October 2015 due to these ongoing issues and lack of compliance with regulatory requirements.

The land was subsequently acquired by Prestige Group and, in 2025, they began construction of the Ocean Towers project.

== See also ==
- Azerbaijan Tower
- Legacy Tower
- Suzhou Zhongnan Center
- Wuhan Greenland Center
- Goldin Finance 117
- Baoneng Shenyang Global Financial Center
- World One
