= Adrian Smith + Gordon Gill Architecture =

American architecture and design firm

Coordinates: 41°52′51.9″N 87°37′44.8″W

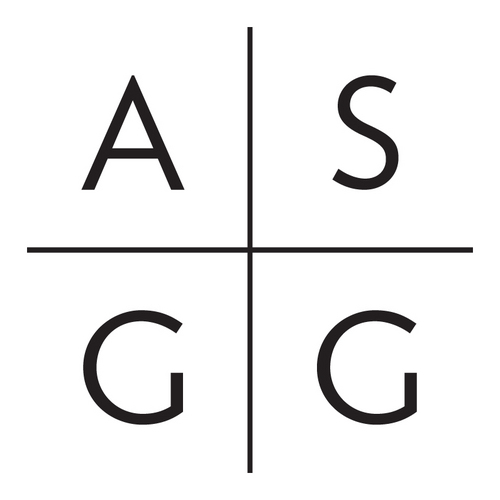

Practice information
- Key architects: Adrian Smith; Gordon Gill; Robert Forest
- Founded: November 1, 2006
- Location: Chicago, Illinois

Significant works and honors
- Buildings: Broadgate Tower; Burj Khalifa; Nanjing Greenland Financial Center; Trump International Hotel and Tower
- Projects: 1 Dubai; Chicago Central Area Decarbonization Plan; Jeddah Tower; Wuhan Greenland Center

Website
- smithgill.com

Adrian Smith + Gordon Gill Architecture (AS+GG) is an American architecture and urban design firm based in Chicago, Illinois, Illinois, United States.

The company engages in the design and development of energy-efficient and sustainable architecture. AS+GG designs buildings, cities, masterplans and components of these, for an international clientele, with projects located throughout the world. The primary uses of these designs are civic, commercial, cultural, hospitality, residential and mixed-use. AS+GG also specializes in supertall skyscrapers, such as the Jeddah Tower, which will overtake the Burj Khalifa as the world's tallest building when completed.

== History ==
AS+GG was founded in Chicago in 2006 by Adrian Smith, Gordon Gill, and Robert Forest after they left the Chicago office of Skidmore, Owings and Merrill LLP (SOM). Taking their experience on large, mixed-use projects, AS+GG focuses on the design of high-performance, energy-efficient, and sustainable architecture on an international scale. "We're now trying to design a building as a vehicle, or a vessel, that uses less energy and also mines the free energy that's available," as Smith explained in an interview with architectural historian Judith Dupré, "and that's creating a new aesthetic for us."

Adrian Smith's departure from SOM was widely reported. At the time of his departure, Smith had several projects still under construction that were designed while at SOM including: Burj Khalifa, Dubai, UAE, Broadgate Tower, London, England, the UK and Trump International Hotel and Tower, Chicago, and with Gordon Gill and Robert Forest: Nanjing Greenland Financial Center, Nanjing, China. Gordon, while at SOM, designed the award-winning Virginia Beach Convention Center, Virginia Beach, Virginia. He also designed the Pearl River Tower, Guangzhou, China with Robert also working on the project.

Though the start-up of their firm appears to have had some rough moments (Smith had to pay $250,000 of salaries out of his own pocket to cover one rough spot), they have been commissioned for at least one ground-breaking building. Adrian Smith + Gordon Gill Architecture has been chosen over SOM, Norman Foster, Atkins, and Helmut Jahn to design and build the Headquarters of Masdar City, a zero-energy, zero carbon, zero waste city in the United Arab Emirates.

Adrian Smith + Gordon Gill Architecture (AS+GG) has grown substantially since its inception in November 2006 with only 7 employees. At the end of one year, the firm employed 35. As of April 2008 there were over 70 employees at AS+GG., and in December 2008 the staff totals were reported as 185. The firm peaked around 200 employees in 2009 when they had to lay off forty employees on February 28 and an additional 40 on March 6 of that year. The firm has hired other notable designers from top Chicago firms but have continued to have layoffs each year beginning in 2008.

The company competes with Atkins, Foster + Partners, Kohn Pedersen Fox and Skidmore Owings & Merrill.

== Significant projects ==
=== 1 Dubai ===
1 Dubai, is a three-tower complex in Dubai and part of the Jumeirah Garden City by Meraas Development. Each tower of the design is at least 1,969 feet (600 meters) tall. In 2008, AS+GG beat out Skidmore, Owings & Merrill, Pelli Clarke Pelli Architects, Kohn Pedersen Fox Associates, and Atkins with the massive 13,000,000-square-foot (1,200,00 sm) design of three towers connected by sky bridges.

=== Central Park Tower ===
Residential supertall skyscraper on Billionaire's Row in Midtown Manhattan. Currently the second-tallest building in New York City, it attracted controversy due to the purchase of air rights to obtain greater height and an easement to allow it to extend over the adjacent historic Art Students League of New York building.

=== Chicago Central Area Decarbonization Plan ===
This award-winning plan seeks to reduce the environmental impact and carbon emissions of downtown Chicago and to improve the overall quality of life of the city's urban environment. The plan is described as a process for maintaining the economic and cultural vitality of the urban core from an energy and carbon perspective. The continued viability of cities and urban living is a core principle in the idea that population growth can continue without its negative impact to the environment becoming detrimental to the planet in the form of global warming.

=== EXPO 2017 in Astana ===
AS+GG designed a 173-hectare site for EXPO 2017 that was held from June 10 to September 10, 2017, in Astana, Kazakhstan. The main theme of the EXPO was "Future Energy", which was reflected in the concept of AS+GG's futuristic design featuring a glass globe sat atop an undulating glazed podium.

=== Jeddah Tower ===
At over 3,280 feet (1,000 meters) tall with a total construction area of 530,000 square meters (5.7 million square feet), Jeddah Tower will be the centerpiece and first construction phase of the $20 billion Jeddah Economic City development in Jeddah, Saudi Arabia, near the Red Sea. In 2011, AS+GG won an international design competition against finalists Skidmore, Owings & Merrill, Pelli Clarke Pelli Architects, Kohn Pedersen Fox Associates, Foster + Partners, and Pickard Chilton.

=== Wuhan Greenland Center ===
Completed in 2022, Wuhan Greenland Center is 502 meters (1,647 feet) tall. The tower in Wuhan, China, contains offices, luxury apartments and condominiums, a five-star hotel, and a private club with views at the tower's penthouse level. Wuhan Greenland Center also features a streamlined form that combines three key shaping concepts—a tapered body, softly rounded corners and a domed top—to reduce wind resistance and vortex action that builds up around supertall towers.

== See also ==
- Adrian Smith
- Robert Forest
- Jeddah Tower
- Burj Khalifa
- Pearl River Tower
- Nanjing Greenland
