= Jeddah Tower =

Skyscraper in Jeddah, Saudi Arabia

- برج جدة
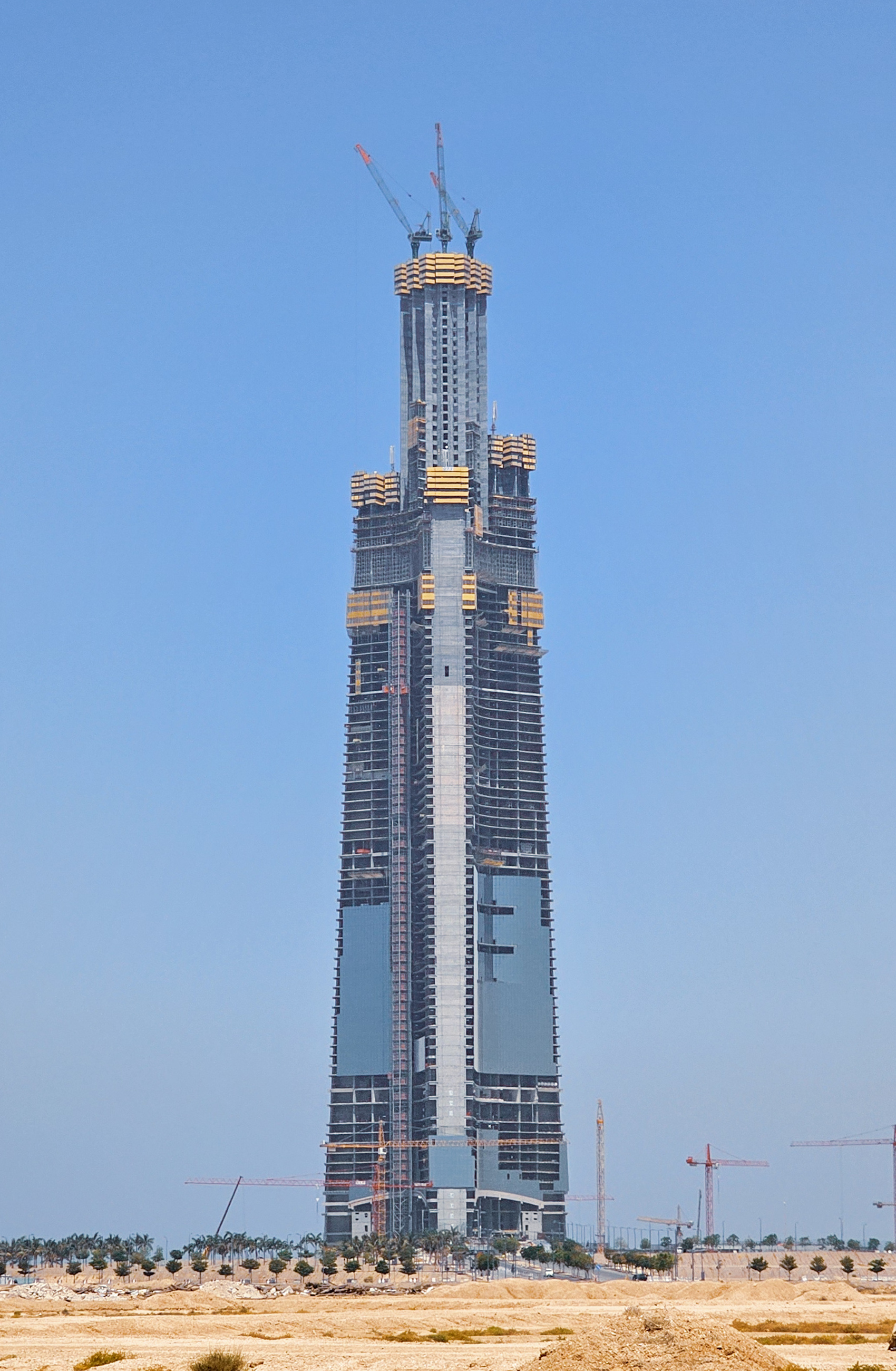
- Jeddah Tower in May 2026, after construction had reached the 100th floor

General information
- Status: Under construction
- Type: Mixed-use
- Architectural style: Neo-futurism
- Location: Jeddah, Mecca Province, Saudi Arabia
- Coordinates: 21°44′02.4″N 39°04′58.5″E
- Construction started: 1 April 2013; 13 years ago
- Estimated completion: August 2028; 1 year's time
- Cost: US$1.2 billion
- Owner: Kingdom Holding Company
- Operator: CBRE Group

Height
- Architectural: At least 1,008 m (3,307 ft)
- Roof: At least 1,008 m (3,307 ft)
- Top floor: 638 m (2,093 ft)
- Observatory: 630 and 638 m (2,067 and 2,093 ft) (sky terrace at 630 m (2,067 ft))

Technical details
- Structural system: Reinforced concrete and steel, all-glass facade
- Floor count: 167 floors; 252 levels
- Floor area: 243,866 m^{2} (2,624,950 sq ft)
- Lifts/elevators: 57 (50 single-decked, 7 double-decked) made by Kone + 1 workmen's lift

Design and construction
- Architect: Adrian Smith
- Architecture firm: Adrian Smith + Gordon Gill Architecture
- Developer: Jeddah Economic Company
- Engineer: Langan International (sub-grade and transportation planning)
- Structural engineer: Thornton Tomasetti
- Main contractor: Saudi Binladin Group

Jeddah Tower (Note: Arabic: برج جدة (romanized: Burj Jiddah), formerly known as the Kingdom Tower (2011–2015).) is a megatall skyscraper currently under construction in Jeddah, Saudi Arabia. Located in the north of the city, it is the centrepiece of the Jeddah Economic City project. Jeddah Tower is planned to be the first 1-kilometre-tall (1,000 m; 3,300 ft) building and, upon completion, would become the world's tallest building or structure, standing at least 180 metres (590 ft) taller than the Burj Khalifa. As of November 2026, construction has surpassed the 120th floor and reached a height over 482 metres (1,581 ft).

== Overview ==
Designed by Adrian Smith and Gordon Gill of AS+GG Architecture, Jeddah Tower incorporates numerous unique structural and aesthetic features. The creator and leader of the project is Saudi Arabian prince Al-Waleed bin Talal, who is the chairman of Kingdom Holding Company (KHC). KHC is a partner in the Jeddah Economic Company (JEC), which was formed in 2009 for the development of Jeddah Tower and City.

Construction progress was halted in January 2018, when building owner JEC stopped structural concrete work. At the time, approximately one third of the tower had been completed. The halt resulted from labor issues with a contractor following the 2017–2019 Saudi Arabian purge and the COVID-19 pandemic. In September 2023, a new request for proposals was issued for completion of the delayed project. After nearly five years of inactivity, development work resumed in 2023. Construction restarted in January 2025, and the building is expected to be completed around mid-2028.

== Site ==
Jeddah Tower's 50-hectare (120-acre) plot, along with surrounding buildings, will be the first of a three-phase Jeddah Economic City development. The three-phase project was proposed for a large area of undeveloped waterfront land with an area of 5.2 square kilometres (2.0 sq mi). The area is located roughly 20 kilometres (12 mi) north of the port city of Jeddah. Jeddah Economic City was designed by HOK Architects, and is estimated to cost at least SR75billion (US$20billion) and take around ten years to build.

The development is envisioned to grow into a new district of Jeddah. The second phase of the project will be the infrastructure development needed to support the city, and the third phase has not yet been revealed.

The focal point of the development and Jeddah Tower's primary use will be to house a Four Seasons hotel, Four Seasons short-rental apartments, Class A office space, and luxury condominiums. The tower will also have the world's highest observation deck. Although the Jeddah Economic City plot is nearly isolated from the current urban core of Jeddah, no land tracts of such size were available closer to the city. Northward is generally considered the direction in which the city will spread in the future.

== Construction history ==
In May 2008, soil testing in the area cast doubt over whether the proposed location could support a skyscraper of the proposed one-mile (1,600 metres, 5,250 ft) height, and MEED reported that the project had been scaled back, making it "up to 500 metres (1,640 ft) shorter". Work on the foundation was scheduled to begin towards the end of 2012. Statements that construction would soon begin were made starting in 2008. In August 2011, the start of construction was slated as "no later than December". This meant the tower was expected to be completed in 2017, though at that time it was also possible that it could still have been completed by the date the media continued to publish, which was the prior estimate of late 2016. Only if construction had begun promptly and gone smoothly could completion in late 2016 have been achieved.

Reports in 2009 suggested that the project had been put on hold due to the 2008 financial crisis and that Bechtel (the initial engineering firm for this project) was "in the process of ending its involvement with the project". Kingdom Holding Company quickly criticized the news reports, insisting that the project had not been shelved.

=== Architect selected ===
In March 2010, Adrian Smith + Gordon Gill Architecture (AS + GG) was selected as the preliminary architect (though the firm denies involvement in the earlier, mile-high design). Later, when the proposal was more serious, they won a design competition between eight leading architectural firms, including Kohn Pedersen Fox, Pickard Chilton, Pelli Clarke Pelli, and Foster + Partners, as well as the firm Smith formerly worked for, Skidmore, Owings and Merrill, which was the final competitor in the competition before AS + GG was chosen. In addition to Burj Khalifa, Adrian Smith has designed several other recent towers; the Zifeng Tower in Nanjing, China, the Trump International Hotel & Tower in Chicago, and the Jin Mao Tower in Shanghai, as well as the Pearl River Tower in Guangzhou, China. The four buildings are all among the forty tallest in the world. Furthermore, the Pearl River Tower is a unique tower that was originally designed to use zero net energy by drawing all its needed power from wind, sunlight, and geothermal mass, though this design goal was not fully achieved.

In October 2010, the owners (Kingdom Holding Company) signed a development agreement with Emaar Properties PJSC. The final height of the building was questionable, but it was still listed to be over 1 kilometre. Kingdom Holding said construction was progressing.

Designs for the foundation were in place by early August 2011 and the contract for the piling was tendered. On 16 August 2011, Langan International officially announced their involvement and that the foundation and piling had to be uniquely designed to overcome subsurface issues such as soft bedrock and porous coral rock, which normally could not support a skyscraper without settling. The foundation is similar to that of the Burj Khalifa, but larger; it is expected to average around 4.5 m (15 ft) deep with a concrete pad of area around 7,500 m^{2} (81,000 ft^{2}). The concrete must have low permeability to keep out corrosive salt water from the Red Sea. Its depth and size are also considered to be an indicator of what the tower's final height will be. The piles will be up to 200 m (660 ft) deep and the pad over 90 m (300 ft) across, yet the building, which will weigh over 900,000 tonnes (890,000 long tons; 990,000 short tons), is expected to settle. The idea is that it settles evenly enough so that the building does not tip or put undue stress on the superstructure. Computer modelling programmes performed tests at the site to confirm that the foundation design would work. A later design for the foundation, to be constructed by Bauer in 2013, calls for 270 bored piles up to 110 m (360 ft) deep, which have to be installed into the difficult ground conditions. Some materials needed for the structure are 500,000 m^{3} (18,000,000 cu ft) of concrete and 80,000 t (79,000 long tons; 88,000 short tons) of steel.

=== Approvals ===
In March and April 2011, several news agencies reported that the Mile-High Tower design had been approved at that height and that the building would cost almost US$30billion (SR112.5billion). This design was going to be drastically larger than the current design, with a floor area of 3,530,316 m^{2} (38,000,000 ft^{2}), and would have used futuristic wind-aversion and energy-producing technology for sustainability. It and the surrounding city would have had the ability to accommodate 80,000 residents and one million visitors, according to RIA Novosti.

On 2 August 2011, it was publicly announced by Kingdom Holding, the investment company, that a contract had been signed by Saudi Binladin Group (SBG), that construction was going to start soon, and that the tower was expected to take 63 months to complete. While the official construction estimate was (at the time) expected to take five years and three months (63 months), others calculated that it will take over seven years, based on the duration of Burj Khalifa's construction.

=== Contractors selected ===
In early August 2011, the Saudi Binladin Group was chosen as the main construction contractor with the signing of an SR4.6billion (US$1.23 billion) contract, which is less than it cost to build the Burj Khalifa (US$1.5billion). New renderings were revealed, and on 2 August it was widely reported that the project was a go at the kilometre (3,300 foot) height^{[A]} with a building area of 530,000 square metres (5,700,000 ft^{2}),^{[B]} and will take 63 months to complete. The announcement of the main construction contract signing caused Kingdom Holding Company's stock to jump 3.2% in one day, in addition to KHC already having reported a 21% rise in second-quarter net profit. Gordon Gill and Adrian Smith were also confirmed as the architect. The landscaping contract for the Jeddah Tower was awarded to Landtech Designs, a US-based company, which was tasked with irrigating 3.4 hectares (8.5 acres) of green space, to be collected through rainwater.

Financing for the Jeddah Tower was complete by September 2012; Talal Al Maiman, chief executive officer and managing director of Kingdom Real Estate Development Co., said it had taken 20 months to gather all the investors. The next month, Kingdom Holding awarded contracts totalling $98 million, and Subul Development Company paid $66.5 million for some land on the site. The Kingdom Riyadh Land project, a mixed-use commercial and residential development, will generate more than $5.33 billion of total investment and will house up to 75,000 people. The final master plan contract was awarded to Omrania & Associates and Barton Willmore. Bauer, a German Foundations equipment manufacturer and contractor, was awarded a $32 million contract to support the initial phases of construction of the Jeddah Tower, including the installation of 270 bored piles measuring 1.5 and 1.8 metres (4 ft 11 in and 5 ft 11 in) in diameter.

The Jeddah Economic Company (JEC) appointed the joint venture of EC Harris and Mace to manage the project in early 2013. The Saudi Water Company also signed a 2.2 billion-riyal ($587 million), 25-year deal with JEC to supply 156,000 cubic metres (5,500,000 cu ft)of treated and drinking water per day.

=== Construction begins and delays ===
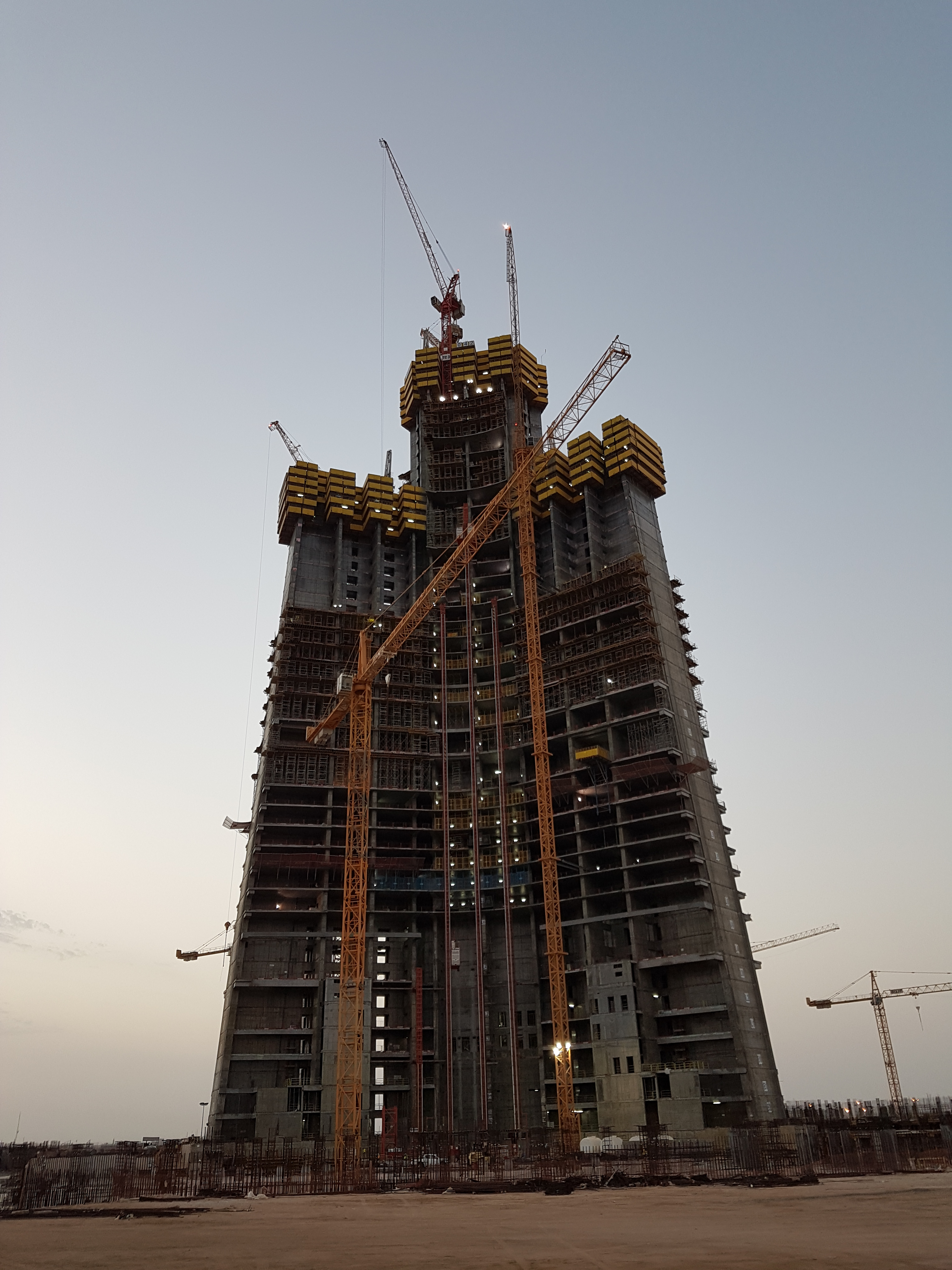
The tower under construction in 2016

Construction started on 1 April 2013. The pilings were completed that December, allowing above-ground construction to commence in September 2014.

In late 2017, the owner of Kingdom Holding Co, which owns 33% of the tower, and the chairman of the Saudi Binladen Group, which owns 17% and is the primary contractor, were both arrested as part of the 2017 Saudi Arabian purge. Construction of the tower continued, although some senior managers at Kingdom Holding were redirected to other projects. In February 2018, Mounib Hammoud, CEO of Jeddah Economic City, said that construction was continuing and that they hoped to open the tower by 2020. The walls had risen to 248 m (814 ft) by October, with the core reaching 60 storeys; at the end of the year, the reported height was 252 m (827 ft).

Building owner JEC halted structural concrete work in January 2018, with the tower about one-third completed, due to labour issues with a contractor following the Saudi Arabian purge. As a result, work on the tower became stalled (after it reached its 63rd floor in 2018). Two months later, Kingdom Holding Company signed a deal with Orange Business Services to provide information and communication technology (ICT) infrastructure to Jeddah Tower, and construction resumed after the delay. Work was stalled once again in 2020 due to the COVID-19 pandemic, which ultimately led to a years-long delay.

=== Restart ===
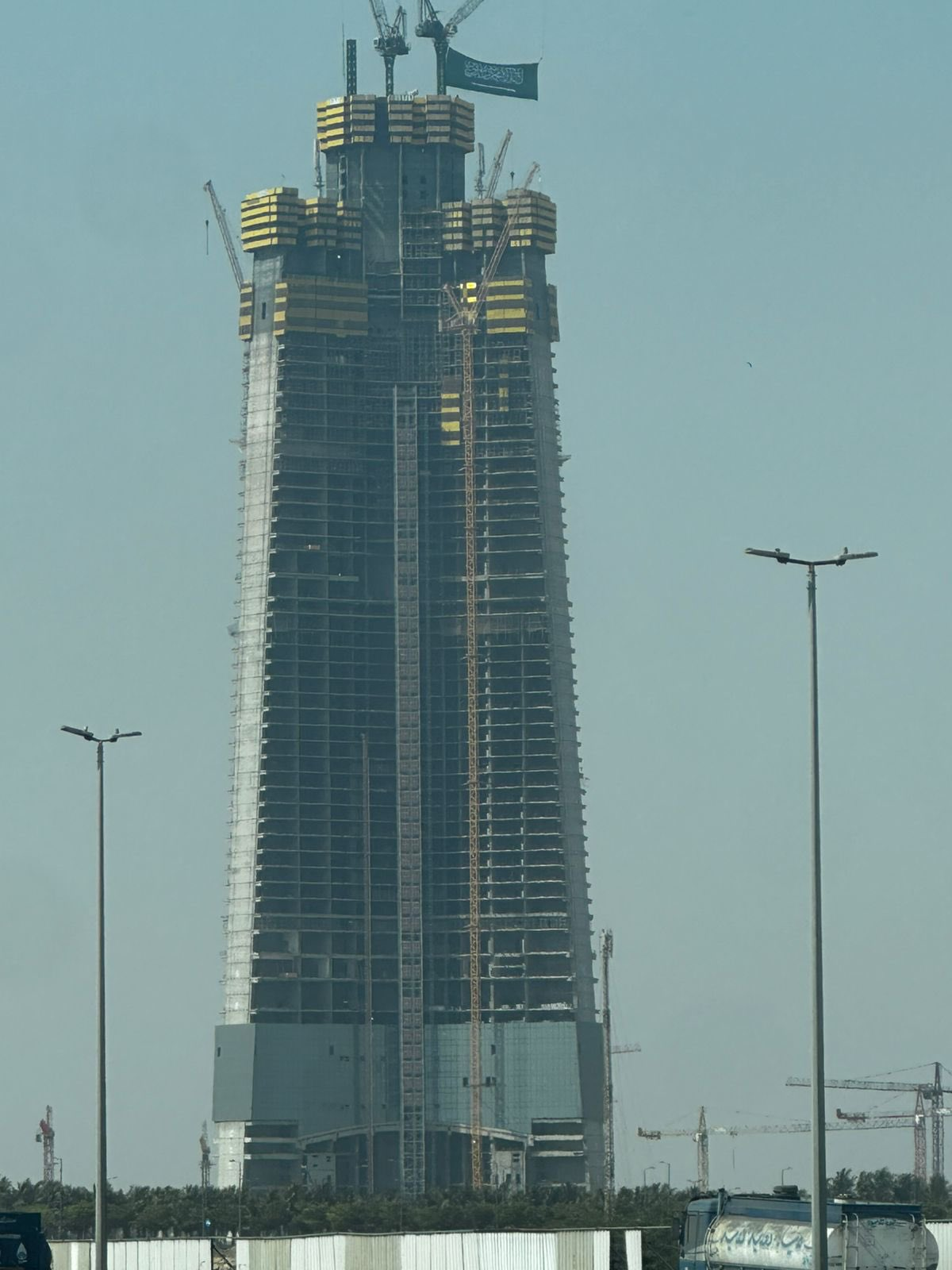
Jeddah Tower under construction in September 2025

In September 2023, the Middle East Economic Digest (MEED) reported that Jeddah Economic City had restarted the project and a request for proposals had been issued for a contract to complete the construction of the tower, which came after construction faced a three-and-a-half-year hiatus. Fourteen construction contractors from the region, Europe, and China were given three months to prepare their bids. In May 2024, the architect confirmed that construction would resume and it was estimated that the tower would be topped out in two years. Construction officially restarted in January 2025. Work progressed at a relatively slow rate due to the observation of Ramadan in Saudi Arabia, but soon sped up after the festivities with Jeddah Tower reaching its 66th floor by April 2025. During the restarted construction, a new crane was installed on the core part of the tower in order to accelerate the construction. By January 2026, work had reached the 80th floor, and on 14 April 2026, the tower reached its 100th floor. In October 2026, the tower reached 113 floors, surpassing 472 metres (1,549 ft), eclipsing the height of Central Park Tower, the highest building by roof height in the western hemisphere.

== Development team ==
The primary designer of Jeddah Tower is Chicago-based architect Adrian Smith of Adrian Smith + Gordon Gill Architecture (AS + GG), the same architect who designed the Burj Khalifa while at Skidmore, Owings & Merrill (SOM), where he worked for almost 40 years. The development of the tower is being managed by Emaar Properties PJSC. Thornton Tomasetti is the structural engineering firm, and Environmental Systems Design, Inc. (ESD) is a part of the AS + GG design team that serves as the building services engineering consultants. The main construction firm, Saudi Binladin Group (SBG), is partly owned by the family of Osama bin Laden; Adrian Smith emphasized the company's size and experience make it suitable for large projects.

Besix Group (Belgian Six Construct), which constructed the Burj Khalifa, was previously considered for the contract, but did not win, partially because SBG invested in Jeddah Economic Company (JEC), contributing SR1.5 billion (US$400 million) towards the development of the project. Besix admitted in 2010 that they expected Binladin Group to win the contract. Jeddah Economic Company is a closed joint stock company (PJSC) formed in 2009 as a financial entity for Jeddah Tower and Jeddah Economic City. It is made up primarily of financiers (stakeholders) Kingdom Holding Company (33.35%), Abrar Holding Company (33.35%), which is owned by Samaual Bakhsh and businessman Abdulrahman Hassan Sharbatly (16.67%), as well as SBG (16.63%). JEC's assets have a book value of nearly SR9 billion, broken down between a land bank of over 5,300,000 m^{2} (57,048,725 ft^{2}) (the Jeddah Economic City plot) with a value of SR7.3 billion that will be used as collateral to attain bank loans, and SR1.5 billion in cash. Kingdom Holding is an investment company founded in 1980 and 95% owned by Al-Waleed bin Talal that has assets valued at over $25 billion, with interests in many major companies such as Walt Disney, PepsiCo, Kodak, Apple, Hewlett-Packard, Motorola, Time Warner, News Corporation, Pinnacle Infotech Solutions, and Citigroup, as well as real estate in London through its Songbird Estates division.

== Architecture ==
2011 rendering of the tower's design

The building has been designed to a height of at least 1,000 metres (3,281 ft) (the exact height is being kept private while in development, similar to the Burj Khalifa).^{[A]} At over one kilometre, Jeddah Tower would be the tallest building or structure in the world, standing 180 m (591 ft) taller than the Burj Khalifa in Dubai, United Arab Emirates.

=== Structural design ===
The Jeddah Tower uses a bearing wall structural system in reinforced concrete based on a buttressed core configuration, refined from the system developed for the Burj Khalifa. The structure consists of a closed triangular central core with intersecting concrete walls radiating outward to form three wings that buttress the core and provide lateral stiffness under wind loading. Unlike many other supertall buildings, the structural concept does not rely on outrigger trusses or perimeter mega-columns, with lateral forces resisted primarily through the integrated wall system.

The concept and its antecedents can be traced to earlier concrete tower forms, including three-legged structures such as the CN Tower in Toronto, completed in 1976. As the tower rises, the wings progressively taper, with inclined perimeter walls that contribute to aerodynamic stability and reduced wind induced forces. Above the occupied levels, the structure transitions into a predominantly closed wall spire with a different internal layout.

=== Foundations ===
The tower is supported by a piled raft foundation system designed to address the challenging coastal geotechnical conditions of the site near the Red Sea. The subsurface profile includes reef limestone with cavities and weakly consolidated sandstone and gravel layers extending to significant depths.

The foundation comprises 270 bored reinforced concrete piles, 1.5 to 1.8 m (4 ft 11 in to 5 ft 11 in) in diameter and ranging from 45 to 105 m (148 to 344 ft) in length, with the deepest piles located beneath the central core. The piles are connected by a reinforced concrete raft slab varying in thickness from approximately 4.5 m (15 ft) in the central area to 5.0 m (16 ft 5 in) beneath the three wings of the tower.

The works involved approximately 38,000 m^{3} (1,300,000 cu ft) of concrete in the piles and about 18,260 m^{3} (645,000 cu ft) in the raft, with roughly 4,400 tonnes of reinforcement steel in the piles and 3,650 tonnes in the raft. The piled raft system was selected for both axial capacity and control of long term and differential settlement for a structure exceeding 1 km (0.62 mi) in height.

Cavities encountered in the reef limestone were treated by filling the boreholes with a sand cement mix to ensure adequate bearing and continuity. Due to the aggressive soil environment, a cathodic protection system was installed to prevent corrosion, with electrical continuity ensured throughout the reinforcement in both piles and raft.

=== Tuned mass dampers ===
The Jeddah Tower incorporates an auxiliary tuned mass damping system within the spire to control wind-induced motion at extreme elevations. Wind-tunnel testing and sensitivity studies indicated that the main tower structure is robust with respect to adverse wind effects and is predicted to remain within acceptable comfort criteria for occupants without the need for supplemental damping. However, while the spire is uninhabited, predicted wind-induced accelerations increase significantly toward the upper portions of the spire due to the non-linear behavior of the fundamental mode shape, requiring specific mitigation measures.

To address this condition, an auxiliary two-staged damping system was specified to limit motion within the spire only. According to the project description, the system consists of two tuned mass damper units with approximate masses of 870 tonnes and 260 tonnes, positioned at levels 206 (826 m) and 218 (874 m), respectively. The system is designed to reduce wind-induced movements in the spire by approximately 30 percent.

=== Building systems ===
Lessons from Burj Khalifa informed Jeddah Tower's structural design and planning of mechanical, electrical, and plumbing (MEP) systems, while meeting local regulations and international building codes. Adrian Smith noted that practical considerations are often a greater challenge than structural durability, with the tower's form primarily based on intended functions. Orange Group is responsible for the building's information and communications systems. ESD provides mechanical, plumbing, electrical, and fire protection engineering, as well as teledata, audio/visual, security, and acoustics systems. Langan International handles geotechnical engineering and some ground-level site work including transportation engineering and parking, including the proposed underground 3,000–4,700 car garage near the tower.

=== Vertical transportation ===
The elevator system will be located within the central structural core of the tower and will comprise approximately 8.025 kilometres of elevator hoistways. It will include 57 elevators, including 7 double-deck units, and 8 escalators, all supplied by the Finnish company Kone; vertical circulation is organized through three sky lobbies, segmenting elevator service through transfer levels rather than a single continuous run, with elevator efficiency and sky lobbies addressing vertical transportation challenges by allowing transfers without overloading individual elevators.

The elevator system is designed to limit cable weight for efficiency.

The tower will feature the world's highest observation deck, served by two dedicated high-speed shuttle elevators operating directly from ground level to the highest occupied floor. These shuttles will travel at speeds of up to 10 metres per second (36.0 km/h; 22.4 mph) in both directions, covering a vertical distance of approximately 640 metres, with a travel time of about 66 seconds from door close to door open.

To overcome the weight limitations of conventional steel hoisting ropes used in earlier supertall buildings, the observatory shuttle elevators will use KONE UltraRope, a carbon-fiber-based hoisting technology with a rectangular profile. During the design of the Burj Khalifa, practical limits of conventional steel ropes were reached at travel distances of around 500 metres due to rope self-weight. UltraRope is significantly lighter than traditional steel cables and is designed to support extreme travel distances exceeding one kilometre and very high operating speeds, beyond 20 metres per second.

In addition, a dedicated workmen's lift will serve multiple technical levels within the spire, operating between level 169 (680 m) and level 230 (922 m).

Second proposed design of the sky terrace

Third proposed design of the sky terrace

=== Economic viability ===
The building will include retail and other amenities to operate as a semi-self-sustaining "vertical city". The estimated construction cost of US$1.23 billion is lower than Burj Khalifa's US$1.5 billion, partly due to lower labor costs and three-shift construction.

The 23 hectares (57 acres) area around the tower will include public space, a shopping mall, and residential and commercial developments, forming the Jeddah Tower Water Front District, with the tower site covering 50 ha (120 acres). Like other iconic skyscrapers, the tower is intended to be symbolic and to raise surrounding land values rather than its own profitability. Adrian Smith said the design "evokes a bundle of leaves shooting up from the ground; a burst of new life that heralds more growth all around it." The tower and Jeddah Economic City are designed to be interdependent. Talal Al Maiman, board member of Jeddah Economic Company, said the tower will significantly increase the value of surrounding properties.

The development model follows Burj Khalifa, where surrounding malls, hotels, and condominiums in Downtown Dubai generated the majority of project revenue, while the tower itself had minimal profit. In 2011, consultancy EC Harris reported Saudi Arabia is the least expensive Middle Eastern country for construction, cheaper than Bahrain and United Arab Emirates. The tower's proximity to King Abdulaziz International Airport may affect airspace. Experts noted that buildings over one kilometre, including those approaching two kilometres (6,600 feet), are technically feasible but present practical and sustainability challenges.

== Impact ==
Saudi Arabia has experienced increased demand in its real estate market, accompanied by rising property prices, which some analysts have described as indicative of a potential real estate bubble. These trends have been linked to rapid population growth and a limited supply of housing. Demand has also extended to high-end residential developments, including projects such as the Jeddah Tower. In response to housing shortages, the Saudi government announced plans to invest US$67 billion (SR251 billion) in the construction of approximately 500,000 homes nationwide as part of broader economic and social development initiatives. Saudi officials have stated that roughly 900 new housing units per day are required to meet the needs of the growing population, which has nearly quadrupled over the past four decades.

The Jeddah Tower is planned as a central component of the wider Jeddah Economic City development. In parallel, multiple infrastructure and urban redevelopment projects have been undertaken or proposed across Saudi Arabia. Among these is the US$7.2 billion (SR27.1 billion) expansion of King Abdulaziz International Airport, which is intended to support increased capacity and regional development.

According to a representative from Standard Chartered, which invested US$75 million in the Saudi Binladin Group, Saudi Arabia is expected to allocate more than US$400 billion (SR1.5 trillion) toward infrastructure projects over several years. Analysis by Citigroup reported that approximately US$220 billion in development spending, representing 36 percent of total construction expenditure in the Middle East and North Africa, could directly or indirectly affect the Jeddah Tower project. The Jeddah Tower and its surrounding development have also been presented by planners as an example of environmentally conscious construction, incorporating modern technologies aimed at reducing their overall carbon footprint relative to projected occupancy levels.

=== Reception ===
Developers have suggested that large-scale landmark developments and the international visibility associated with constructing the world's tallest building could contribute to gentrification and increased foreign interest in the country. Architect Adrian Smith, the tower's designer, described the project as a symbol of Saudi Arabia's economic ambitions and technological capabilities. In contrast, Bob Sinn, a principal engineer at Thornton Tomasetti, noted that the primary difficulties associated with constructing buildings of extreme height are often related to practical and operational considerations rather than structural feasibility alone.

Talal Al Maiman, a board member of both Kingdom Holding Company and Jeddah Economic Company, stated that the tower is intended to function as both an economic catalyst and a symbolic representation of the kingdom's position in the global economy. Businessman Al-Waleed bin Talal characterized the development as a political and economic statement emphasizing domestic investment priorities.

== Floor plan ==
It is estimated that the Jeddah Tower will have 167 floors, with the total number of levels reaching 252, many of which will not be full slab-separated floors but merely practical vertical subdivisions.^{[E]}

Floor	Purpose
Levels 240 – 252 (Spire)	Steel top Spire
Level 250 (Spire)	Building Maintenance Unit (BMU)
Level 206 – 218 (Spire)	Tuned mass dampers (870 + 260 Tons)
Level 204 (Spire)	BMU
Level 186 (Spire)	BMU
Level 168 (Spire)	BMU
Level 167 (Spire)	Sky Raft (4 meters thick Spire Transfer Slab)
Levels 161 – 166	Mechanical, Electrical and Plumbing (MEP) / BMU / Medium Voltage (MV) electrical equipment / Water Tanks Floors
Levels 157 – 159	Observatory and Sky Terrace (630 m)
Level 155	MEP / BMU Floors
Level 154	Refuge Floor
Levels 126 – 153	Void Space with Electric / Mechanical Rooms / Future Flexible Space
Level 124 (double height)	Refuge Floor
Levels 121 – 123	MEP / BMU Floors
Levels 106 – 120	Residential Group 4 Apartments (37 Units)
Level 104 (double height)	Refuge Floor
Levels 99 – 103	Residential Group 4 Apartments (28 Units)
Levels 95 – 96	MEP Floors
Levels 87 – 94	Residential Group 3 Apartments (40 Units)
Level 86	Refuge Floor
Level 84 (double height)	Residents Sky Lobbies Groups 3 and 4
Levels 73 – 83	Residential Group 2 Apartments (61 Units)
Level 71 (double height)	Refuge Floor
Levels 68 – 69	MEP / BMU Floors
Levels 58 – 67	Residential Group 1 Apartments (57 Units)
Level 56 (double height)	Refuge Floor
Levels 43 – 55	Residential Group 1 Apartments (102 Units)
Levels 42 – 43	Residents Sky Lobbies Groups 1 and 2
Levels 39 – 40	MEP / BMU Floors
Level 38	Refuge Floor
Levels 27 – 37	Four Seasons Private Residences (97 Units)
Levels 20 – 26	Four Seasons Hotel (182 Units)
Level 18	Refuge Floor
Levels 15 – 16	MEP Floors
Levels 7 – 13	Offices (sellable areas Core and Shell)
Level 4 – 6 (Podium)	Hotel, Spa, Pools, Fitness Centre
Level 2 (Podium)	Residential group 2 Lobby, Hotel amenities
Level 1 (Podium)	Lobby and Drop-offs (Residential, Hotel and Offices)
Basement 1 Mezz (Podium)	Observatory Lobby, Security
Basement 1 (Podium)	Parking, Security, Hotel Administration
Basement 2 (Podium)	Ballroom, Restaurants, Parking, MEP, Back of House (BoH), Facility Management (FM) service areas
Basement 3 (Podium)	Car Parking, Facilities Management, MEP
Below Podium	Pile Raft Foundation 270 circular bored piles of 45 – 105 meters depth and 1.5 – 1.8 meter diameter

== See also ==
- List of tallest buildings
- List of tallest buildings in Asia
- List of tallest buildings in Saudi Arabia
- List of tallest structures in the Middle East

== Notes ==
A. ^ ^{a} ^{b} ^{c} The actual height of the Burj Khalifa was not revealed until the opening ceremony. The developers of Jeddah Tower are similarly keeping the final height secret, stating only that it will be at least 1,000 metres (3,300 ft) high. In a television interview for WTTW in Chicago, architect Adrian Smith stated that the tower will be a little over twice the height of the Burj Khalifa, which is 828 metres (2,717 ft) high counting the antennas, suggesting that Jeddah Tower may be closer to 1,600 metres (5,200 ft); one mile high. Some sources have suggested that Jeddah Tower will break Burj Khalifa's record by over 740 metres (2,430 ft). In 2014, online sources were using the number 1,008 m (3,307 ft).

B. ^ ^{a} ^{b} This figure has been referred to as the "total building area" in publications, which is probably another term for gross floor area; the actual usable floor space, which is what buildings are typically measured by, will presumably be less. This area has also been reported as 540,000 m^{2} (5,800,000 ft^{2}).

C. ^ ^{a} This assumes a 2012 start date and the estimated completion time of 63 months.

D. ^ ^{a} Figure attained using the formula for the area of a circle (πr^{2}) and the given value of 30 m (98 ft) as the diameter.

E. ^ ^{a} ^{b} No official floor count has been given; however, Adrian Smith said it will be about 50 floors taller than the (163-floor) Burj Khalifa. In November 2010, an older kilometre-high design was said to contain over 200 floors.
