= Aeropolis 2001 =

Proposed high-rise building in Japan

- エアロポリス2001
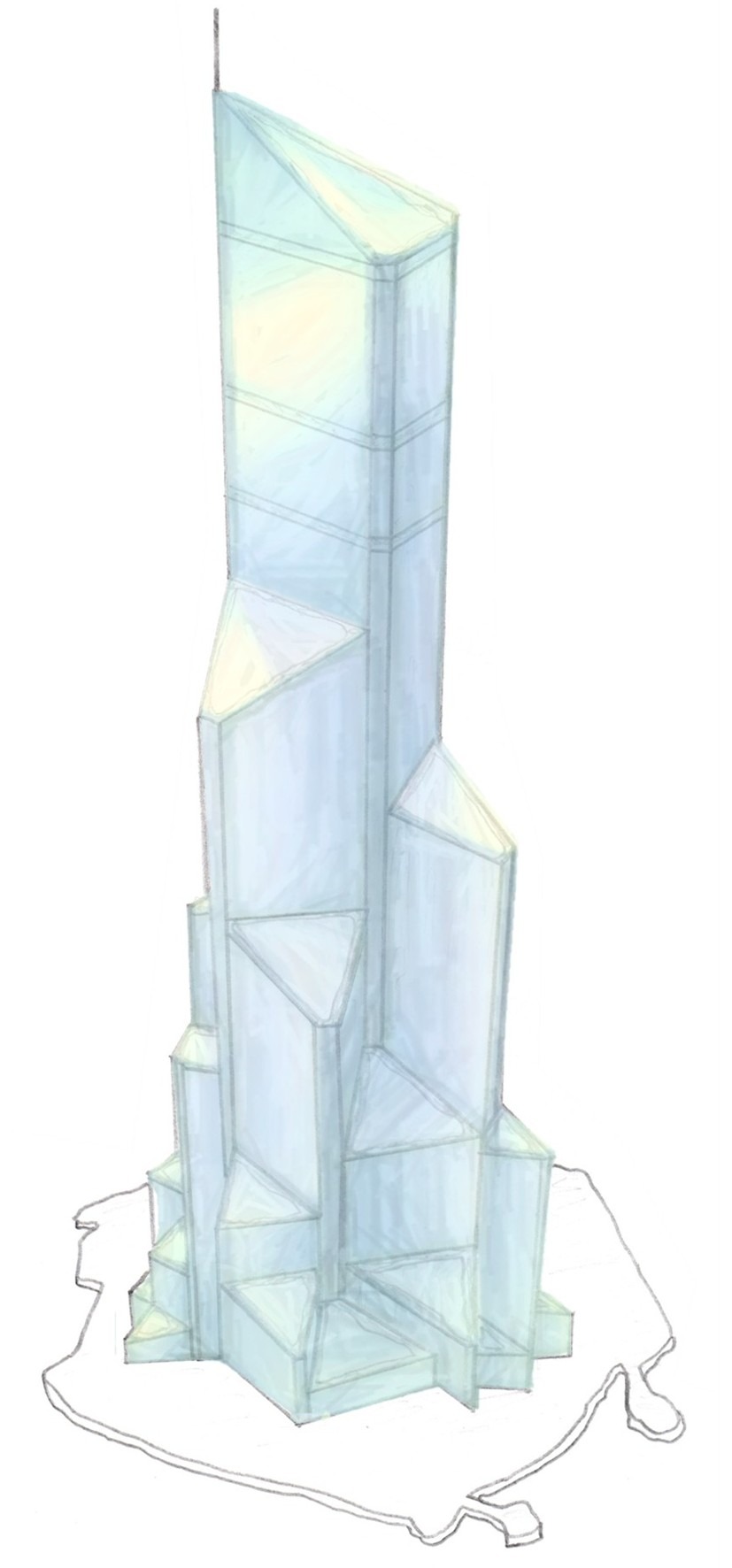
- Drawing of Aeropolis 2001

General information
- Status: Proposed
- Type: Arcology Skyscraper
- Architectural style: Futurism
- Location: Tokyo

Height
- Height: 2,001 metres (6,565 ft)

Technical details
- Floor count: 500

Design and construction
- Architecture firm: Obayashi Corp.

The Aeropolis 2001 is a proposed 500-story high-rise building over Tokyo Bay in Japan, envisioned by Obayashi Corporation. With a height of 2,001 metres (6,565 ft), the mammoth structure would have been approximately five times as tall as the former World Trade Center in New York City.

The Aeropolis 2001 was proposed in 1989, amid a spate of similar projects for incredibly large buildings. All were proposed during the Japanese asset price bubble, which ended in the early 1990s. According to a 1995 article, the corporation still had plans for the structure, and gave a proposed height of 2,079 metres (6,821 ft).

At the time it proposed Aeropolis 2001, Obayashi Corp. also proposed building a city on the moon by 2050. Newspapers have reported little on either proposal since 1995.

== Proposed details ==
Newspapers reported that plans called for the building to have 500 floors accommodating over 300,000 working inhabitants and 140,000 live-in residents. The structure was expected to be mixed-use, including restaurants, offices, apartments, cinemas, schools, hospitals, and post offices. It would have offered eleven square kilometers of floor space.

A shuttle lift, with 300 seats, would have gone from the ground floor to the top floor in 15 minutes, and stopped at every 40th floor. The proposal called for the tower to be fully sustainable and air conditioned.

A 1991 article by I. Uchizaki in Kensetsu No Kikaika, indexed by the U.S. Department of Energy, discussed Aeropolis 2001 along with other proposed high-rise urban projects in Japan, such as the X-Seed 4000, TRY2004, Sky City 1000, and DIB-200. The article noted that while these concepts were not expected to be realized in the near term, they were intended to identify limitations in then-current construction technology and areas for future development.

== See also ==
- Arcology
- Bionic Tower
- Bionic architecture
- Sky City 1000
- X-Seed 4000
