= The Illinois =

Conceptual skyscraper design by Frank Lloyd Wright in Chicago

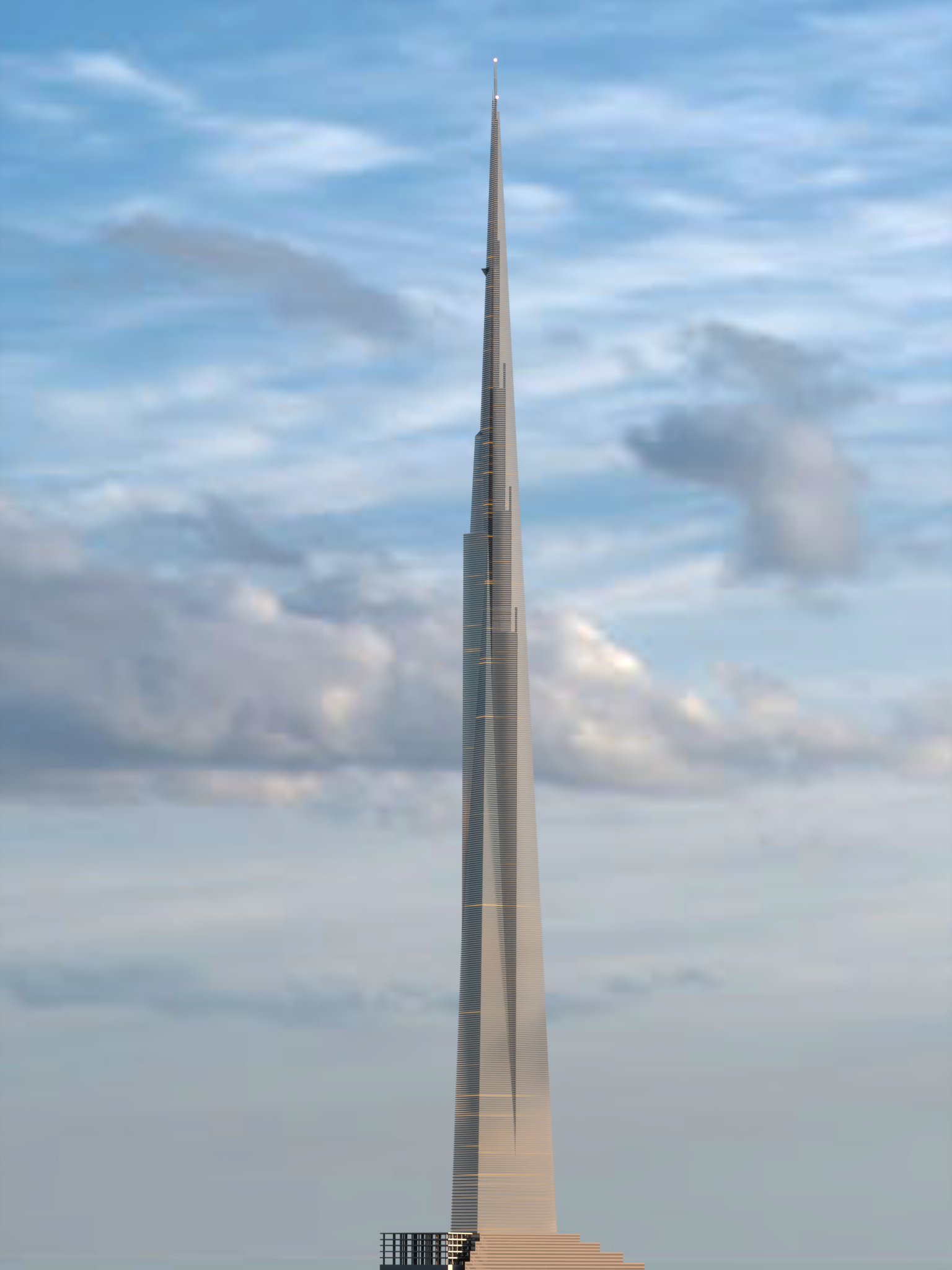
- An artist's impression of The Illinois

General information
- Status: Never built
- Type: Mixed use
- Location: Chicago, Illinois, U.S.

Height
- Antenna spire: 5,770 ft (1,760 m)
- Roof: 5,280 ft (1,610 m)

Technical details
- Floor count: 365
- Floor area: 18,460,000 square feet (1,715,000 m^{2})
- Lifts/elevators: 76

The Mile-High Illinois, or simply The Illinois, is an unbuilt conceptual design by American architect Frank Lloyd Wright for a one-mile-high (1.6 km) skyscraper to be built in Chicago. Wright described the project in his 1957 book, A Testament. The design included 528 stories, later revised to 365 stories, with a gross area of 18,460,000 square feet (1,715,000 m^{2}). Wright stated that there would be parking for 15,000 cars and 100 helicopters.

If built, it would top the list of the tallest buildings in the world by far, being more than four times the height of the Empire State Building, almost twice as tall as the world's tallest building as of 2026, the Burj Khalifa; and about 2,400 feet (730 m) taller than the under-construction Jeddah Tower – the latter two both designed by Adrian Smith, whose designs for both buildings are said to have been inspired by that of The Illinois.

== Technical feasibility ==
Wright believed that it would have been technically possible to construct such a building even at the time it was proposed. At the time, the tallest skyscraper in the world was New York's Empire State Building, at less than a quarter of the height suggested for the Illinois. It probably would have been possible to erect a self-supporting steel structure of the required height, but there are a number of problems that occur when a building is that tall.

The material used to build tall towers at the time, steel, is quite flexible. This allows towers to sway substantially in the wind, causing discomfort for occupants of the higher floors. Though Wright acknowledged this problem in his original proposal, he believed the tripod design of this tower (similar to that of the CN Tower, which was not designed until a decade after Wright's death) combined with its tensioned steel frame and the integral character of its structural components would counteract any oscillation. This also could have been solved by placing a tuned mass damper somewhere within the tower as was done in the Citigroup Center and Taipei 101, although this design innovation was not well-known until decades later. The late 1990s and early 2000s saw substantial increases in the load-bearing strength of concrete, making it possible to build entirely in this stiff material.

Wright explained that there would be 76 elevators, each having five-floor-high tandem cabs, serving blocks of five floors simultaneously. The 76 elevators would be divided into five banks or groups, with each elevator group serving a hundred-floor segment of the building. Wright's floor plan of the 528th floor shows it would be served by only one elevator shaft. The elevators were to be "atomic-powered", capable of mile-per-minute speeds, and running on ratchets instead of suspended by cables. But a realistic design would be powered by a third rail like trains.

The elevator banks extend beyond the sloping exterior walls at various points, giving the building the appearance of an elongated pyramid with protruding parapets. He said these elevators would enable the building to be evacuated in one hour, in combination with escalators that would serve the five lowest floors.

In his 1957 book, A Testament, Wright described the proposed structure with floor plans of the "base", 320th, and 528th (highest) floors. The floor plan for the 320th floor shows a single, open staircase, not separated from the surrounding office space in any way, not even with a door. The floor plan of the 528th floor shows that access is solely by a single elevator, with no staircase at all. Wright believed that because his building was fireproof, any fire precautions would be moot.

== Cultural references ==
- Fang Island released a song called "The Illinois" on their 2010 self-titled album that was inspired by the design.
- In 2014, Chicago-based Goose Island Brewery began bottling an IPA named The Illinois in honor of Wright's design, with label art featuring a hop cone design rendered to appear as if it were one of the architect's trademark stained glass windows.
- The Illinois appears in one of the alternate universes shown in the Apple TV sci-fi series Dark Matter.

== See also ==
- List of visionary tall buildings and structures
- List of Frank Lloyd Wright works
- List of tallest buildings and structures in the world
- Arcology
- Burj Khalifa
- Chicago Spire
- Jeddah Tower
- Shimizu Mega-City Pyramid
- Sky Mile Tower
- X-Seed 4000
