= Price Tower =

Building in Bartlesville, Oklahoma

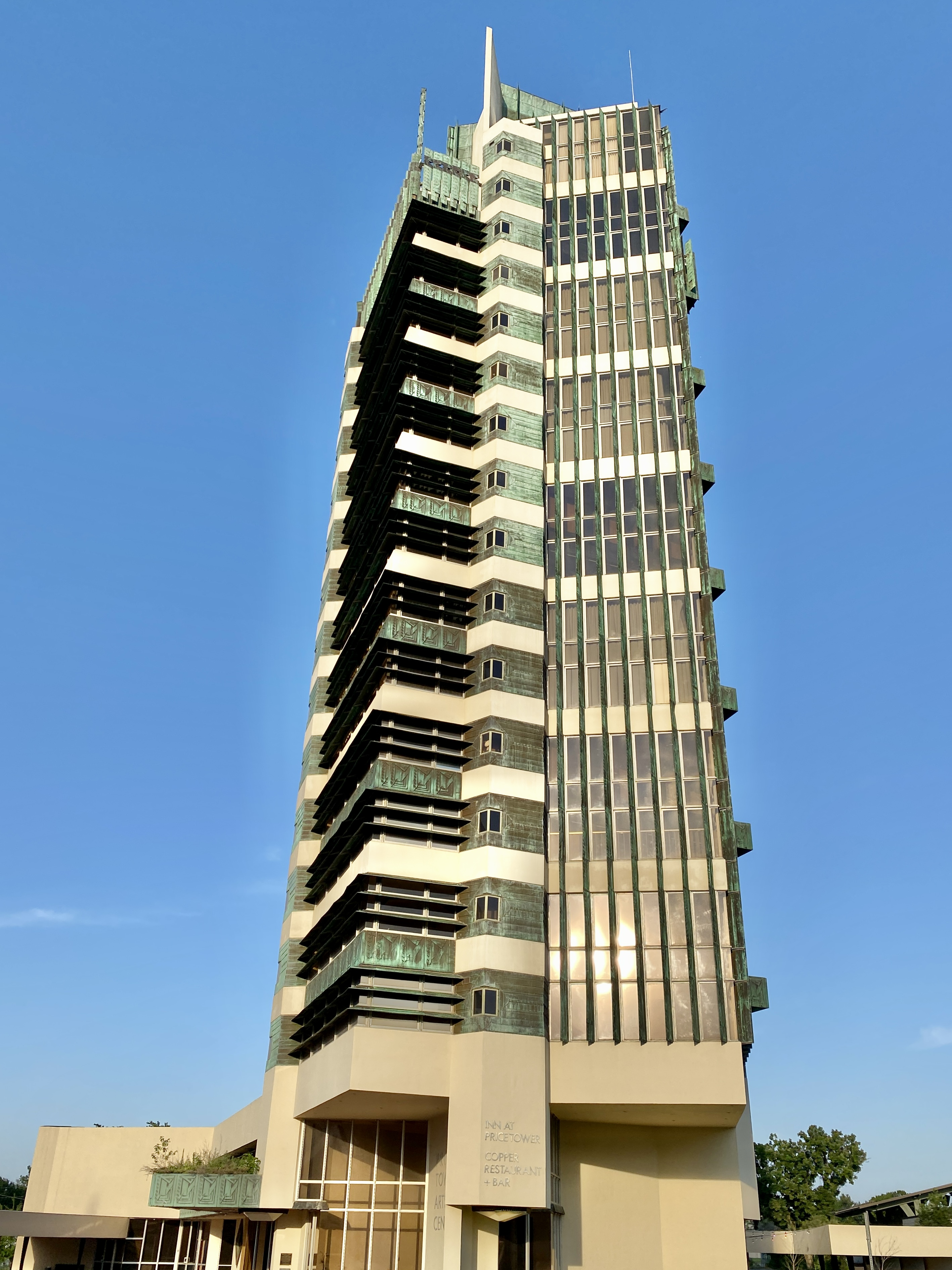
- Price Tower in 2023

General information
- Type: Multi-use
- Location: 510 S. Dewey Avenue, Bartlesville, Oklahoma, United States
- Construction started: 1952
- Completed: 1956

Height
- Antenna spire: 221 ft (67 m)

Technical details
- Floor count: 19
- Floor area: 42,000 square feet (3,900 m^{2})
- Lifts/elevators: 4

Design and construction
- Architect: Frank Lloyd Wright
- Main contractor: Haskell Culwell

Website
- pricetower.org
- Price Tower
- U.S. National Register of Historic Places
- U.S. National Historic Landmark
- Location within Oklahoma Location within the United States
- Location: Bartlesville, Oklahoma
- Coordinates: 36°44′52″N 95°58′34″W
- Built: 1956
- Architect: Frank Lloyd Wright
- NRHP reference No.: 74001670

Significant dates
- Added to NRHP: September 13, 1974
- Designated NHL: March 29, 2007

The Price Tower is a nineteen-story, 221-foot-high (67 m) skyscraper at 510 South Dewey Avenue in Bartlesville, Oklahoma, United States. One of the few high-rises designed by Frank Lloyd Wright, the Price Tower is derived from a 1929 proposal for a group of apartment buildings in New York City. Harold C. Price Sr., the head of the pipeline-construction firm H. C. Price Company, commissioned the tower. The building was widely discussed when it was completed in 1956. It received the American Institute of Architects' Twenty-five Year Award in 1983 and has been designated a National Historic Landmark.

The H. C. Price Company wanted to develop a modern headquarters in Bartlesville, and Harold Price hired Wright to design it in 1952. Groundbreaking took place on November 13, 1953, with a topping out ceremony in March 1955. The Price Tower opened on February 10, 1956, attracting thousands of sightseers. The Price Company sold the tower in 1981 to Phillips Petroleum, which occupied the tower's offices until the mid-1980s. Phillips donated the structure to the Price Tower Arts Center in 2001. The arts center subsequently converted part of the building into a museum, opening a boutique hotel and restaurant on the upper stories. The Price Tower was sold in 2023 and closed in 2024 following financial issues and legal disputes. It was resold in 2025 to McFarlin Building LLC, which began renovating it into a hotel and residential building that year.

As built, the Price Tower had about 42,000 square feet (3,900 m^{2}) of rentable space, split across one residential and three office quadrants. The floor plan is laid out on a grid of parallelograms with 30-60-90 triangles, arranged around a pinwheel-shaped structural core with four piers. The facade includes embossed copper spandrels and louvers, tinted glass windows, and poured stucco surfaces. The reinforced-concrete floors are cantilevered outward from the structural core. Initially, the residential and office portions of the building were accessed by different lobbies and elevators. The top three stories originally functioned as a penthouse apartment and office for the Price family. Although the exterior has remained intact over the years, the interiors have been converted to various uses.

== Site ==
The Price Tower is at 510 South Dewey Avenue in Bartlesville, in Washington County, Oklahoma, United States. It is in the state's northeastern corner, approximately 30 miles (48 km) north of Tulsa. It is on a 90,000-square-foot (8,400 m^{2}) city block bounded by the now-closed Silas Street (formerly Sixth Street) to the south, Dewey Avenue to the west, Fifth Street to the north, and Osage Avenue to the east. The tower's base occupies two land lots measuring a combined 150 by 140 feet (46 by 43 m).

The rest of the block includes a storage annex, which was originally used as a grocery store and car dealership, as well as a parking lot. The Tower Center at Unity Square, a green space and park immediately south of the Price Tower, links the tower with the Bartlesville Community Center. Work on the park began in March 2019, and it opened in May 2020.

== History ==
=== Development ===
Bartlesville, a small city in northeastern Oklahoma, had become economically prosperous in the late 19th and 20th centuries due to the success of the local oil industry. Oil magnates in Bartlesville commissioned architects to design lavish residences and offices. Among these was the Price Tower, commissioned by Harold C. Price Sr. as a corporate headquarters for his eponymous company, a pipeline-construction firm. Meanwhile, the architect Frank Lloyd Wright had wanted to develop a skyscraper ever since the early 1920s, when he drew up plans for the National Insurance Company Building, an unbuilt office tower in Chicago with cantilevered floor slabs.

==== Original New York plans ====
The Price Tower is directly derived from Wright's unbuilt plan for the redevelopment of St. Mark's Church in-the-Bowery in East Village, Manhattan, New York City. Wright had been friends with St. Mark's rector, William Norman Guthrie, since at least 1908. Guthrie wrote to Wright in October 1927, telling the architect about his intention to construct a high-rise building to alleviate the church's ongoing financial shortfalls. Negotiations over architects' fees continued over the next year. Guthrie asked Wright to waive all but $150 of his $7,500 design fee, (Note: Equivalent to $2,800 of his $141,000 design fee in 2025) claiming that the proposed buildings were located in an undesirable neighborhood and were thus unlikely to attract high-paying rental tenants. It was not until December 1928 that Wright sketched out designs for the St. Mark's towers. Edgar Kaufmann Jr., a historian of Wright's work, wrote that the St. Mark's towers were loosely based on the Romeo and Juliet Windmill, which Wright had designed for his aunts at Taliesin, his family's estate in Wisconsin. To comply with New York City building codes, Wright devised plans for towers of between 10 and 20 stories.

The initial design called for several (Note: Although contemporary sources from 1929 say that there were supposed to be four towers, later sources give a figure of three towers.) 16-to-18-story apartment buildings between 10th and 11th streets west of Second Avenue. In contrast to the skyscrapers that predominated in Manhattan at the time, which had setbacks, Wright's designs resembled inverted cones. The floor plans, rotated 30 degrees from a rectangular ground-level site, were divided into quadrants around a pinwheel-shaped core. The rooms were laid out on a grid of parallelograms and triangles based on the 30-60-90-degree geometry. The floors would have been cantilevered outward from the core, the only part of each building anchored to the ground. A steel-and-glass curtain wall would have been suspended from the ends of each floor slab. The structures would have contained steel furniture and copper walls. The apartments would have been duplex units, with 36 units in each building; the second-floor units would have run diagonally across each structure.

Wright called his design "modern—not modernistic". Guthrie began to express doubts about the plans in 1930, following objections from St. Mark's vestry, and the project was ultimately canceled during the Great Depression. Afterward, Wright attempted to resurrect the St. Mark's project multiple times without success, including in his Broadacre City project. He continued to refine his tower design in the 1930s and 1940s. In particular, the superstructure of the Johnson Wax Headquarters' research tower (completed in Racine, Wisconsin, in 1950) is similar to that of the St. Mark's towers, except for the design of the curtain wall. Wright's next building in New York City, the Solomon R. Guggenheim Museum, would not be constructed until the 1950s.

==== Bartlesville plans ====
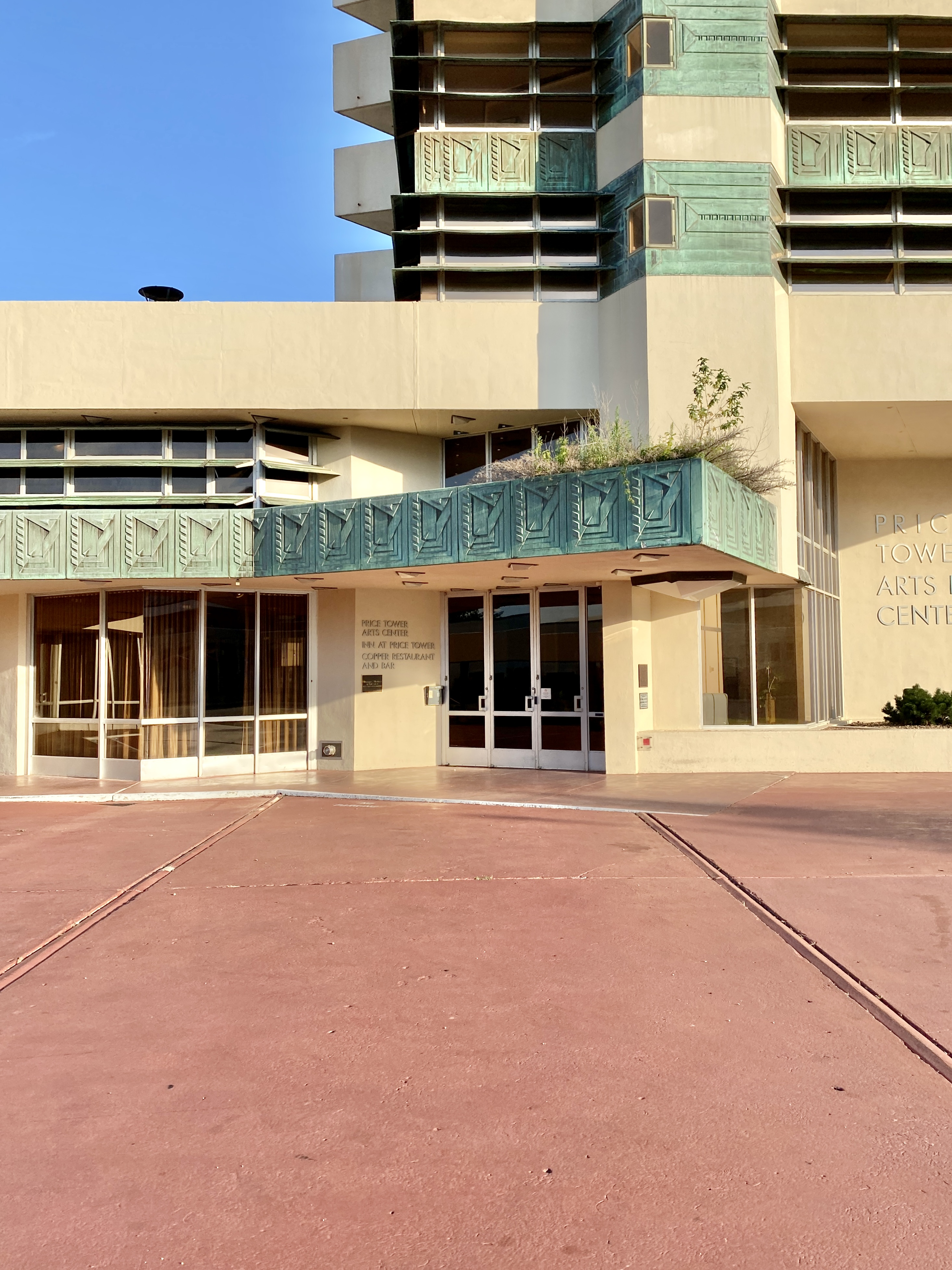
Main entrance to the Price Tower

By the 1950s, the H. C. Price Company wanted to develop a modern headquarters in Bartlesville. At the time, the city had 19,000 residents, and its only other tall building was a 14-story structure developed by the Phillips Petroleum Company. Sources disagree on how Wright and the Price family came in contact. Several sources write that the architect Bruce Goff, who chaired the University of Oklahoma's (OU) school of architecture, recommended that the Prices hire Wright to design the headquarters. According to Architecture: the AIA journal, Goff had become involved after Price's son Joe, a student at OU, had asked him for advice. Other accounts state that Harold Sr.'s wife, Mary Lou Price, had read about Wright and recommended him to her husband, or that Harold's sons and daughter-in-law had recommended Wright after attending one of the architect's lectures at OU. Initially, Harold Sr. did not believe that Wright would be interested in designing a headquarters for the Price Company, as Harold Sr. neither sought a corporate icon nor needed large amounts of space. His sons, Joe and Harold Jr., told their father that hiring Wright would be no more expensive than hiring any other architect to design a generic "box-type structure".

The Prices went to Wright's Wisconsin studio, and Price and Wright haggled over the building's proposed height. Price had wanted a low-rise structure measuring two or three stories tall with space to park ten trucks. Although Price envisioned a structure with 25,000 square feet (2,300 m^{2}) in total, Wright wanted a 25-story structure with 25,000 square feet per story. Price claimed a skyscraper would be "such a big building for a small town", while Wright countered that he had taken a regular low-rise structure and "stood it on end". Wright also allegedly told Price that "I'm going to give you the building I've been trying to build for 35 years." By August 1952, Harold Price Sr. sought to develop a building that was at least 10 stories tall, which would also include some apartments. Joe Price, one of Harold's two sons, later recalled that it took Wright two hours to convince Price to agree to a 12-story structure. As Harold Price Sr. later wrote, "We finally compromised on nineteen floors."

The final design was nearly identical to the St. Mark's design, although the dimensions of each floor at the Price Tower were smaller than those of the St. Mark's towers. The Price Company's vice president, John M. Thomas, later recalled that Harold Price "wanted that building to be a monument to the work our company had done, laying a pipeline through Alaska". On the other hand, Price himself said that "it was not our intent to build a monument" but that, nonetheless, the tower became a point of pride for Bartlesville. Wright thought the Bartlesville location was ideal because he believed that skyscrapers belonged in rural areas, where they stood out from the surrounding landscape. Joe Price also asked Goff to design a house next to the Price Tower, but after Wright asked if Goff's design was meant as a joke, the planned house was canceled.

==== Construction ====
In May 1953, Price announced plans for a high-rise tower to be built on a 140-by-150-foot (43 by 46 m) site at the northeastern corner of Dewey Avenue and Sixth Street in Bartlesville. The structure was to be 186 feet (57 m) tall, with a three-story penthouse for the Price Company, eight double-story apartments, and a two-story annex for the Public Service Company. Wright, who had added the apartments at the Prices' request, envisioned the Price Tower as a model for other mixed-use high-rises in smaller American towns and cities. Price had anticipated that the building would cost $500,000. (Note: About $4.7 million in 2024) Haskell Culwell, a company from Oklahoma City, was hired as the main contractor in July 1953. W. Kelly Oliver was the lighting consultant, L. B. Perkins was hired as the electrical engineer, and Collins and Gould served as the mechanical engineer. Subcontractors submitted extremely high bids for materials; for example, one bidder offered to install the exterior copper for $450,000, (Note: About $4.2 million in 2024) while another bidder offered to pour concrete for $300,000. (Note: About $2.8 million in 2024) During the building's development, there were also disputes between Wright and Price over such details as chairs.

Work was delayed for several months due to difficulties in securing materials and widening a nearby street; in addition, it took more than a year to sketch out the design details. Groundbreaking took place on November 13, 1953, and site excavation was complete by that December. Wright's son-in-law and apprentice, William Wesley Peters, was appointed as Wright's on-site representative, and several contractors from Oklahoma and Texas were hired for the project. Wright visited Bartlesville in early 1954 to discuss the tower's design with 400 college students. Construction was temporarily halted that March due to a labor strike. Workers installed a temporary elevator hoist, which was extended upward as the building's superstructure rose. Simultaneously, the floor slabs were poured; the lowest stories took a month to pour, but workers became more efficient at pouring concrete as the structure ascended. By August 1954, concrete work had reached the sixth story, which had been poured in a week.

Work on the tower continued through late 1954, with workers completing one story every 12 days; the tower had reached the 15th story by December. The developers were so heavily focused on the Price Tower's completion that they discouraged sightseers from coming, and they did not respond to the myriad of inquires about the tower's construction. The 19th and final story was completed in February 1955, and workers began installing interior finishes on the lowest stories. In addition, workers began installing some of the windows. A topping out ceremony took place on March 14, 1955, at which point the building was scheduled to be completed in mid-1955. Joe Price was so heavily involved with the Price Tower's development that he lived on-site while the tower was being completed. By that October, the building was still not open, but the Price Company was preparing to receive its first tenants. In January 1956, in preparation for the tower's opening, Bartlesville's traffic committee voted to add parking spaces to the streets surrounding the tower.

=== Price ownership ===
==== Completion and early years ====
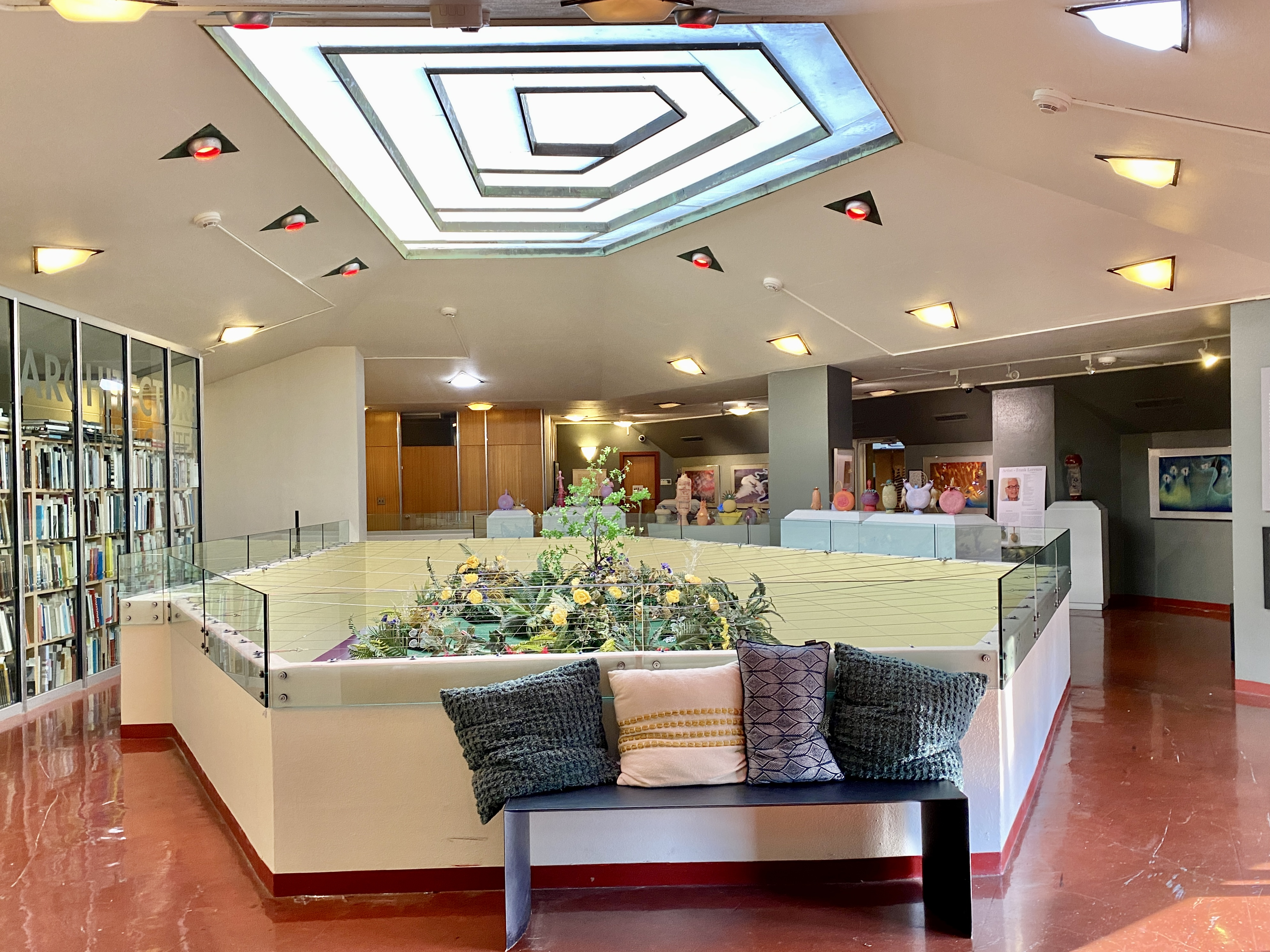
The lobby

The Price Tower opened for media previews on February 4, 1956, and the building officially opened five days later on February 9. Only residents of Bartlesville were allowed to tour the structure on the first day, and the general public was allowed to visit over the weekend of February 11 and 12. The opening ceremonies attracted 13,000 sightseers. A retrospective Pittsburgh Post-Gazette article claimed that the Price Tower had cost $2.4 million to construct, (Note: About $21.1 million in 2024) while contemporary estimates ranged as high as $13 million. (Note: About $114.6 million in 2024) The Price family publicly cited the building's cost as $6.5 million, (Note: About $57.3 million in 2024) and Harold Sr. wrote in an August 1956 letter that he had spent $2.1 million. (Note: About $18.5 million in 2024) At the time of construction, the Price Tower was reportedly the most expensive building ever constructed in Bartlesville. The structure was also among the first skyscrapers with both apartments and offices from the outset. The tower's completion brought considerable attention to the Price family.

Harold Price was proud of the structure, placing images of it on the cover of his company's newsletter, Tie-In; the Price Company also gave free tours of the building. The apartments were variously cited as having been rented out for $285 (Note: About $3,375 in 2025) or $325 a month. (Note: About $3,849 in 2025) The offices rented for $135 to $165 a month depending on the office's location in the building. (Note: About $1,599–1,954 in 2025) The Price Company initially occupied the office space on the 12th through 19th floors, employing sixty people there. The Public Service Company of Oklahoma moved into the two-story annex east of the main tower. Other early tenants included the General Acceptance Company on three stories, the Claiborne Company on the 11th floor, and an ophthalmologist's office. The building's tenants later included doctors and lawyers, as well as communications, utility, and real-estate firms. Bruce Goff moved into the Price Tower's 9th-and-10th-floor apartment and maintained an office in the building. Two years after the Price Tower opened, it still attracted 40 to 50 tourists during the weekend, though two of the eight apartments were vacant.

==== Subsequent modifications ====
After Wright's death in 1959, Price hired a Swiss company to manufacture a sundial in Wright's honor. The sundial, which was installed next to the tower's southwest corner in November 1961, was vandalized shortly afterward. In 1960, Taliesin Associated Architects, the successor firm to Wright's practice, drew up plans to convert some of the unused apartments into offices. Although the Price family continued to take pride in the building's design, Joe Price said the company did not earn much from rental income; even if the Price Tower were fully occupied, it would still earn only $24,000 a year. (Note: About $211,000 in 2024) The apartments were particularly difficult to rent, since one could buy a house in rural Oklahoma inexpensively, and there was little demand for apartments. Goff later recalled that, though up to five of the apartments were sometimes rented simultaneously, there were times when he was the only resident.

By the late 1960s, the Public Service Company had outgrown its offices in the building. During that time, the lobby displayed a rotating exhibit of photographs that Joe Price had taken while on a safari. Thirty-five to forty Price Company employees still worked at the Price Tower in the early 1970s. The remaining apartments were converted to office space in the 1960s and early 1970s, and only the Price penthouse remained by 1972. As part of a master plan for Bartlesville, city officials announced plans in 1978 for a $10.5 million community center next to the Price Tower, (Note: About $39.5 million in 2024) which was finished in 1982. The drive-through counter between the main tower and its annex was enclosed in the late 1970s, and a shop in the lobby had become a reception desk by the early 1980s. The exterior remained almost entirely unchanged, and the furniture and interior decorations remained in place.

=== Philips Petroleum ownership ===
In December 1980, the H. C. Price Company agreed to sell the Price Tower to Phillips Petroleum, which wanted to preserve the building. Phillips formally took over the Price Tower in April 1981, and The Daily Oklahoman wrote the next month that Phillips had paid $2.5 million. (Note: About $7.3 million in 2024) Though Phillips preserved the building's interior decorations, it left the penthouse unused. During the 1980s, Phillips constructed or acquired several other buildings in downtown Bartlesville, and by 1983 there were media reports that Phillips planned to move out of the building. Phillips moved out during the middle of the decade. (Note: Sources disagree on whether the company moved out during 1984 or 1987.) Several reasons have been cited for Phillips's relocation, including the 1980s oil glut, the opening of the nearby Plaza Office Building in 1985, and a decline in the local labor force. Harold Jr.'s ex-wife, Carolyn S. Price, said that even though the tower was seemingly out of place in Bartlesville, "when the Price Tower closed, people realized how much they missed it".

Phillips initially sought new tenants for the Price Tower, as the company planned to move employees to one of its other office towers nearby. The company received several proposals, including one plan that would have converted the Price Tower to residential condominiums. Phillips's lawyers ultimately deemed the exterior exit staircase a safety risk, and Phillips subsequently used the building only for storage. The Bartlesville Museum (later the Price Tower Arts Center, or PTAC) opened at the Price Tower in 1990, becoming its only tenant and occupying some ground-floor space. Under an agreement with Phillips, the museum was allowed to occupy the building without paying rent. The OK Mozart International Music Festival and the Landmark Preservation Council also moved into the building. In addition, tours of the building were given one day a week in the early 1990s.

Phillips began replacing the tower's roof in 1994, and the building was placed for sale the next year. After the Bartlesville Museum expressed interest in buying the tower in early 1996, Phillips agreed to postpone the building's sale for a year. Local residents formed the Price Tower Preservation Committee that May to raise $10 million for the building, (Note: About $17.9 million in 2024) including $5–6 million for maintenance. (Note: About $9.0–10.7 million in 2024) Phillips agreed in August 1998 to donate the building to the PTAC after the arts center raised a $3.5 million endowment fund for the tower's future operation. (Note: About $6.3 million in 2024) Subsequently, the art center asked charitable foundations to donate to the endowment fund. The spire was also restored in 1998, followed the next year by the facade. The same year, the PTAC restored Bruce Goff's apartment, and the organization sought to raise $125,000 for furnishings and educational programming. The family of Phillips's chief executive C. J. Silas also donated $3.2 million for the building's restoration, as well as $4 million to fund the PTAC's programs.

=== PTAC takeover and renovation ===
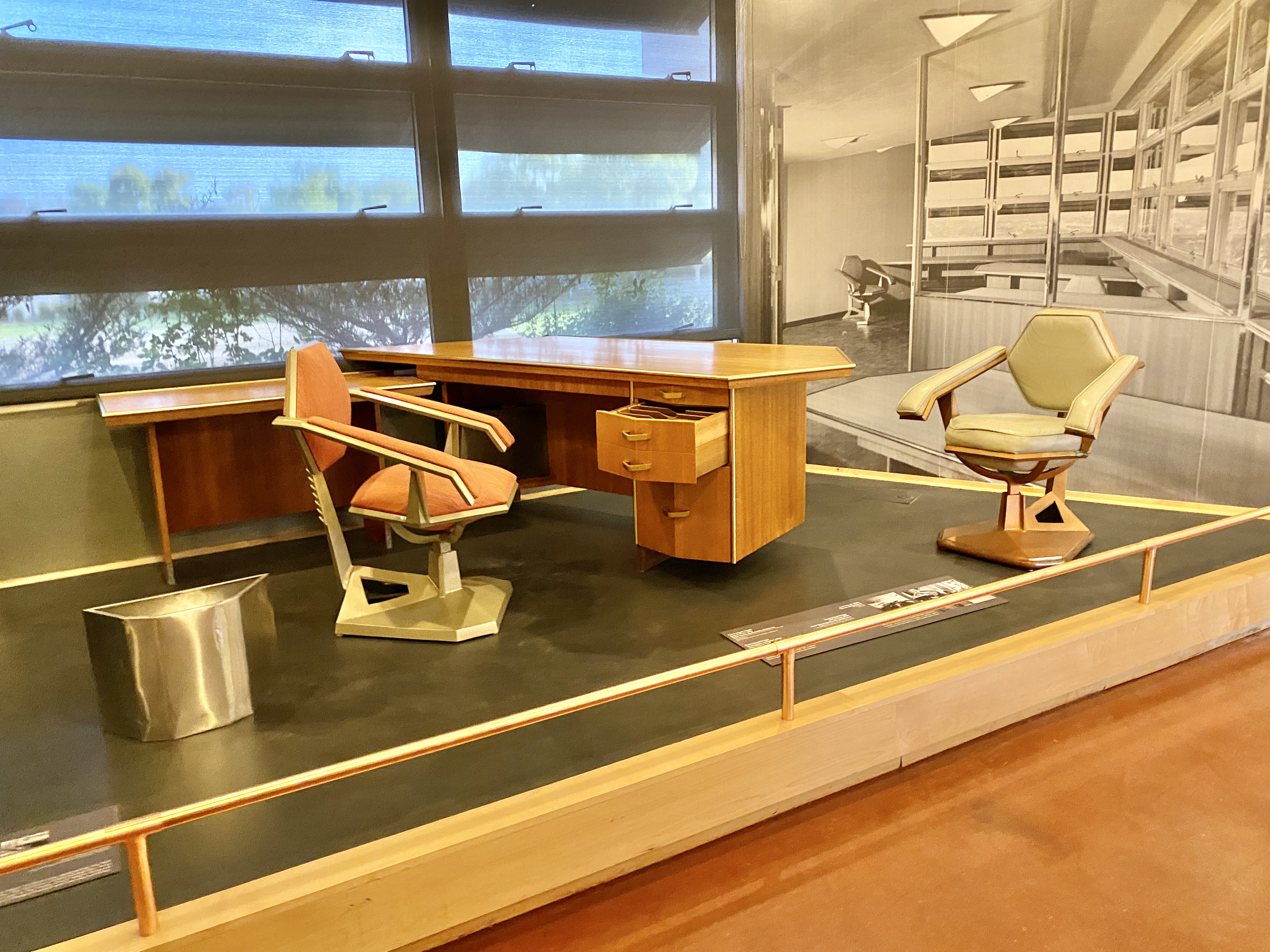
Furniture in the Price Tower

Phillips Petroleum donated the building to the PTAC in either 2000 or 2001. Following an extensive renovation, the tower was rededicated on February 10, 2001. As part of a second phase of renovations, the PTAC wished to convert part of the Price Tower into a hotel and a restaurant, profits from which would be used to help maintain the tower. Wendy Evans Joseph was hired to convert the middle stories into a boutique hotel, the Inn at Price Tower, for $2.1 million, of which $1.9 million was raised privately. The interior layout was largely preserved, and some objects were placed into storage. The hotel opened in April 2003 with tours of the tower included with room reservations. Joseph designed the Copper Bar and Restaurant on the 15th and 16th stories, and the PTAC renovated the lobby and penthouse suite as well.

The British architect Zaha Hadid was commissioned to design an expansion of the PTAC in 2002. The expansion was planned to cost $15 million, and it would have covered 50,000 square feet (4,600 m^{2}) or 58,000 square feet (5,400 m^{2}). The annex's design was inspired by that of the original building, with triangular motifs, and was boomerang-shaped. Had the annex been built, it would have included three galleries, classrooms, offices, and an auditorium. Most of the art center's collection would have been moved to this annex, freeing up space in the original building for the hotel and restaurant. Although Hadid's design was showcased at New York's Solomon R. Guggenheim Museum in 2006, the expansion was never completed.

The PTAC proposed adding a sculpture garden next to the tower in 2004, and the office interiors were restored in the mid-2000s. The penthouse was restored to its original condition, reopening in 2006 as part of the PTAC. For the penthouse suite's restoration, the PTAC received $20,000 from the National Endowment for the Arts and $6,740 from the Cynthia Woods Mitchell Fund for Historic Interiors. Ambler Architects, which had helped restore the Price Tower, moved into one of the offices. The Frank Lloyd Wright Building Conservancy gave the Silas family a preservation award in 2006 for their work restoring the Price Tower. The Inn at Price Tower became a popular attraction, with visitors from around the world, and its opening helped revive Bartlesville's economy. The Copper restaurant closed temporarily in 2009 due to the 2008 financial crisis, but the bar remained open. The museum also struggled financially during the 2008 financial crisis.

The building had 30,000 annual visitors by 2014, and visitation increased in the late 2010s. The Copper Restaurant and Bar's chefs-in-residence program, and the Pioneer Woman Museum in nearby Ponca City, Oklahoma, were credited with increasing the Price Tower's popularity. The PTAC also formed a partnership with the Crystal Bridges Museum of American Art in Bentonville, Arkansas, where another Wright–designed building, the Bachman–Wilson House, was being used as an exhibit. In 2017, the PTAC received a $75,000 matching funds grant through the Getty Foundation's Keeping It Modern program. The grant was used to hire a team of conservators led by Gunny Harboe, who began devising plans for the building's preservation in November 2019. At the time, PTAC director Scott Amble said the building was prone to flooding and lacked insulation.

=== Copper Tree ownership and closure ===
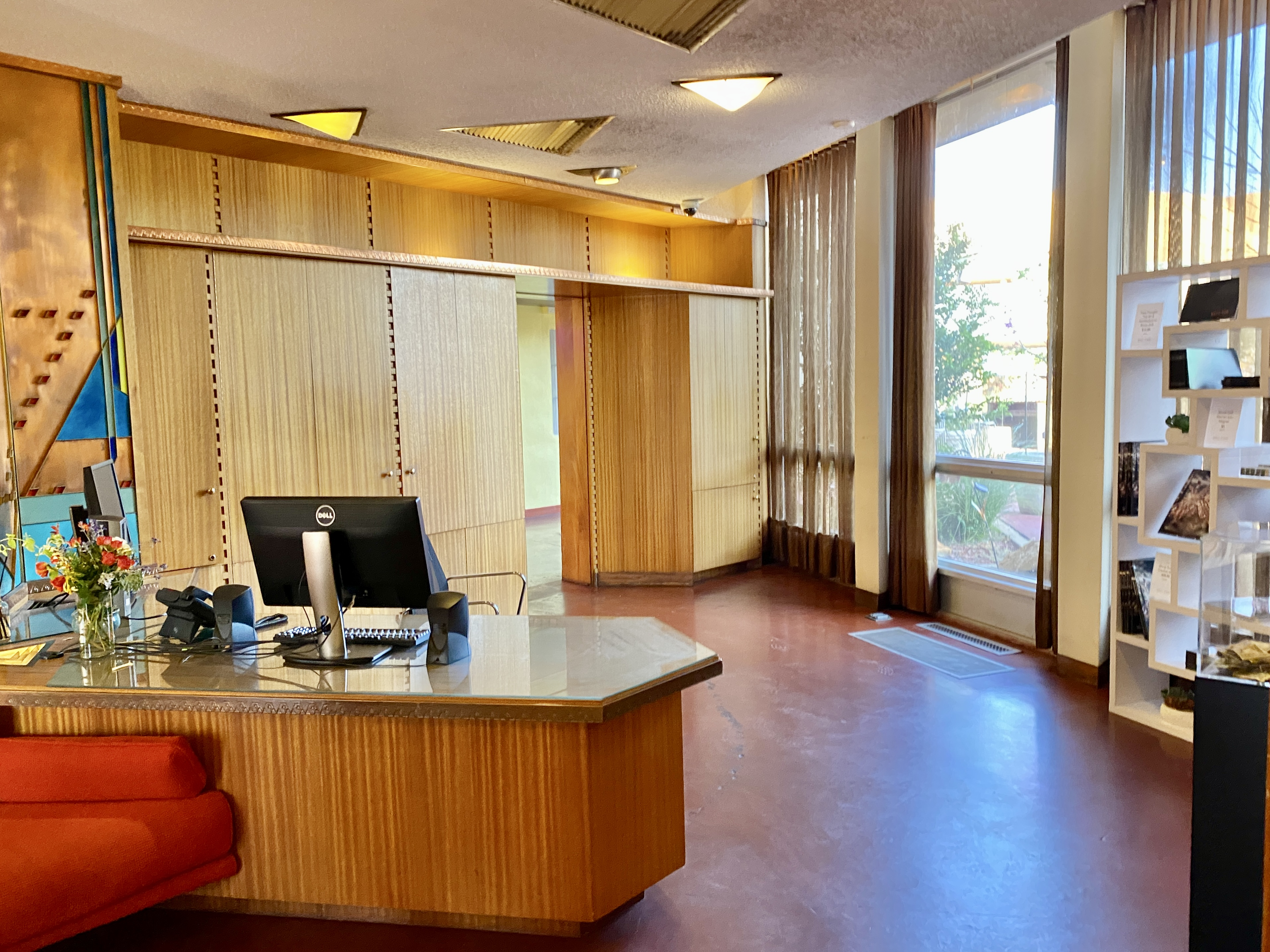
View of the lobby

By 2022, the Price Tower experienced financial issues due to COVID-19 pandemic restrictions, decreased revenue and donations, and the deaths of two Silas family members. The PTAC voted in February 2023 to sell the building to Copper Tree Inc., a local group, which took over the tower that March for a nominal fee of $10. At the time, the building was reportedly $500,000 or $600,000 in debt, for which Copper Tree took over responsibility. The Frank Lloyd Wright Building Conservancy also held an easement on the building, requiring the owners to pay insurance and maintain the building, among other things. Cynthia Blanchard, one of the principals in Copper Tree, had planned to renovate the tower to attract technology-related tenants. The renovation was initially planned to cost $10 million and include upgrades to mechanical systems, elevators, and windows. Work on the renovation had not started by 2024. The Bartlesville Development Authority also offered $88,000 in tax incentives to attract two restaurants to the building. Copper Tree began selling off the tower's furniture and decorations in April 2024, despite opposition from local residents and the PTAC. The furniture had also been sold without the Wright Building Conservancy's permission, violating the conservancy's easement.

The firm that had bought and renovated Tulsa's Mayo Hotel, McFarlin Building LLC, offered to buy the tower for $1.4 million in May 2024. By mid-2024, Copper Tree owed more than $2 million. Blanchard claimed that, even though the hotel, restaurant, and bar had been truncated to three-day-a-week operation, Copper Tree was still not receiving enough revenue from rent. As a result, in August, Copper Tree announced that the tower would close on September 1. The hotel was closed immediately, and most employees were fired. In addition, tenants received 30-day eviction notices, and Copper Tree sold more furniture. Visit Bartlesville, the city's tourism agency, said at the time that the Price Tower was the city's most popular attraction. Visit Bartlesville continued to give tours of the tower's exterior while the interior was closed.

The Price Tower was supposed to have been sold at auction in early October 2024, but the auction was halted amid a lawsuit from McFarlin Building LLC over whether an earlier sale agreement covering the structure was still active. McFarlin alleged that Blanchard had agreed to sell them the building before reneging. Copper Tree also sued the Wright Building Conservancy in mid-October, requesting that a judge nullify the conservancy's liens on the building. The building was scheduled to go up for bid again in mid-November, but that auction was also canceled. The Wright Building Conservancy filed a counterclaim in December 2024, saying that Copper Tree had violated the easement, which the organization claimed was still valid. In addition, the building's owners owed the Oklahoma Tax Commission at least $9,000. The utilities were shut off for non-payment, before a judge ordered them reinstated.

=== Sale to McFarlin Building LLC ===
In January 2025, a Washington County judge ruled that the tower had to be sold to McFarlin for $1.4 million; at the time, Copper Tree and Green Copper Holdings reportedly had only $216 in assets. That February, the judge confirmed the sale would go through, with the proceeds to be held by the court until all claims were resolved. Blanchard filed for Chapter 11 bankruptcy protection that month, so a bankruptcy auction for the building was scheduled for May 6, with bidding starting on March 31. Of more than 900 potential bidders notified of the auction, McFarlin was the only one to submit a bid. In early May 2025, the building was sold to McFarlin for its original bid of $1.4 million; the new owner planned to use it as a residential building and hotel. The restoration was to cost $10 million, partly financed by historic-preservation tax credits, and it was planned to be completed in 2027.

Shortly after buying the tower, McFarlin drained standing water that had accumulated in the basement, and turned the power back on. That August, the Frank Lloyd Wright Building Conservancy bought 11 of the building's original furnishings that had been sold the previous year. The new owners began renovating the Price Tower that December, hiring Brickhugger to oversee the work. The project, costing $10 million, included converting the interior into 20 residences and 20 hotel rooms. The Copper Bar and Restaurant was to be removed, while the penthouse office was to be preserved as a museum. The lawsuits over the tower itself were resolved in early 2026. Blanchard, the former owner, sued several media outlets for defamation that August over news coverage of the furnishings' disposition.

== Architecture ==
The Price Tower, a 19-story building designed by Frank Lloyd Wright, measures 221 feet (67 m) tall from ground level to the tip of the spire. Excluding the 35-foot (11 m) spire, the building is 186 feet (57 m) tall. Wright believed that people could live "a richer, more connected life" if residential and business uses were combined and planned the building as an "urban microcosm concept, where you would live, work, eat, and shop all in the same space". As built, the Price Tower had over 37,000 square feet (3,400 m^{2}) of rentable space. Including corridors and other non-rentable spaces, the gross floor area was 57,315 square feet (5,324.7 m^{2}).

The main tower is divided into a two-story base and a 17-story upper section, which includes a three-story penthouse. There is a two-story annex adjacent to the base. The building is divided into quadrants, of which one originally contained double-height apartments, while the other three were for offices. Each quadrant is rotated 30 degrees from its neighbors, except for odd-numbered stories in the southwestern quadrant's apartments. One of the quadrants is slightly smaller than the others.

Wright nicknamed the Price Tower "the tree that escaped the crowded forest", referring both to the building's design and to his original plans for a New York skyscraper. The Price Tower has been described either as Wright's only completed skyscraper or one of his only two completed towers, the other being the Johnson Wax Headquarters' research tower. (Note: The Johnson Wax Company's research tower is shorter, at 166 feet (51 m). Wright also designed the Illinois skyscraper, which was never built.)

=== Facade ===
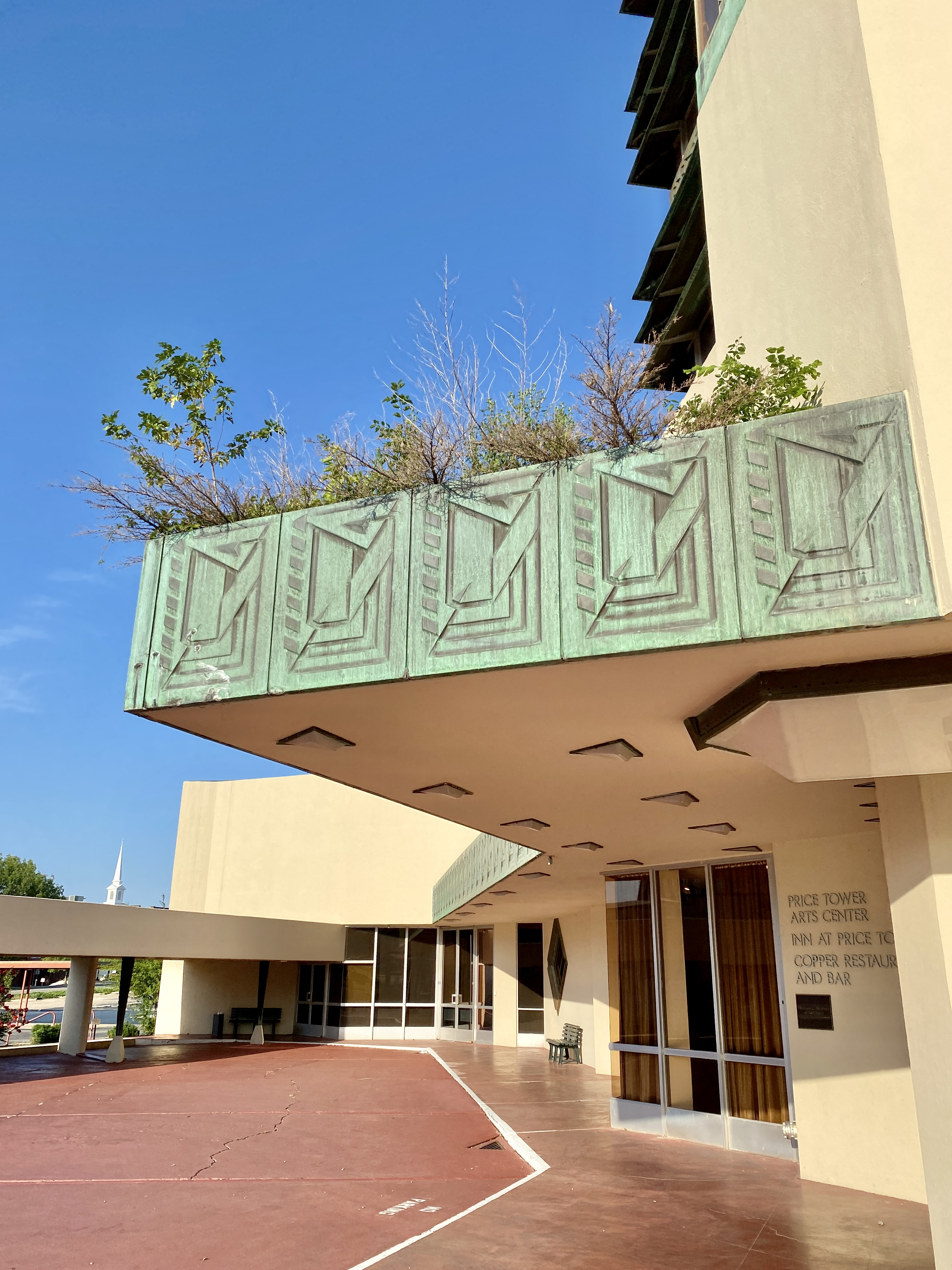
Detail of the Dewey Avenue entrance

As designed, each elevation of the main tower measures 45 feet (14 m) wide. The building is asymmetrical, and each elevation has a different appearance. The facade panels are suspended from the floor slabs, and most of the exterior decorations are made of copper. The facade includes louvers to help shield the interiors from sunlight. The louvers are 20 inches (510 mm) wide and were oxidized into a blue-green color before they were installed. The louvers on the office sections of the building are arranged horizontally, while those on the residential section are arranged vertically. The horizontal louvers were intended to keep out the wind and rain while also blocking direct sunlight, while the vertical louvers are placed on the southwest corner, which has the most exposure to sunlight throughout the day. The 16th-story terrace has movable louvers. There are also embossed copper spandrels embedded into the ends of the concrete floor slabs, which are decorated with a motif loosely resembling the floor plans. Wright anticipated that the spandrels would change color as they aged.

The rest of the facade is generally made of poured concrete covered with stucco. All exterior trim is made of aluminum, while the exterior lamps are made of copper. The glass panes were originally tinted in gold and copper hues. A reflective film was added to the windows in the late 20th century, though the film on the southeast-quadrant windows was removed in 2003. Balconies on each floor provide shade to parts of the facade, and roof gardens were planted atop the annex and the apartment balconies. Wright, a major proponent of organic architecture, believed that the roof gardens and glass-and-steel facade would help integrate the building's interior and exterior. He envisioned the terraces as "intermediaries" that connected the indoors and outdoors. The facade also contains a 4-by-4-inch (100 by 100 mm) red tile, on which Wright signed his initials.

At the ground or first story, the annex was originally divided from the main tower via a drive-through counter with vertical windows. The annex's northern wall has a rhombus window with embossed copper bands, as well as a skylight with a copper frame. Although the second story of the annex was physically connected to the main tower, there was no way to travel between the two parts of the building without going outside. Between 1978 and 1979, the drive-through counter was enclosed, becoming the Taliesin Room.

There is also a one-story storage shed to the east, which was built in the 1980s or 1990s, in addition to canopies and loggias for pedestrians and vehicles. There are two carports outside the building: one to the north for office tenants, and one to the south for residents. The walkways and driveways are painted Cherokee red.

=== Structural and mechanical features ===
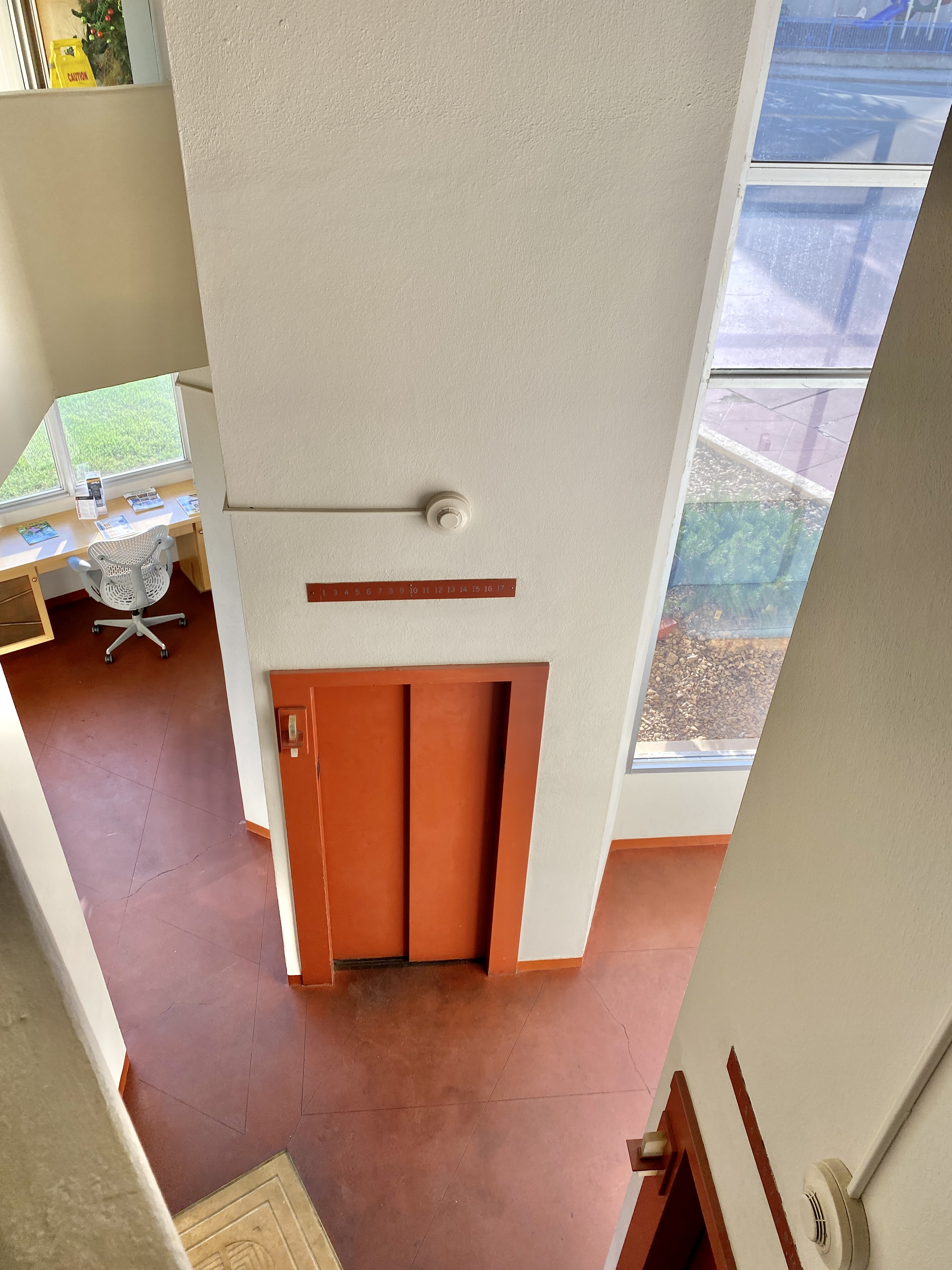
Elevators are embedded into the structural piers.

The structural core is made of four reinforced-concrete support piers extending the full height of the tower, each measuring 18 feet (5.5 m) wide by 10 feet (3.0 m) thick. The piers rest on a concrete platform 25 feet (7.6 m) below ground, which measures 3 feet (0.91 m) thick. The piers are arranged in a pinwheel configuration around a small open area in the center, forming a hollow "X" shape as seen from above. Utility pipes, wires, and ducts are embedded in these piers, with the air-conditioning system in the piers and floor slabs. The building's interior is divided into four air-conditioning zones, one for each quadrant; the ducts in each pier serve a different quadrant. The building is served by three air-cooling machines above the main tower's 15th story and another machine above the two-story annex.

The main tower's floor slabs are made of reinforced concrete, while the walls are made of glass and concrete. The floor slabs taper in thickness from 20 inches (510 mm) at the core to 3 inches (76 mm) at the building's perimeter. The floors are cantilevered outward, extending as much as 19 feet (5.8 m) from the crossbeams that connect each pair of piers. The cantilevered floors permit a more flexible floor plan while also making the building one-seventh the weight of similar skyscrapers. Wright claimed that a similar-sized building in New York's Rockefeller Center weighed about as much as 6.1 buildings of the Price Tower's size. However, the piers carry all of the building's weight, limiting the extent to which the central portion of each floor can be modified.

The upper stories were originally served by four elevators, one in each pier, which could fit only two to four people comfortably. Each custom-made hexagonal elevator cab covers about 10 square feet (0.93 m^{2}). One elevator was originally used exclusively by residents, while the other three were used by office tenants; the elevators skipped certain floors based on which quadrant they served. All four elevators could be either operated automatically or staffed by an elevator operator. There was no freight elevator because Wright thought it was redundant, given that the building's furnishings were mostly built-in. The residential elevator shaft is no longer used, and the cab has been removed to make way for additional ducts and wires. The building was constructed with a single, extremely narrow emergency-exit staircase, which is outdoors under a canopy. The design of the stair may have contributed to the building's abandonment in the late 20th century, as fire-safety regulations required at least two emergency-exit stairs.

=== Interior ===
The floor plan is laid out around a grid of parallelograms, each composed of four 30-60-90 triangles. The parallelograms measure 2 feet 10 5/8 inches (879 mm) on each side and are spaced 2 feet 6 inches (762 mm) apart. Each floor has a usable floor area of 1,900 square feet (180 m^{2}). On each floor, 1,150 square feet (107 m^{2}) were originally used for offices; the remaining space was part of an apartment. The Price Company had the offices on the 11th to 16th floors, while the offices on the 3rd to 10th floors were rented out. There were eight apartments, including the Prices' penthouse. The hallways are low, narrow corridors, while the rooms' ceilings descend to as low as 6 feet 9 inches (2.06 m) at the building's core. Due to the differing thicknesses of the floor slabs, the ceilings slope up toward the building's perimeter. As seen from the side, the sloping floor slabs resembled the branches of a tree.

Wright used a different color scheme on each floor, and he also designed the tower's fabric and wallpaper, which were part of his Taliesin Line. Wright designed furniture for the building and specific tenants, which was mostly assembled on site. The Price Tower's furniture is similar to pieces that Wright designed for his residential clients. Paul Goldberger of The New York Times described the tower's furniture as "geometric and almost futuristic". The lighting fixtures, ventilation grilles, and built-in furniture fit within the building's floor grid. Mahogany, aluminum, and tarnished copper were used in furniture throughout the building. Wright designed chairs with heavy aluminum bases, sloped arms, and hexagonal seatbacks, which were custom-made by Blue Stem Foundry in Dewey, Oklahoma, and failed to sell commercially. He also designed hexagonal trash cans, as well as aluminum dining chairs and built-in upholstered wood benches for the residences. Bruce Goff donated additional furniture for the building.

==== Lower stories ====
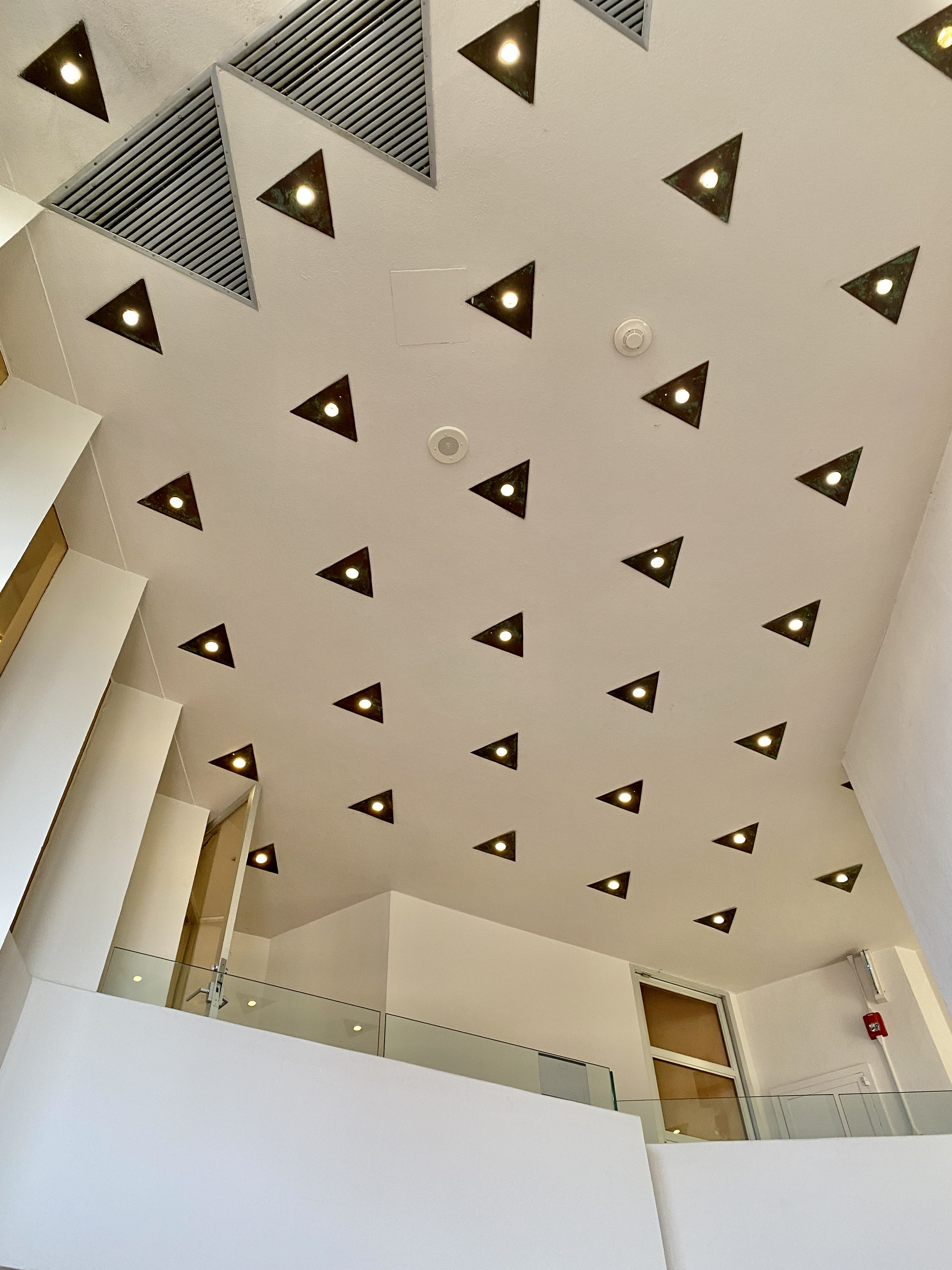
Lobby ceiling

The lobby has a newsstand and is accessed from the north via a driveway from Dewey Avenue, as well as from Sixth Street to the south. The floor is painted Cherokee red; the fluted, light-colored walls contain low seats. Inscribed on the walls are two quotes, adapted from the work of Walt Whitman; one from the concluding stanza of Salut au Monde, and the other from Song of the Broad-Axe. On the lobby's double-height ceiling are triangular lamps with copper frames and opaque glass panes. The second story is designed as an open-air mezzanine, running from west to east.

The two-story annex covers more than 10,000 square feet (930 m^{2}). It had offices for the Public Service Company of Oklahoma, as well as a superintendent's apartment with a living room, kitchen, bathroom, and bedroom. The superintendent's apartment subsequently became a catering room for the Price Tower Arts Center, while the offices became a lobby and welcome center. When the art center moved into the building, two partition walls and a restroom were added, and the second floor was converted into exhibition space. In addition, there is a basement with laundry, storage, and garbage rooms, and a sub-basement with elevator equipment.

==== Intermediate stories ====
The 3rd to 15th floors, which contained both offices and apartments, have very similar layouts. The southwestern quadrant was originally devoted to residential use with seven double-story apartments on the 3rd through 16th floors, each occupying approximately 982–986 ft^{2} (91.2–91.6 m^{2}). Generally, each apartment had a Cherokee-red floor, light-colored walls, and mahogany furniture. Although the main entrance of each apartment was on the lower level, the elevator provided access to both levels. Each apartment had a narrow entrance vestibule, with a stair leading to the upper level, as well as a small kitchen with various appliances, laminate counters, and a trash chute. The lower level also had a living–dining space, closets, and a bathroom. The upper level had two bedrooms overlooking the lower level, a bathroom and more closets. A glass skylight illuminated each apartment's upper level, and Wright and his assistant, Eugene Masselink, decorated the upper-level balustrade with copper artwork. Each apartment also had fireplaces located near the core and intended to celebrate Oklahoma's oil and gas reserves. Small balconies were placed on the exterior of each apartment. The apartments were later converted to offices.

The office space on the upper stories was designed so that it could be further subdivided; tenants could install partitions along the parallelogram grid. At the 16th story is an open terrace, buffet, and kitchen, occupying a setback in one quadrant. Because of the tower's small footprint, the Bartlesville Record wrote that "every unit of space [is] an outside unit". Wright's sketches indicate that the office spaces were to be furnished with hexagonal desks, in addition to triangular drawers with triangular knobs; at least some of these decorations were retained in the Price Company's offices. Wright added swivel chairs and U-shaped desks in other offices to minimize office workers' movement. Wright also designed removable glass and plywood partition walls, which were placed between the different offices and removed by the building's later occupants.

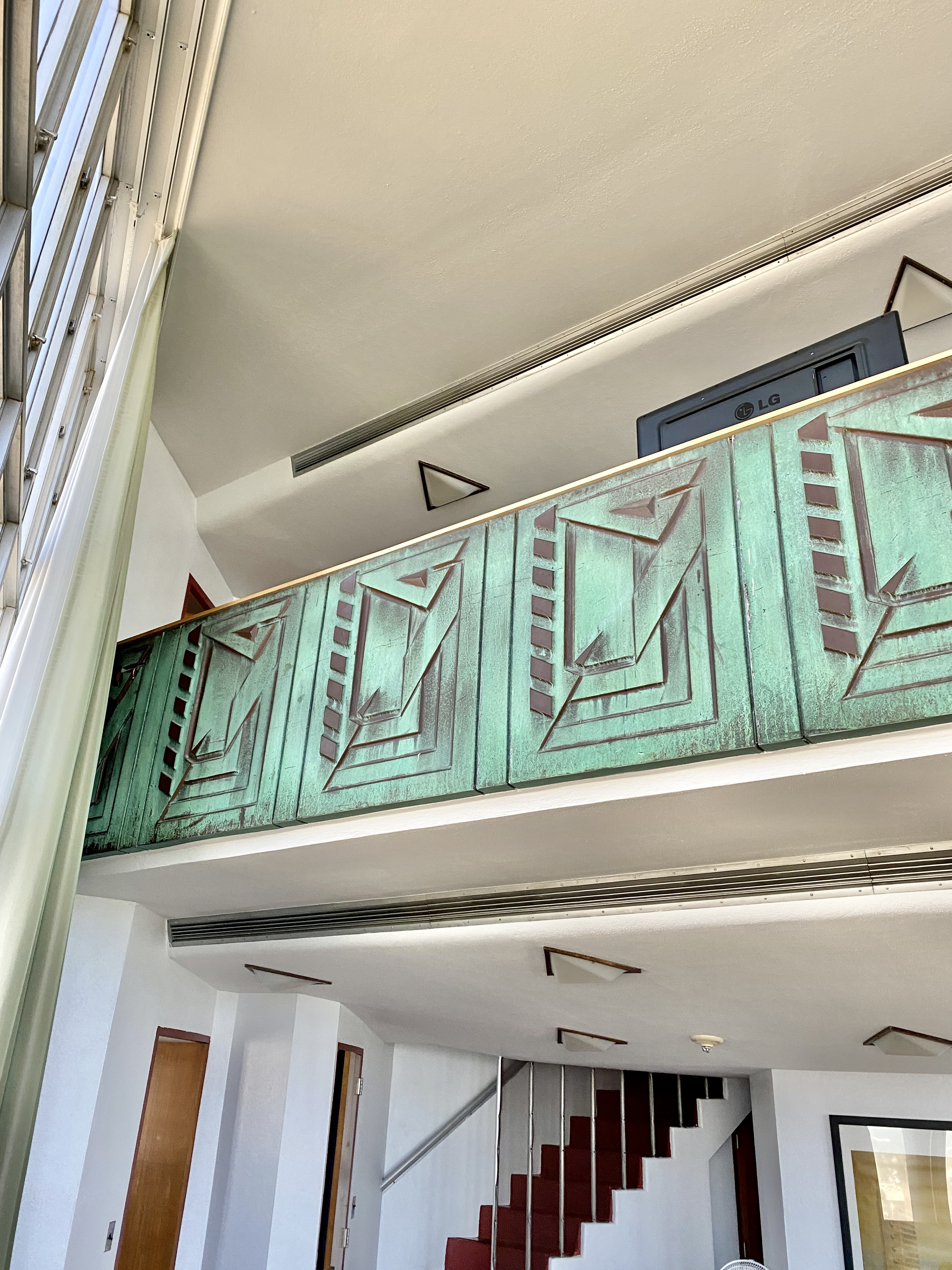
Decorative detail in one of the hotel rooms

By the 2000s, the 3rd to 6th floors had become offices for the PTAC. A boutique hotel named The Inn at Price Tower occupied the 7th to 14th floors, with 21 units in total. These include 18 single rooms and 3 duplex suites, (Note: According to a 2007 National Park Service report, the hotel was divided as follows: The 7th and 8th floors had six rooms and one suite.; The 9th and 10th floors had six rooms and one apartment.; The 11th to 14th floors had six rooms, two suites, and two offices.; Some sources give a conflicting figure of 19 units.) the latter of which were converted from apartments. Some of the hotel units were two-story spaces with sleeping lofts on a balcony level. The hotel had earth-toned upholstery, reflecting the building's original colors, in addition to furnishings and motifs inspired by Wright's original design. There were Tibetan rugs, green curtains, and maple furniture, along with copper-accented furniture. Furniture was manufactured on-site because the elevators were too small to accommodate new furniture. The modifications were designed so they could be easily reversed if the hotel closed; for example, showers were installed in existing closets. On the 7th to 14th floors, the apartments' original bathrooms and kitchens remain in place, but the other rooms on these stories have been modified.

The 15th and 16th stories were converted into Copper, a restaurant and bar, after the hotel opened. This bar had a copper countertop above a maple plywood counter, an allusion to the materials used in Wright's original furniture. The bar's shape referenced the curved facade of the Guggenheim Museum, which Wright also designed. In addition, the barstools and chairs were made of plywood and copper.

==== Penthouse ====
The top three stories originally functioned as an office and a duplex apartment for the Prices, occupying all four quadrants. The corporate office was in the middle of the 17th floor, and the Price family's living room occupies the same story. The corporate office includes a glass curtain wall and a full-height wood-burning fireplace. Wright designed a custom rolling chair for Harold Sr., along with four aluminum chairs for visitors. There was also a bronze lamp with a pebbled glass shade and a retractable banquette under Harold Sr.'s desk. Wright designed a mural called The Blue Moon, a reference to the phrase "once in a blue moon", used as a metaphor for rare occurrences. Wright said at the time that it was very rare for "the perfect design, perfect architect and perfect buyer" to be present on the same project. Outside Harold Sr.'s office was an office for his assistant, with a U-shaped desk and swivel chair. There is a terrace to the north and a roof garden to the south of Harold Sr.'s office.

The 18th floor includes a conference room and bedrooms for the Prices. The conference room provides a secondary entrance to the Price apartment, whose two bedrooms are accessed by a steep staircase. The 19th floor was used as an executive office and, unlike all the other stories, was not divided into quadrants. Eugene Masselink designed a glass mural for the wall of Price's 19th-floor office, which includes gold, copper, red, and turquoise hues. As planned, there was to be a rooftop kitchen and buffet area, an open terrace, and a television antenna above the 19th floor. The PTAC used the penthouse as a museum space after taking over.

== Arts center and hotel ==
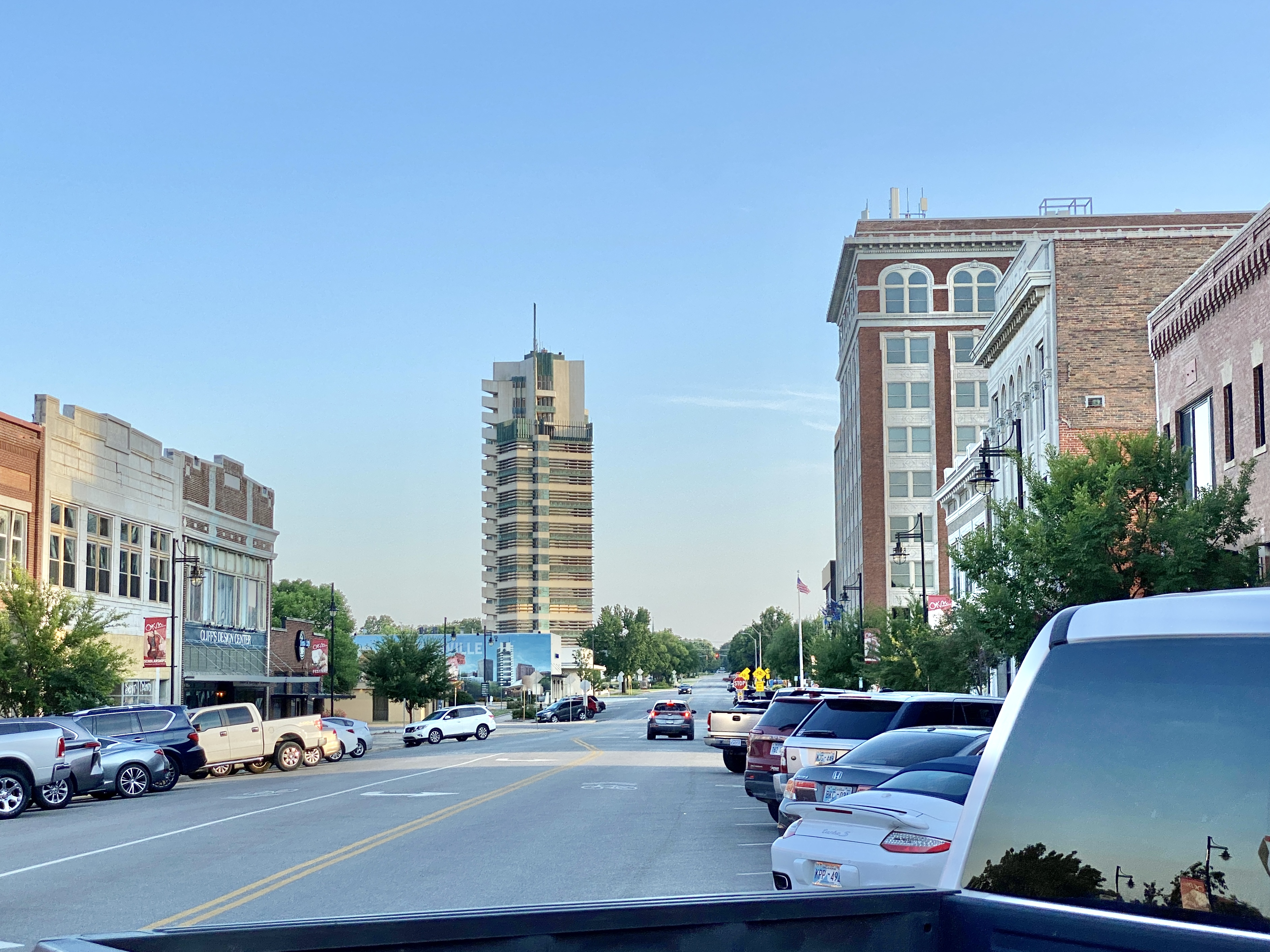
View from Dewey Avenue

The Price Tower Arts Center, the art complex at Price Tower, was founded in 1985 as a civic art museum and reorganized in 1998. It focused on art, architecture, and design, with works by Frederick Remington, various contemporary artists, and a particular emphasis on Wright's and Goff's architecture. There were also many objects collected by Bruce Goff, including 7,000 phonograph records, pieces of laundry, and paintings created using toothbrushes. In addition, the PTAC provided tours of the building, and operated summer camps for art and architecture.

Before the Inn at Price Tower closed in 2024, it was a member of Historic Hotels of America, the official program of the National Trust for Historic Preservation. Condé Nast listed the Inn at Price Tower as one of the world's 100 best hotels when it opened, and the hotel was on the 2021 list of Top 25 Historic Hotels of America Most Magnificent Art Collections.

== Impact ==
=== Reception ===
==== Contemporary ====
When plans for the Price Tower were announced in 1953, Architectural Forum magazine published a ten-page article about the planned building, saying that "Never has so tall an office building been built in so small a city." A writer for the Kansas City Times likened the Price Tower to a blade in shape, and Americas magazine wrote that Wright's ideas about skyscrapers were exemplified in the Price Tower. The Bartlesville Record predicted that the Price Tower would help bring good publicity to Oklahoma.

When the tower was completed, it was one of the most widely discussed buildings in the U.S., and was depicted in Newsweek and Fortune. The Christian Science Monitor said it was "one of the world's most modern buildings". Thomas W. Ennis of The New York Times called it a seeming "reversal of the natural order of things", and the Enid Daily Eagle named it "perhaps the most notable achievement in art in Oklahoma" during 1955. The Nowata, Oklahoma, Daily Star described the tower as "slim and graceful", and the Tulsa Tribune wrote it enhanced Bartlesville's downtown. The author Allan Temko said that, even though the Price Tower used generic mass-produced materials, it was a good example of Wright's organic architecture. Conversely, some critics likened the Price Tower to a hood ornament and a spaceship, and even derided it as "Price's folly". The British architectural writer Ian Nairn observed that the building was set back from the city's street grid and, thus, did not readily attract the attention of passersby.

The Bartlesville Morning Examiner wrote in 1957 that many publications had ranked the Price Tower among Wright's best works or among the best new buildings. Depictions of the tower were displayed at Expo 58 in Brussels, and the American Institute of Architects (AIA) also hosted an exhibit in Washington, D.C., with photos of the tower. The United States Information Agency displayed pictures of the Price Tower overseas as part of campaigns promoting Oklahoma. When Wright died in 1959, Walter H. Stern of The New York Times wrote that "to attribute a single architectural style to Mr. Wright would be a misjudgment of his art", citing the contrasts between the Price Tower and Wright's Taliesin studio.

==== Retrospective ====
The Price Tower received the Twenty-five Year Award from the AIA in 1983; as the AIA said, "The Price Tower is an embodiment of [Wright's] organic philosophy that buildings should grow out of the ground." The Price Tower was the third Wright–designed building to receive the award, after Taliesin West and the Johnson Wax Headquarters, and the first building in Oklahoma to be so recognized. The AIA's Oklahoma chapter also voted the Price Tower as one of the state's ten best buildings, and The Daily Oklahoman listed it as one of the few buildings in Oklahoma that had garnered national attention. A writer for Architecture: the AIA journal said in 1982 that "The very complexity of the building [...] gives particular identity to each space within". Although Paul Goldberger wrote that the Price Tower was "full of Wright's tense, energetic desire to break out of the box", he felt that it was not "a major building of the twentieth century" because it had languished as an unfinished project for too long. Jane Holtz Kay of The Christian Science Monitor wrote in 1983 that Wright had not been properly recognized for his work, even though the Price Tower and his other designs "make him a model for architecture's latest high-rise hipsters".

In 2003, The New York Times wrote that the Price Tower "presides over this city of 36,000 with a strange totemic power", while Architectural Record wrote that the building was "as much a social manifesto as a work of architecture". The architect Tadao Ando described the Price Tower as one of the most important 20th-century buildings. A writer for The Atlantic magazine described the building as "easily one of the more bizarre towers ever built". Observers also wrote about the small sizes of spaces such as elevators. Blair Kamin of the Chicago Tribune, reviewing the hotel rooms, felt them to be "an exemplary exercise in the art of respectful contrast" despite the cramped spaces. A writer for the Austin American-Statesman said in 2016 that the Price Tower was an "engineering marvel in the middle of the prairie" that architecture students, architects, and engineers came to visit.

=== Media ===
Shortly after the Price Tower was completed, Wright wrote a book about the building's construction, The Story of the Tower, in which he compared the floors to the branches of a tree. Joe Price, who produced a film about the tower's development, recalled that "the true building itself became visible to me" one day while the louvers were being installed on the facade. The book Prairie Skyscraper: Frank Lloyd Wright's Price Tower, published in 2005, includes essays and photographs of the building, and the 2014 book Frank Lloyd Wright: Preservation, Design, and Adding to Iconic Buildings also includes an essay about the Price Tower. Wendy Evans Joseph, who designed the building's hotel, also created a pop-up book featuring the tower.

=== Landmark designations ===
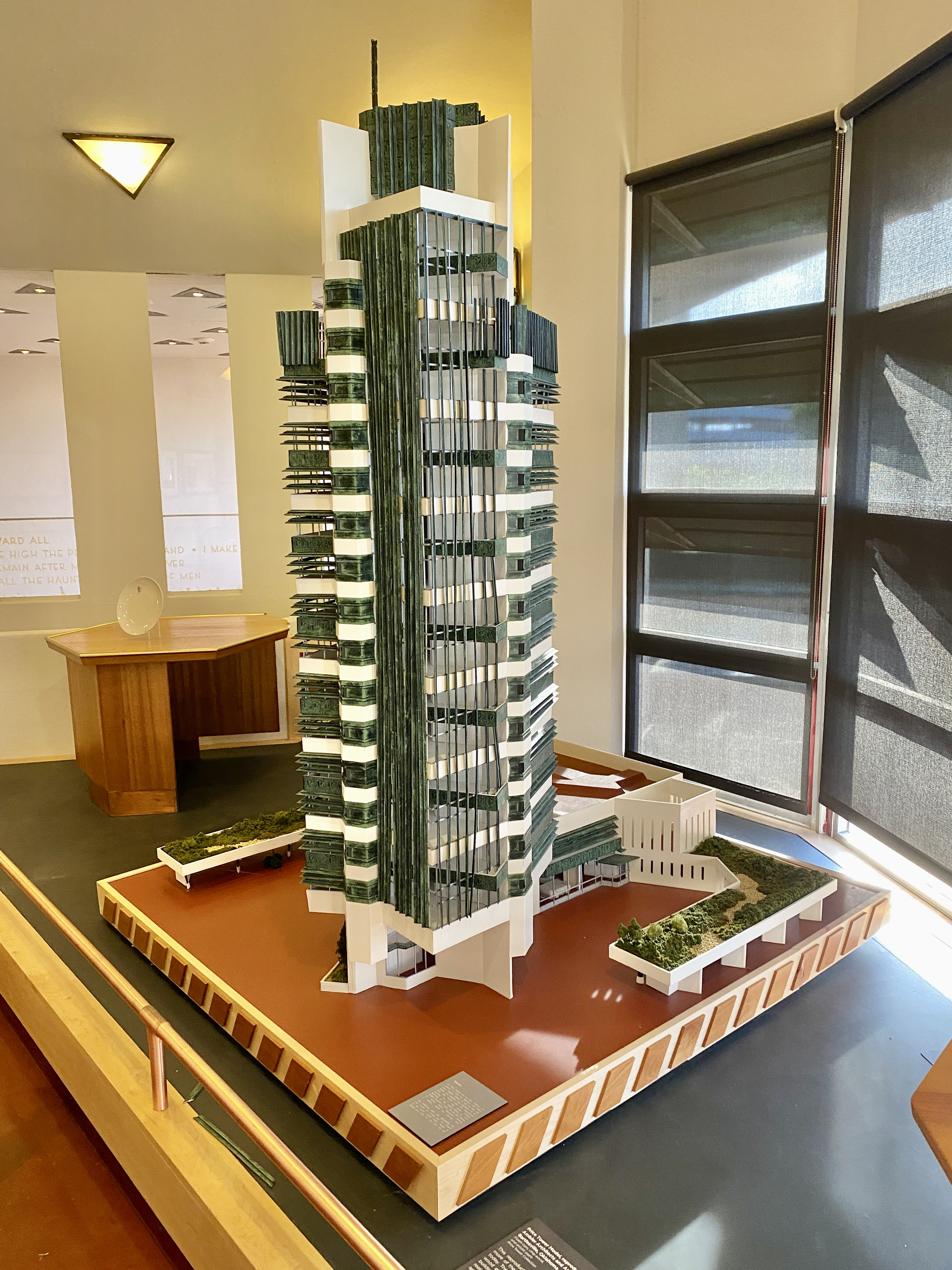
Model of the tower

The Price Tower was added to the National Register of Historic Places in 1974, joining LaQuinta, the Old Washington County Courthouse, and the Frank Phillips Home in Bartlesville. On March 29, 2007, the United States Department of the Interior designated the building as a National Historic Landmark, one of 20 such sites in Oklahoma at that time. The Interior Department described the structure as embodying "the powerful architectural idea of the cantilevered tower".

In 2008, the U.S. National Park Service submitted the Price Tower, along with nine other Frank Lloyd Wright properties, to a tentative list for World Heritage status. The Price Tower and ten other Wright buildings were renominated to the list in 2011. Ten buildings including the Price Tower were again nominated to the World Heritage List in 2015, but after the UNESCO World Heritage Committee rejected this nomination, the Price Tower was removed from the proposed listing. UNESCO ultimately added eight properties to the World Heritage List in July 2019 under the title "The 20th-Century Architecture of Frank Lloyd Wright"; the Price Tower was not one of them.

=== Exhibits and architectural influence ===
After the building was announced in 1953, models of it were displayed at Tulsa's Petroleum Exposition, Bartlesville's First National Bank, New York City's American Academy of Arts and Letters, and Guggenheim Museum. The building was also depicted in a 1954 exhibit about Wright's work at Los Angeles's Barnsdall Art Park, the Bartlesville Museum's first exhibit in 1990, and an exhibit at New York's Museum of Modern Art (MoMA) in 1994. In addition, a custom chair from the building was exhibited at the Pennsylvania Academy of the Fine Arts in 1991, and MoMA owns a model of the building. To celebrate the 50th anniversary of the tower's opening, the PTAC hosted a traveling exhibit on the building's history in 2005. The tower attracts visitors from around the world.

The St. Louis Post-Dispatch wrote that the building "has been imitated but never duplicated". The Price Tower's design may have inspired that of the Citizens Bank Tower (now The Classen) in Oklahoma City, which was designed by the architectural firm Bozalis & Roloff. Other projects based on the Price Tower's design include Domino's Pizza headquarters in Michigan, as well as Wright's Crystal Heights towers in Washington, D.C. Another of Wright's buildings, Point View Residences, also used a parallelogram floor grid, though that building was not finished during his lifetime. Wright's unfinished design for The Illinois, a mile-high skyscraper, was loosely derived from the cantilevered structure of the Price Tower and Tokyo's Imperial Hotel. The concept of mixed residential and office skyscrapers did gain popularity; Paul Goldberger of The New York Times described the Price Tower's mix of uses as having been copied by buildings such as the Olympic Tower and the Galleria in New York. The designs of other buildings, such as the interiors of the Bachman–Wilson House in Arkansas, The Arlington in North Carolina, and the Morton International Building in Illinois, were sometimes likened to that of the Price Tower.

Harold Jr. also commissioned Wright to design a house in Bartlesville, which became known as Hillside. The Usonian–style home has two stories and an L-shaped hipped roof. A third Wright building in Oklahoma is Westhope in Tulsa. The Price family, impressed with the Price Tower's construction, asked Wright to design a house in the desert in Phoenix, Arizona. The neighboring Bartlesville Community Center was designed by William Wesley Peters; the city's decision to hire Peters was influenced in part by the presence of the Price Tower. Reproductions of the tower's furniture have also been sold.

== See also ==
- List of Frank Lloyd Wright works
- List of National Historic Landmarks in Oklahoma
- National Register of Historic Places listings in Washington County, Oklahoma
