= X-Seed 4000 =

Proposed hypothetical arcology

- X-Sen Shushi 7000
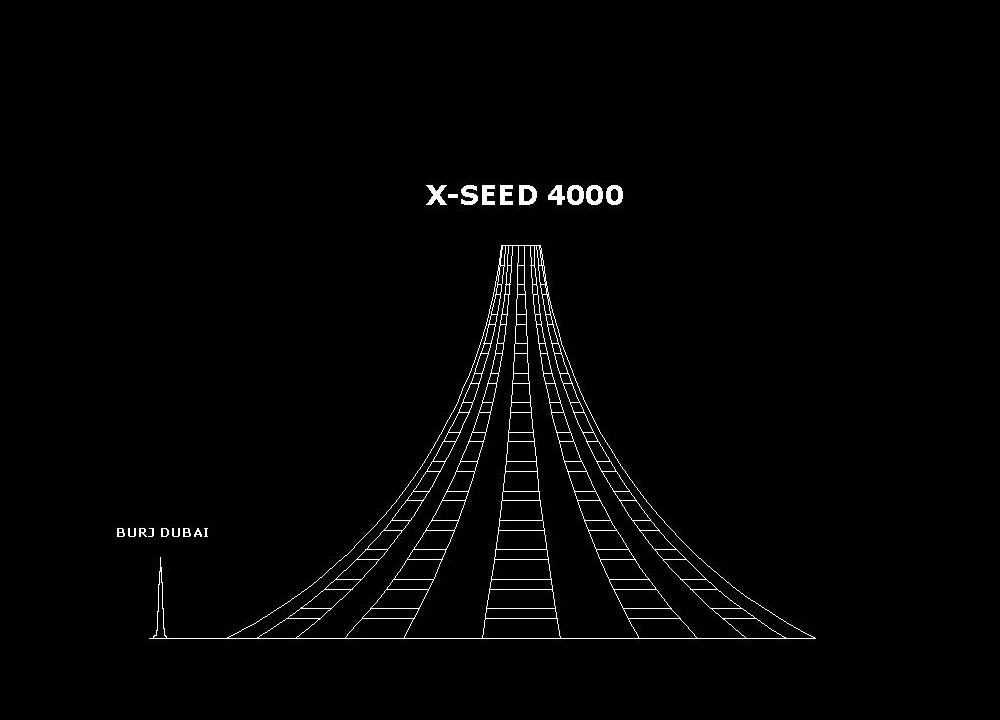
- Height comparison between the X-Seed 4000 and the Burj Khalifa

General information
- Status: Proposed
- Type: Mixed use
- Location: Tokyo, Japan
- Cost: 900B to 1.7T

Height
- Roof: 4,000 m (13,123 ft)

Technical details
- Floor count: 800

Design and construction
- Developer: Taisei Corporation

The X-Seed 4000 is a visionary concept for a megatall skyscraper. Its proposed 4-kilometre (2.5 mi) height, 6-kilometre-wide (3.7 mi) sea-base, and 800-floor capacity could accommodate 500,000–1,000,000 inhabitants. This structure would have been composed of over 3 million tonnes (3.3 million short tons) of steel.

It was designed for Tokyo, Japan, by the Taisei Corporation in 1995 as a futuristic environment combining ultra-modern and technological living and interaction with wildlife and nature. Methods of transportation within the X-Seed would most likely include Maglev trains.

Georges Binder, managing director of Buildings & Data, a firm which compiles data banks on buildings worldwide, said the X-Seed 4000 "is never meant to be built [...] the purpose of the plan was to earn some recognition for the firm, and it worked."

Unlike conventional skyscrapers, to remain habitable the X-Seed 4000 would have been forced to actively protect its occupants from considerable internal air pressure and external air pressure gradations and weather fluctuations that its massive elevation would cause. Its design called for the use of solar power to maintain internal environmental conditions. As the proposed site for the structure is located in the Pacific Ring of Fire, the most active volcano range in the world, the X-Seed 4000 would have been vulnerable to earthquakes and tsunamis.

A sea-based location and a Mount Fuji shape were some of this building's other major design features—Mount Fuji itself is 3,776 metres (12,388 ft) high, making it 224 metres (735 ft) shorter than the X-Seed 4000.

The X-Seed 4000 was projected to be twice the height of the Shimizu Mega-City Pyramid at 2,004 metres (6,575 ft). The Shimizu Mega-City Pyramid (also planned for Tokyo, Japan) faces most of the same problems as the X-Seed. Other projects that, if built, could be in the top five human-made structures are the Ultima Tower of 3,218 metres (10,558 ft) in San Francisco, Dubai City Tower of 2,400 metres (7,900 ft) and the Bionic Tower of 1,228 metres (4,029 ft) in either Hong Kong or Shanghai.

== See also ==
- Sky City 1000
- Sky Mile Tower
- Aeropolis 2001
- Shimizu Mega-City Pyramid
- List of records of Japan
- List of tallest buildings and structures in the world
- List of tallest structures in Japan
- List of visionary tall buildings and structures
