= Areopolis =

Areopolis may refer to:

Places and jurisdictions

- Hellenistic and Roman name of present Rabba, in modern Jordan
  - the above city's former bishopric and present Latin Catholic titular see
- Areopolis or Areopoli, a town on the Mani Peninsula, Laconia, peninsular Greece

== See also ==
- Aeropolis 2001, a high-rise building in Japan proposed in 1989
