= Sky City 1000 =

Proposed skyscraper in Japan

- スカイシティー1000
- Proposed Rendering of the megatall Sky City 1000

General information
- Status: Vision
- Type: Hotel, office, residential
- Location: Tokyo, Japan

Height
- Roof: 3,281 ft (1,000 m)

Technical details
- Floor count: 196
- Floor area: 8 km^{2}

Design and construction
- Architect: Takenaka Corporation

Sky City 1000 was a proposed skyscraper for the Tokyo metropolitan area. It was announced in 1989 at the height of the Japanese asset price bubble.

The proposal consisted of a building 1,000 m (3,281 ft) tall and 400 m (1,312 ft) wide at the base, with a total floor area of 8 km^{2} (3.1 sq mi). The design, proposed in 1989 by the Takenaka Corporation, would have housed between 35,000 and 36,000 full-time residents as well as 100,000 workers. It consisted of 14 dish-shaped "Space Plateaus" stacked one upon the other. The interior of the plateaus would have contained green space, and the edges of the building would have contained apartments. The building would also have housed offices, commercial facilities, schools, theatres, and other modern amenities.

Land prices in Japan were the highest in the world at the time, but Kisho Kurokawa, one of Japan's most famous architects, said that staggeringly ambitious buildings employing highly sophisticated engineering were still cheap, because companies would spend 90 percent of the budget for the land and only 10 percent for the building. Tokyo's only fire helicopter was even used in simulation tests to see what the danger would be if a fire were to break out in the building. To mitigate this, triple-decker high speed elevators were proposed and prototyped in labs outside Tokyo.

Although the Sky City gained more serious attention than many of its alternatives, it was never carried out, similar to projects such as X-Seed 4000 and to ultra-high density, mixed use concepts such as Paolo Soleri's Arcology and Le Corbusier's Ville Radieuse.

In recent years, Sky City 1000 has been referenced in architectural discussions, speculative design forums and academic literature as an example of unrealized urban megastructures highlighting the challenges and implications of constructing such large-scale vertical cities. If completed, Sky City 1000 would have been the tallest man-made structure in the world, surpassing the Burj Khalifa.

== History ==
In 2003, Sky City was featured on the Discovery Channel's Extreme Engineering.

In 2012, the Council on Tall Buildings and Urban Habitat (CTBUH) cited Sky City 1000 as one of several “visionary projects for vertical cities”. The proposed structure was designed to reach 1,000 meters in height and consist of 14 stacked “Space Plateaus”. It was intended to accommodate 36,000 residents and 100,000 workers, with integrated functions including residential, commercial, educational, and recreational spaces. The CTBUH also noted the project's “sustainable outlook that can help alleviate land problems and preserve the natural environment.”

== See also ==
- Bionic Tower
- Madinat al-Hareer
- Sky Mile Tower
- Shimizu Mega-City Pyramid
