= Rokuro Ishikawa =

Japanese businessman (1925–2005)

- 石川 六郎
- Born: 5 November 1925; Tokyo, Japan
- Died: 14 December 2005 (aged 80); Tokyo, Japan
- Education: University of Tokyo
- Occupations: Chairman of Kajima Corporation (1984-1993), Chairman of the Japan Chamber of Commerce and Industry (1987-1993)
- Spouse: Yoshiko Kajima
- Children: 2

Rokuro Ishikawa, D.Eng. (石川 六郎, Ishikawa Rokurō; 5 November 1925 – 14 December 2005) was a Japanese businessman and one of the most influential figures in the Japanese construction industry. He was Honorary Chairman of Kajima Corporation, one of the biggest construction companies in Japan, from 2005 until his death. Prior to that, he was president and chairman of Kajima Corporation. He was married to Yoshiko (née Kajima), a daughter of the fourth president and the founding family of Kajima, Morinoske Kajima. His father was Ichiro Ishikawa, the first Chairman of the Japan Business Federation.

Ishikawa held several senior positions in a number of prominent organizations. He served as chairman of the Japan Chamber of Commerce and Industry (JCCI) from 1987 to 1993, chairman of the Japan Federation of Construction Contractors, president of the Japan Society of Civil Engineers and president of the Japan Federation of Engineering Societies among others. An active member of the international community, Dr. Ishikawa served as head of the Japan - Midwest U.S. Association and the Pacific Basin Economic Council (PBEC), and participated as a senior member in management forums and missions to various countries around the world. He also chaired international friendship associations such as the Japan-Italy Association and the Japan-Egypt Friendship Association.

== Life ==
Ishikawa was born to an influential family in Tokyo, as a son of Ichiro Ishikawa, a former chairman of the Japan Business Federation and a managing director of a big chemical company (now, Nissan Chemical Industries after the merger). He graduated from Tokyo Imperial University(currently, Tokyo University) in 1948. After graduating from Tokyo University, Ishikawa joined the Department of Transportation (currently Ministry of Land, Infrastructure, Transport and Tourism) and became acquainted with Morinoske Kajima, fourth president of Kajima Corporation. Morinoske Kajima noticed his potential early on and they became close. In 1955, Dr. Ishikawa joined Kajima as a director. Dr. Ishikawa was convinced that nuclear energy was required to satisfy future energy demands in Japan and created a department for nuclear energy in Kajima soon after joining. In addition, he led many successful construction projects such as Kasumigaseki Building, the first skyscraper in Japan. In 1978, he took office as the seventh president of Kajima and swiftly introduced TQC (Total Quality Control) and promoted positive reforms in the company. He became chairman of Kajima in 1984 and in 1986, was awarded by the Government of Japan with Medals of Honor (Japan) with Blue Ribbon (藍綬褒章).

In May 1987, Dr. Ishikawa took office as the 15th president of the Japan Chamber of Commerce and Industry being strongly recommended by the 14th president, Noboru Goto. During his term, he was supportive of the consumption tax (VAT). He also held, among other positions, the position of Chairman of the Japan-Italy Association (日伊協会会長), Director of the Japan-Germany Association (日独協会理事), Director of the Japan-Belgium Association (日本・ベルギー協会理事), Director of Keio Engineering Society (慶應工学会), Senior Advisor to the ESUJ, Director of Japan Music Foundation (ジェスク音楽文化振興会, JESC), Senior Advisor to the Society for Promotion of Japanese Diplomacy (日本外交協会, SPJD) and Director of Japan Productivity Centre (日本生産性本部).

Dr. Ishikawa died on 14 December 2005 at the age of 80.

== Chronology ==
- 1925 – Born
- 1945 – Graduated from Tokyo University
- 1945 – Joined the Ministry of Land, Infrastructure and Transport
- 1955 – Joined Kajima Corporation as director
- 1957 – Appointed as managing director of Kajima Corporation
- 1959 – Appointed as vice-president of Kajima Corporation
- 1960 – Appointed as chairman of JCI -Japan
- 1974 – Appointed as representative of Japan Association of Corporate Executives
- 1978 – Appointed as president of Kajima Corporation
- 1982 – Appointed as chairman of the Association of Civil Engineering in Japan
- 1984 – Appointed as chairman of Kajima Corporation
- 1984 – Appointed as director of Japan Business Federation
- 1985 – Appointed as 5th chairman of Japan Federation of Construction Contractors
- 1986 – Awarded by the Government of Japan with Medals of Honor with Blue Ribbon
- 1987 – Appointed as chairman of the Japan Chamber of Commerce and Industry
- 1987 – Appointed as chairman of the Tokyo Chamber of Commerce and Industry
- 1987 – Appointed as chairman of Japan Society of Civil Engineers
- 1987 – Appointed as director of New Japan Philharmonic
- 1988 – Appointed as 13th chairman of the International Chamber of Commerce and Industry – Japan
- 1991 – Appointed as chairman of the Japan Federation of Engineering Societies
- 1991 – Appointed as 14th chairman of Japan Table Tennis Association
- 1992 – Awarded by the Government of Peru with an Order of the Sun (Peru) (太陽勲章大十字位)
- 1994 – Appointed as honorary chairman of Kajima Corporation
- 1995 – Appointed as chairman of Tokyo University Alumni Association (東京銀杏会)
- 1997 – Appointed as 7th honorary chairman of Japan Table Tennis Association
- 2000 – Awarded by the Government of Italy with a Cavaliere di Gran Croce (1st Class Knight Grand Cross)
- 2005 – Death

== Family ==
Name	Relationship	Comments
Ichiro Ishikawa	Father	First Chairman of Japan Business Federation (日本経済団体連合会)
Kaoru Ishikawa	Brother	Eldest son of Ichiro Ishikawa, an emeritus professor of Tokyo University and influential quality management innovator best known in North America for the Ishikawa diagram (also known as fishbone diagram). He married second daughter of Seikichi Ujiie, a former President of the 77 Bank Limited.
Yoshiko	Wife	Daughter of Morinoske Kajima
Morinoske Kajima	Father-in-law	Morinoske Kajima is a famous Japanese diplomat, businessman and politician. He is a former chairman of Kajima Corporation.
Itsuko Atsumi	Sister-in-law	Daughter of Morinoske Kajima and wife of Takeo Atsumi; Her son Naoki Atsumi is married to Mieko, second daughter of Yasuhiro Nakasone, a former Prime Minister of Japan.
Shoichi Kajima	Brother-in-law	Director and Senior Advisor of Kajima Corporation
Yumiko	Daughter	Archaeologist
Hiroshi	Son	Director of Kajima Corporation
