= Wendy Evans Joseph =

American architect (born 1955)

Wendy Evans Joseph FAIA, LEED AP
- Born: Wendy Evans; 1955 (age 70–71)
- Education: University of Pennsylvania, Harvard University
- Occupations: Architect; Interior designer
- Spouse: Jeffrey V. Ravetch (2001—present)
- Awards: Rome Prize in Architecture, 1984
- Practice: Joseph Studio
- Projects: Greenporter Hotel and Spa; The Women's Museum
- Design: Inn at Price Tower

Wendy Evans Joseph is an American architect known for her work on placemaking and exhibition design, primarily for cultural and educational institutions, as well as private residences, and performance spaces. Joseph's notable projects include the Rockefeller University’s Campus Community Pedestrian Bridge, her renovation of the Snug Harbor Music Hall, her "Americans" exhibition at the National Museum of the American Indian, and the "Nature—Cooper Hewitt Design Triennial" at the Cooper Hewitt, Smithsonian Design Museum in 2019. Joseph is the president of the National Academy of Design, and a fellow of the American Institute of Architects (FAIA).

== Early life and education ==
Joseph was born in 1955 to Melvin I. Evans and Fran R. Evans. She studied at the University of Pennsylvania and graduated with Bachelor of Arts in 1977. She then worked for the architectural firm Architectural Resources Cambridge for a year before getting into Harvard University Graduate School of Design where she was awarded two prizes for her thesis: the Henry Adams Medal from the American Institute of Architects and the James Templeton Kelley Thesis Prize. She graduated with a Master in Architecture in 1981.

== Career ==
After graduate school Joseph she worked with Pei Cobb Freed & Partners, where she stayed for twelve years, including seven years as a senior associate. In 1984 she was a fellow at the American Academy in Rome. In 1996, she launched her architectural practice, Joseph Studio.

Joseph is a former president of the Architectural League of New York, and was the president of the New York chapter of the American Institute of Architects until 2000. As of 2025 Joseph is the president of the National Academy of Design.

== Projects ==
In the early eighties Joseph worked on the United States Holocaust Memorial Museum as a senior designer. In 1996 she was featured in an article in Working Woman, which caught the eye of Cathy Bonner who was coordinating the design for a museum in Dallas, and as a result Joseph was hired to design The Women's Museum that was completed in 2000. In 2000 she was hired by the National Jazz Museum in Harlem.

In 2003, she designed the interiors of Inn at Price Tower, which is located inside the Frank Lloyd Wright skyscraper, Price Tower. This work was honored with a Business Week/Architectural Record award in 2003.Other projects led by Joseph include the Rockefeller University’s Campus Community Pedestrian Bridge, the National Butterfly Center in Mission, Texas, the renovation of the Music Hall of the Snug Harbor Cultural Center in Staten Island, NY, Americans' exhibition at the National Museum of the American Indian that opened in 2017, and Nature–Cooper Hewitt Triennial at the Cooper Hewitt Smithsonian Design Museum in 2019.

== Selected publications ==
- Joseph, Wendy Evans; Goldberger, Paul (2009). Pop Up Architecture. New York: Melcher Media, Inc. ISBN 978-1-59591-060-8.

== Awards and honors ==
Joseph received the Rome Prize in architecture from the American Academy in Rome in 1984. She was elected a fellow of the American Institute of Architects in 2013. In 2012 she was elected academician of the National Academy of Design.

== Personal life ==
Joseph's second husband, Peter Joseph, died in 1998; they lived in Long Island. In 2001, she married Jeffrey V. Ravetch, a professor of molecular genetics and immunology at Rockefeller University; as of 2011 they lived in Manhattan. In 2002 Joseph designed an observatory for Ravetch's son, Ethan.
