= Jeffrey V. Ravetch =

- Born: 1951 (age 74–75)
- Education: Yale University; Rockefeller University; Cornell University Medical School
- Spouse: Wendy Evans Joseph
- Awards: Wolf Prize in Medicine
- Scientific career
- Workplaces: Memorial Sloan-Kettering Cancer Center; Rockefeller University

Jeffrey Victor Ravetch (born 1951) is a professor and head of the Laboratory of Molecular Genetics and Immunology at The Rockefeller University.

== Background and training ==
Ravetch earned his B.S. degree at Yale University in 1973 in molecular biophysics and biochemistry working with Donald Crothers on the thermodynamic and kinetic properties of synthetic oligoribonucleotides. He received a Ph.D. from The Rockefeller University in 1978 in bacterial genetics working in the laboratory of Norton Zinder and Peter Model in the Laboratory of Genetics at Rockefeller and an M.D. from Cornell University Medical School in 1979. He completed postdoctoral studies at the National Institutes of Health with Philip Leder, where he identified and characterized the genes for human antibodies and the DNA elements involved in switch recombination. From 1982 to 1996 Dr. Ravetch was a member of the faculty of Memorial Sloan-Kettering Cancer Center and Cornell Medical College. Currently, Ravetch is the Theresa and Eugene M. Lang Professor in the Leonard Wagner Laboratory of Molecular Genetics and Immunology at The Rockefeller University.

== Summary of research achievements ==
Ravetch revealed the mechanisms by which antibodies mediate and regulate their diverse in vivo effector functions through the characterization of the structural and functional diversity of the Fc region and their interactions with the family of Fc receptors he defined. His studies have focused on the redesign of antibodies to enhance their therapeutic capacity for the treatment of infectious, neoplastic and inflammatory diseases.

== Awards ==
- William B. Coley Award, Cancer Research Institute, 2007
- Gairdner International Award, 2012
- Sanofi-Institut Pasteur Award, 2012,
- Honorary Doctorate, Friedrich-Alexander-University Erlangen-Nürnberg, 2013
- Wolf Prize in Medicine, 2015
- Ross Prize in Molecular Medicine, 2017
- Robert Koch Medal and Award, 2018

=== Memberships ===
- National Academy of Sciences, 2006
- Institute of Medicine, 2007
