= Kajima =

Japanese construction company

Kajima Corporation

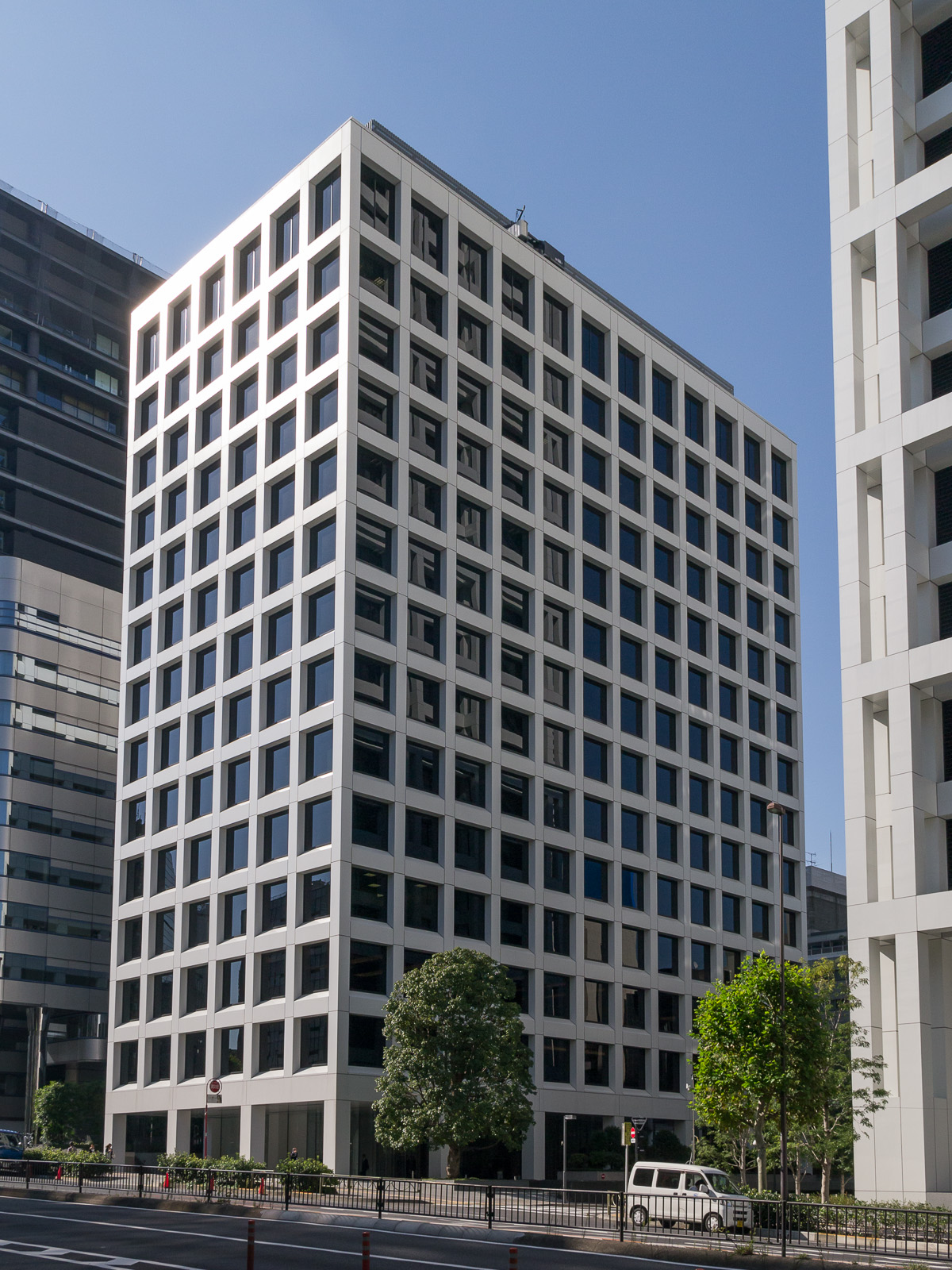
- Native name: 鹿島建設株式会社
- Romanized name: Kajima Kensetsu kabushiki gaisha
- Type: Public (K.K)
- Traded as: TYO: 1812; NAG: 1812; OSE: 1812 until 2013; Nikkei 225 Component
- Industry: Construction; Engineering; Design
- Founded: Tokyo, Japan (1840)
- Headquarters: 3-1, Motoakasaka 1-chome, Minato, Tokyo 107-8388, Japan
- Area served: Worldwide
- Key people: Morinosuke Kajima (Chairman (1957-1975)), Rokuro Ishikawa (Chairman (1983 -1993) and Honorary Chairman)
- Services: Architectural design; Civil engineering design; Construction (civil engineering and building construction); Engineering; Real estate development
- Revenue: ▲$ 15.798 billion USD (FY 2012) (¥ 1485.01 billion JPY) (FY 2012)
- Net income: ▲$ 249.255 million USD (FY 2012) (¥ 23.42 billion JPY) (FY 2012)
- Number of employees: 7,737 (non-consolidated); 15,468 (consolidated) (as of March 31, 2013)
- Website: Official website

Kajima Corporation (鹿島建設株式会社, Kajima Kensetsu Kabushiki-gaisha) is one of the oldest and largest construction companies in Japan. Founded in 1840, the company has its headquarters in Motoakasaka, Minato, Tokyo. The company is known for its DIB-200 proposal. The company stock is traded on four leading Japanese stock exchanges and is a constituent of the Nikkei 225 stock index.

Kajima's services include design, engineering, construction, and real estate development. Kajima builds high-rise structures, railways, power plants, dams, and bridges. Its subsidiaries are located throughout Asia, Oceania, Europe, and North America. A downturn in the construction industry during the latter half of the 1990s prompted Kajima to expand its operations to the environmental sector, specifically waste treatment, water treatment, soil rehabilitation, and environmental consulting.

== History ==
- 1840 - Iwakichi Kajima, the founder of the present-day company begins carpentry business in Edo (present day Tokyo)
- 1860 - Kajima pioneers first western-style building in Yokohama (Ei-Ichiban Kan)
- 1880 - Establishes Kajima Gumi
- 1899 - Railway construction projects begin in Korea and Taiwan
- 1923 - Great Kantō earthquake - Kajima participates in the reconstruction work
- 1930 - Incorporation of the company (issues stock, capitalized at 3 million yen)
- 1944 - 986 Chinese labourers forcibly conscripted to build a canal at Hanaoka mine, together with Allied POWs
- 1945 - SCAP investigation finds 418 of the Chinese slave labourers perished at Hanaoka, a far higher percentage than at other forced labor camps in Japan, including 113 killed during the Hanaoka mine incident. Three Kajima supervisors are found guilty of Class B and C war crimes and sentenced to death.
- 1947 - Asia's first high-speed chairlift constructed at Shiga Kogen ski area
- 1949 - Memorial constructed to Chinese victims of Kajima killed at Hanaoka mine Kajima Technical Research Institute founded (the first construction research facility in Japan)
- 1950 - Pioneers first joint venture with Morrison-Knudsen
- 1957 - Completes Japan's first nuclear reactor (Japan Atomic Energy Research Institute's Tōkai JRR-1 reactor)
- 1959 - Construction of the Tokaido Shinkansen begins
- 1961 - The company is listed on Tokyo and Osaka Stock Exchanges
- 1963 - Becomes world no. 1 in construction (total contract value)

Constructs facilities for 1964 Tokyo Olympic Games

- 1964 - Establishment of Kajima International Incorporated (KII) in Los Angeles, California, U.S.
- 1968 - Japan's first high-rise building, the Kasumigaseki Building, is completed
- 1975 - Founds PT. Waskita Kajima, as a joint venture with Waskita Karya
- 1987 - Establishment of Kajima Europe B.V. (KE) in the Netherlands
- 1988 - Establishment of Kajima Overseas Asia Pte Ltd. (KOA) in Singapore

The Seikan Tunnel, the world's longest tunnel, is completed

- 1994 - United States Department of Justice sues Kajima Doro for bid-rigging in connection with the construction of the Atsugi Naval Air Facility. Construction of Kansai International Airport is finalized
- 1998 - Akashi Kaikyo Bridge is completed

Bought Waskita Karya's shareholding in Waskita Kajima, resulting Kajima as majority shareholder of the company. The company then renamed to Kajima Indonesia

- 2000 - $4.6 million compensation fund established for forced labourers at Hanaoka mine.
- 2001 - The Suez Canal Bridge is completed
- 2002 - Hawaiian Dredging is acquired from Dillingham Construction.
- 2003 - Establishment of Kajima (Shanghai) Construction Co., Ltd.
- 2007 - Kajima executives charged with bid-rigging in connection with construction on the Nagoya subway.
- 2010 - Construction of Resorts World Sentosa in Singapore completed
- 2011 - The company completed the construction of the Dubai Metro (phase 1 and 2)
- 2017 - Purchased Australian construction company Icon Construction
- 2018 - Criminal indictment issued against Kajima Corporation by the Fair Trade Commission
- 2021 - Kajima Corporation found guilty of bid-rigging in construction of the Chūō Shinkansen.

== Demolition technology ==
The Kajima Corporation developed a building demolition technique that involves using hydraulic jacks to demolish a building one floor at a time. This method is safer, and allows for a more efficient recycling process. In the Spring of 2008, the Kajima Corporation used this technique to demolish a 17-story and 20-story building, recycling 99% of the steel and concrete and 92% of the interior materials in the process.

== Film backing ==
The Kasumigaseki Building, built by Kajima, is the main subject of the film Chōkōsō no Akebono, which was backed by Kajima.

== Scandal ==
On March 2, 2018, the head of a division at Kajima was arrested by an investigative team from the Tokyo District Public Prosecutors Office on suspicion of having violated the Act on Prohibition of Private Monopolization and Maintenance of Fair Trade in connection with bidding for the Chūō Shinkansen maglev line. On March 23, the Fair Trade Commission issued a criminal indictment against both the head of the division and Kajima Corporation.
