= DIB-200 =

General information
- Status: Vision
- Type: Mixed Use
- Location: Tokyo, Japan
- Construction started: -
- Estimated completion: -
- Opening: -

Height
- Roof: 800 m (2,600 ft)

Technical details
- Floor count: 200

Design and construction
- Architects: Sadaaki Masuda; Scott Howe
- Developer: Kajima Construction

DIB-200 is a possible mixed use megatall skyscraper project proposed by Kajima Construction for Tokyo, Japan, designed by Sadaaki Masuda and Scott Howe. If constructed, it would be 800 metres (2,625 ft) tall. The name stands for Dynamic Intelligent Building of 200 stories.

The design consists of 12 cylindrical modules 50 metres (164 ft) across and 200 metres (656 ft) long, which are stacked one on top of the other to form four towers that rise to different heights from the corners of a quadrangle at the base. One tower is two modules high, two towers are three modules high, and the fourth tower consists of four modules and climbs the full 800 metres. The modular design would help keep down costs and make technical problems more manageable. The gaps between the modules are designed to reduce wind loading on the structure.

The design has been criticized for looking as if it owes more to engineering pragmatism than architectural flair. However, Sadaaki Masuda claims that they could do little to influence the overall appearance of DIB-200 once the module had been designed and the parameters agreed upon. He believes his company is right to want a technically feasible scheme that, however ambitious, is realistic by today's standards. Scott Howe sees their contribution as helping to make the building a pleasant place for a population equivalent to that of a medium-sized town.

The first two tiers provide office space for about 50,000 people. On the third tier, there will be a hotel with 2,500 rooms, while the top tier is a residential block for more than 300 homes. Despite the structure's extraordinary height, Howe talks of "putting some horizontal into the building", of "artificial ground levels and no bottlenecks moving up and down the building". People will use high-speed lifts to shuttle between tiers, and slower ones to reach individual floors. Though Kajima is sticking with proven technology, it is taking conventional lift design to the limit with cables as long as 600 metres to provide the building's most direct service. Between tiers, horizontal sky lobbies will link the towers, and contain shops, sports and cultural centres.
