= Shimizu Mega-City Pyramid =

Proposed arcology project in Japan

- 清水TRY-2004メガシティピラミッド
- The Pyramid City arcology or megacity as featured on the Discovery Channel's Extreme Engineering programs

General information
- Status: Proposed
- Type: Office, Residential, Research, Leisure
- Location: Tokyo Bay, Japan
- Construction started: 2030 (proposed)
- Estimated completion: 2110

Height
- Roof: 2,004 m (6,575 ft)

Technical details
- Floor area: 8 square kilometres (3.1 mi^{2})

Design and construction
- Architects: Dante Bini, David Dimitric
- Developer: Shimizu Corporation

The Shimizu TRY 2004 Mega-City Pyramid is a proposed Shimizu Corporation project for the construction of a massive self-sustaining arcology-pyramid over Tokyo Bay in Japan that would have businesses, parks, and other services contained within the building. The structure would house 1,000,000 people. The structure would be 2,004 meters (6,575 feet) high, including five stacked trusses, each with similar dimensions to that of the Great Pyramid of Giza. This pyramid would help answer Tokyo's increasing lack of space, although the project would only handle a small fraction of the population of the Greater Tokyo Area.

The proposed structure is so large that it could not be built with current conventional materials, due to their weight. The design relies on the future availability of super-strong lightweight materials based on carbon nanotubes and graphene presently being researched. The plan was to start construction in 2030, but no further action has been taken. Shimizu is still determined to complete the project by 2110; if built, it would make history as the largest man-made structure in world history. This would also mean that the construction would last for 80 years.

== History ==
Tokyo has been having issues in regard to overpopulation, due to internal migration, among other causes. The Shimizu Corporation, which has been located in Tokyo since the Edo period, witnessed it firsthand. They had an idea for a solution that was different from other proposed ideas. It started in 1982, when one of the employees went to see Blade Runner and saw the opening scene showing the two pyramids the Tyrell Corporation operated from. The architectural marvel amazed the engineer, who told his other colleagues about it the following day, leading to the idea for the Mega-City pyramid. 10 years later, in October 1992, representatives travelled to patent offices the world over to patent their idea internationally.

== Materials and construction process ==
The pyramid's foundation would be formed by 36 piers made of special concrete.

Because the seismically active Pacific Ring of Fire cuts right through Japan, the external structure of the pyramid would be an open network of megatrusses, supporting struts made from carbon nanotubes to allow the pyramid to stand against and let through high winds, and survive earthquakes and tsunamis. The trusses would be coated with photovoltaic film to convert sunlight into electricity and help power the city. The city would also be powered by pond scum or algae.

Robotic systems are planned to play a major part in both construction and building maintenance.

== Interior traffic and buildings ==
Transportation within the city would be provided by accelerating walkways, inclined elevators, and a personal rapid transit system where automated pods would travel within the trusses.

Housing and office space would be provided by twenty-four or more 30-story high skyscrapers suspended from above and below and attached to the pyramid's supporting structure with nanotube cables.

== See also ==
- Arcology
- Megacity
- Sky City 1000
- X-Seed 4000
- Proposed tall buildings and structures
- Ziggurat Pyramid, Dubai
