= Sky Mile Tower =

Approved megatall skyscraper in Tokyo, Japan

- スカイマイルタワー

General information
- Status: Vision
- Type: Mixed-use
- Location: Tokyo, Japan

Height
- Antenna spire: 1,700 m (5,577 ft)
- Roof: 1,700 m (5,577 ft)

Technical details
- Floor count: 421
- Floor area: 1,375,000 m^{2} (14,800,377 ft^{2})

Design and construction
- Architects: Kohn Pedersen Fox Associates; Leslie E. Robertson Associates

The Sky Mile Tower (スカイマイルタワー, Sukai Mairu Tawā) is an envisioned 1,700 m (5,577 ft) skyscraper building intended to be built in Tokyo, Japan.

The design of the tower is part of an initiative called Next Tokyo 2045 for research and developmental purposes and was made by Kohn Pedersen Fox Associates and Leslie E. Robertson Associates.

The Sky Mile Tower would be built on an archipelago of reclaimed land in Tokyo Bay. This proposed reclamation project with the Sky Mile Tower as its centrepiece is dubbed as "Next Tokyo". The building is designed to be occupied by around 55,000 people and is planned to be 1,700 m (5,577 ft) high.

Representatives from Next Tokyo believe the value of new waterfront properties in Tokyo Bay could help pay for the project's construction, should the proposal go through.

As of April 22, 2023, the webpage on KPF's website describing the project has been removed. It is still mentioned on Leslie E. Robertson Associates' website.

== See also ==
- List of buildings with 100 floors or more
- List of future tallest buildings
- Sky City 1000
- Proposed tall buildings and structures
