= Bionic Tower =

Visionary vertical city

- 仿生塔
- Computer rendering of the Bionic Tower

General information
- Status: Proposed
- Type: Residential, Retail
- Location: Shanghai or Hong Kong, as both locations have the interest
- Cost: US$16 billion+

Height
- Height: 1,228 m (4,029 ft)

Technical details
- Floor count: 300
- Lifts/elevators: 368 elevators (15 m/s, with vertical and horizontal movement)

The Bionic Tower (Spanish: Torre Biónica; Chinese: 仿生塔) is an imagined vertical city, designed for human habitation by Spanish architects Eloy Celaya, María Rosa Cervera and Javier Gómez. It would have a main tower 1,228 metres (4,029 ft) high, with 300 stories housing approximately 100,000 people. The purpose of the Bionic Tower was to utilize bionics to address the issue of the world's rising population in an eco-friendly manner.

The Bionic Tower would be exactly 400 meters taller than the current tallest building, the Burj Khalifa and 220 taller than the Jeddah Tower.

The Bionic Tower is composed of two complexes. The first complex, Bionic Tower, is made up of twelve vertical neighborhoods, each eighty meters in height. The neighborhoods are separated by safety areas, designed to make for easier construction and evacuation in the case of emergency. Each neighborhood has two groups of buildings, one on the interior of the building and one on the exterior. Both groups of buildings are situated around large gardens and pools. The second complex, called the Base Island, is 1,000 meters in diameter, and is made up of many buildings, gardens, pools, and communication infrastructures. Foreseen uses of these complexes include hotels, offices, residential, commerce, cultural, sports and leisure.

In 1997, work on the prototype Bionic Vertical Space began. This was developed by the architects Eloy Celaya, María Rosa Cervera and Javier Gómez through the beginning of 2001. Eloy Celaya, who studied at Columbia University, is developing another project similar to the Bionic Tower.

While in office, then-Shanghai mayor Xu Kuangdi expressed an interest in the concept for his city. Hong Kong also reportedly expressed interest in the project.

== Specifications ==
- Authorship: Spanish architects Eloy Celaya, María Rosa Cervera and Javier Gómez
- Urban model: Vertical city
- Inhabitants: 100,000
- Height: 1,228 m (4,029 ft)
- Floors: 300
- Elevators: 368 elevators (15 m/s or 49 ft/s), with vertical and horizontal movement)
- Footprint: 133 m (436 ft) × 110 m (361 ft) at base, expanding to 166 m (545 ft) × 133 m (436 ft) max
- Area: 2,000,000 m^{2} (21,528,000 sq ft)
- Artificial base island: 1 km (0.6 mi) diameter
- Structure: Micro-structured high strength concrete (2 tons/cm^{3} or 1,372 MPa)
- Maximum sway: 2.45 m (8 ft) lateral displacement
- Technology: Bionic vertical space
- Cost: US$16 billion+
- Location: Shanghai or Hong Kong

== See also ==
- List of tallest buildings in Hong Kong
- List of tallest buildings in Shanghai
- List of buildings with 100 floors or more
- Arcology
- Proposed tall buildings and structures
