= Trump International Hotel and Tower (Dubai) =

Future hotel and residence tower in the UAE

Trump International Hotel & Tower
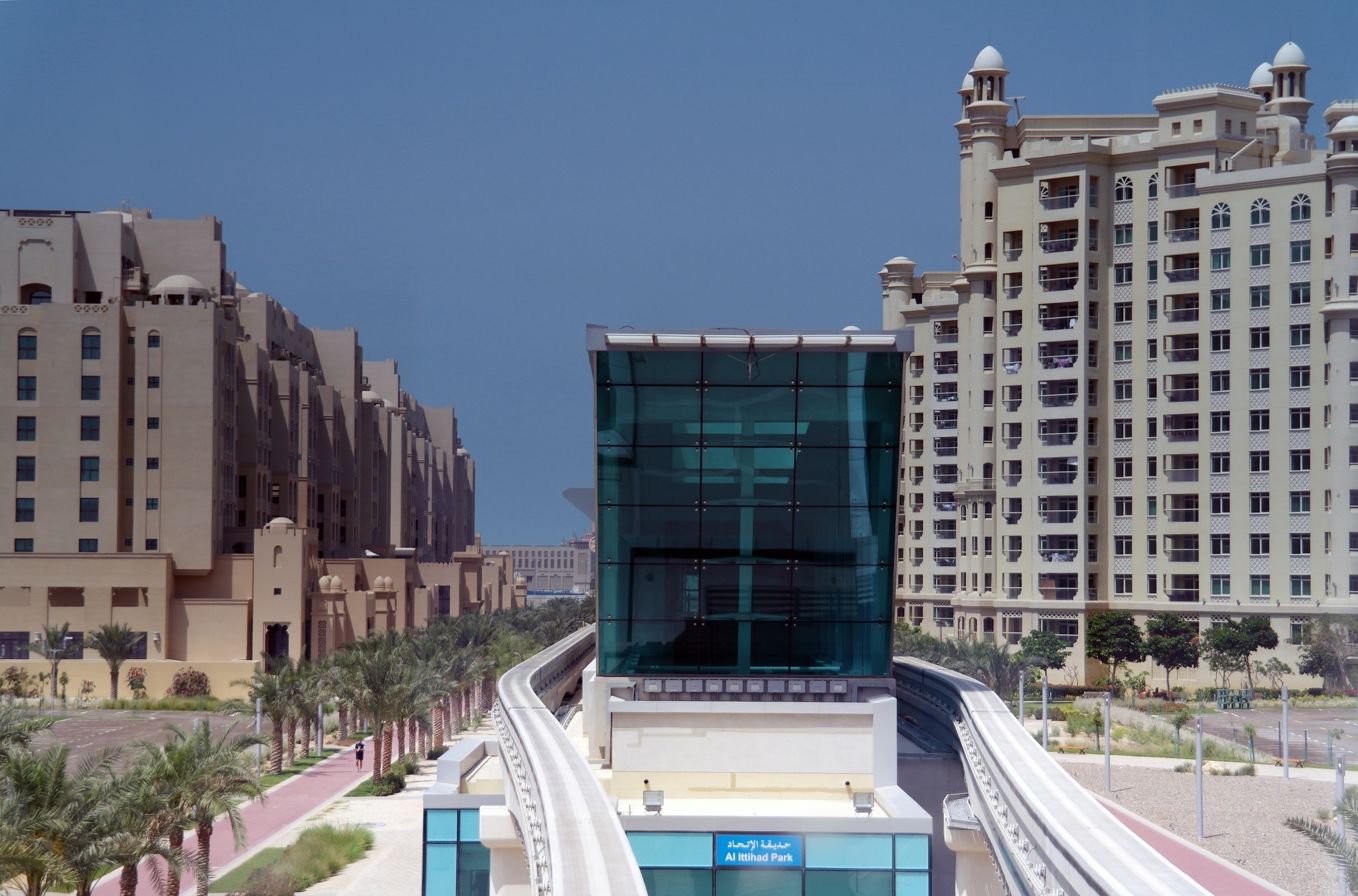
- The Al Ittihad Park (formerly Trump Tower) monorail station on the Palm Jumeirah, located at the proposed site of the skyscraper
- Interactive map of the Trump International Hotel & Tower area

General information
- Status: Under Construction
- Type: Residential; Hotel
- Location: Dubai, United Arab Emirates
- Coordinates: 25°06′36″N 55°08′40″E
- Construction started: November 29, 2025
- Completed: 31 December 2030
- Cost: US$600 million

Height
- Roof: 350 m (1,150 ft)

Technical details
- Floor count: 80

Design and construction
- Architect: Nikken Sekkei
- Developer: Dar Al Arkan; DarGlobal; The Trump Organization

The Trump International Hotel & Tower is a future skyscraper hotel and residential complex at the trunk of the Palm Jumeirah in Dubai. The tower was originally announced on October 5, 2005 as a joint venture between the Trump Organization and Dubai-based Nakheel, a government-owned company. This proposed building and other prestigious building projects throughout Dubai in late 2008 were never built, largely as a result of the global credit crunch.

The project was officially cancelled by Nakheel in February 2011, and Nakheel opened Al Ittihad Park on the site in November 2012. Plans were renewed in 2025.

== History ==
The Trump International Hotel & Tower was to be the first development from the Trump Organization in the Middle East, but the project ultimately failed. During the planning phase, Donald Trump stated "When I look at potential sites for real estate investment, I concentrate on 'location, location, location' – and this is the best location not only in Dubai but the whole of the Middle East." Christina Aguilera was booked to entertain guests at Trump's Los Angeles estate for the launch party on 23 August 2008.

The joint venture of Al Habtoor Engineering and Murray & Roberts was selected as the preferred construction bidder in late 2007, and the estimated completion date was set to 2009 at a cost of US$600,000,000 (equivalent to $931,630,000 in 2025). Foundation work started in August 2007. By 2008, the estimated cost had increased to US$789,000,000 (equivalent to $1,179,840,000 in 2025). In late November 2008, the Trump International Hotel & Tower was one of three "landmark projects" to be delayed by Nakheel due to the 2008 financial crisis.

During construction, one bidder offered US$3,022 (equivalent to $4,325 in 2025) per square foot for one of the two planned penthouses. By February 2011, the status of the project was unclear. After the project was cancelled, Trump stated "[he and Nakheel] were smart and we got a little bit lucky that we never started that job" in a 2014 interview.

In April 2025, Eric Trump announced renewed plans for the hotel. It will feature the world's highest pool, $20 million penthouses, and each apartment comes with a "gold card" visa. Once completed in December 2031, it will stand at 350 m (1,150 ft) with 80 floors at a cost of $1 billion. It is the first property developed by the Trump Organization in the Middle East. It was also announced that Bitcoin would be an acceptable form of payment for residential units.

== Design ==
Orlando-based HHCP Design International, Inc. (Managing Partner, Gregory Dungan, AIA) created the master plan for the Palm Jumeriah and the original design for the Trump International Hotel & Tower. The first design was nicknamed the "Golden Tulip" and featured a circular tower surrounded by four large golden petals attached to the sides. The Golden Tulip design won an award from the American Resort Development Association in 2006. Trump stated that he "wasn't a huge fan of [the Tulip design]".

HHCP’s design for the tower, due to begin construction at end of next year, merges traditional Arab/Islamic design philosophies with an innovative sense of modernity. The result is an exciting and inspiring architectural icon that stands in tribute to the forward-looking spirit of the “new” Dubai—in short, an ideal property for the famous Trump style of branding.

— HHCP 2006 Annual Profile

Atkins Global was asked to evaluate the HHCP design in February 2006, and responded by revealing an updated concept design in November 2006. The senior design architect was Lee Morris. In Morris's design, two asymmetrical towers, linked at the 40th storey, form an archway over the Palm Jumeirah Monorail. The 62 storey-high towers feature stainless steel, glass, and stone facades, and a monorail station is located at the base of the two towers. The towers were planned to include a 378-room hotel (in the shorter tower) and a 397-apartment residential component (including two penthouse apartments, in the taller tower).

== See also ==
- List of buildings in Dubai
- Trump International Hotel and Tower
