= Hotel Vier Jahreszeiten =

Hotel Vier Jahreszeiten may refer to the following hotels in Germany:

- Hotel Vier Jahreszeiten (Hamburg)
- Hotel Vier Jahreszeiten (Munich)
