= Kempinski =

Luxury hotel chain

Kempinski Hotels S.A.
- Type: Private
- Industry: Hospitality, tourism
- Founded: 1862 (164 years ago) in Germany
- Founder: Berthold Kempinski
- Headquarters: Geneva, Switzerland; Kempinski AG Munich, Germany
- Area served: Worldwide, except North America, South America and Oceania
- Key people: Barbara Muckermann, Current CEO
- Products: Hotels, restaurants, residences
- Number of employees: 24,000
- Website: www.kempinski.com

Kempinski Hotels S.A., commonly known as Kempinski, is a German luxury hotel management company headquartered in Geneva, Switzerland. The company now claims a founding date of 1862, which might make Kempinski the oldest hospitality company in the world, however the brand only opened its first hotel at Berlin in 1897, as the Hotelbetriebs-Aktiengesellschaft The group currently operates 75 five-star hotels and residences in 38 countries.

== History ==
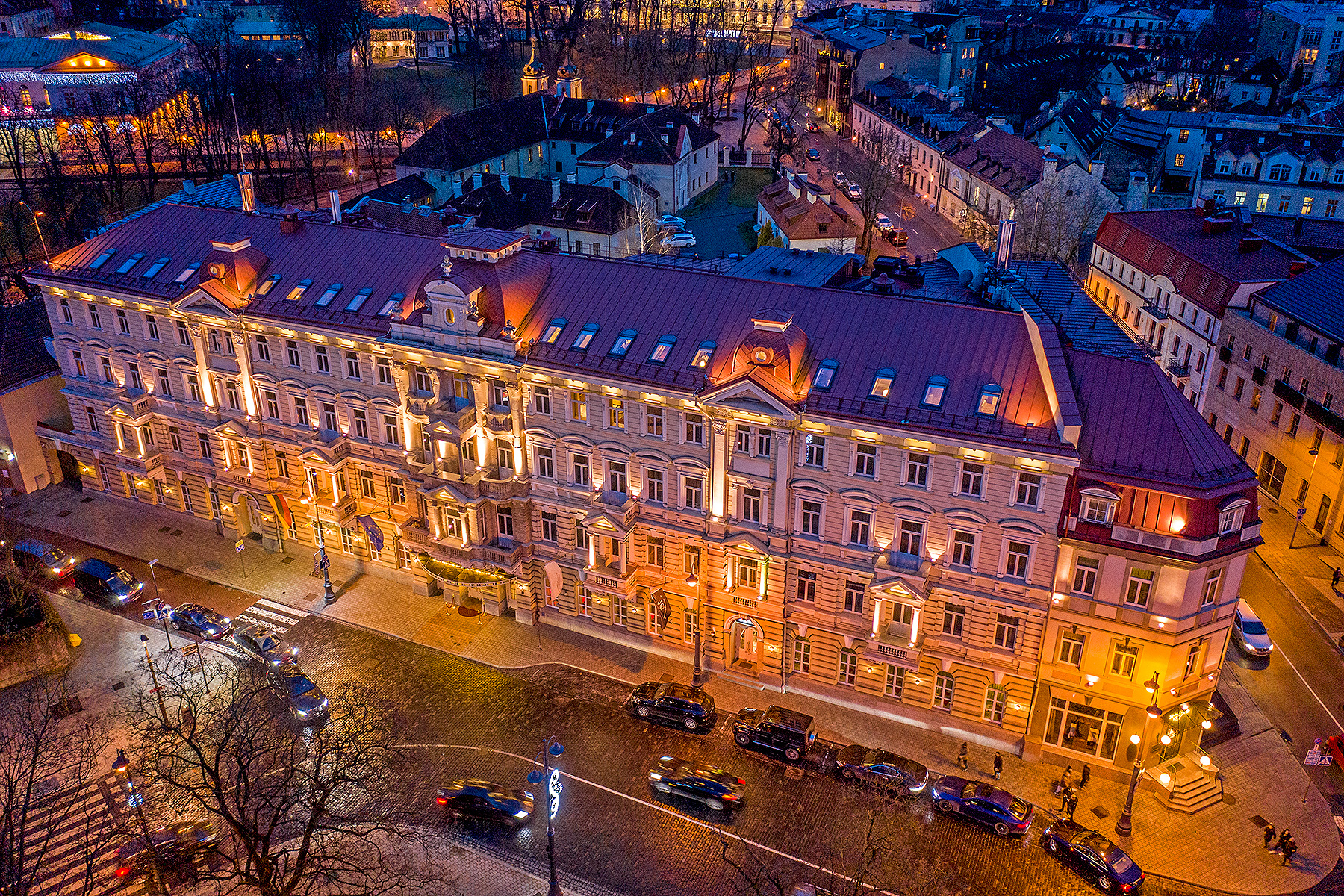
Grand Hotel Kempinski in Vilnius

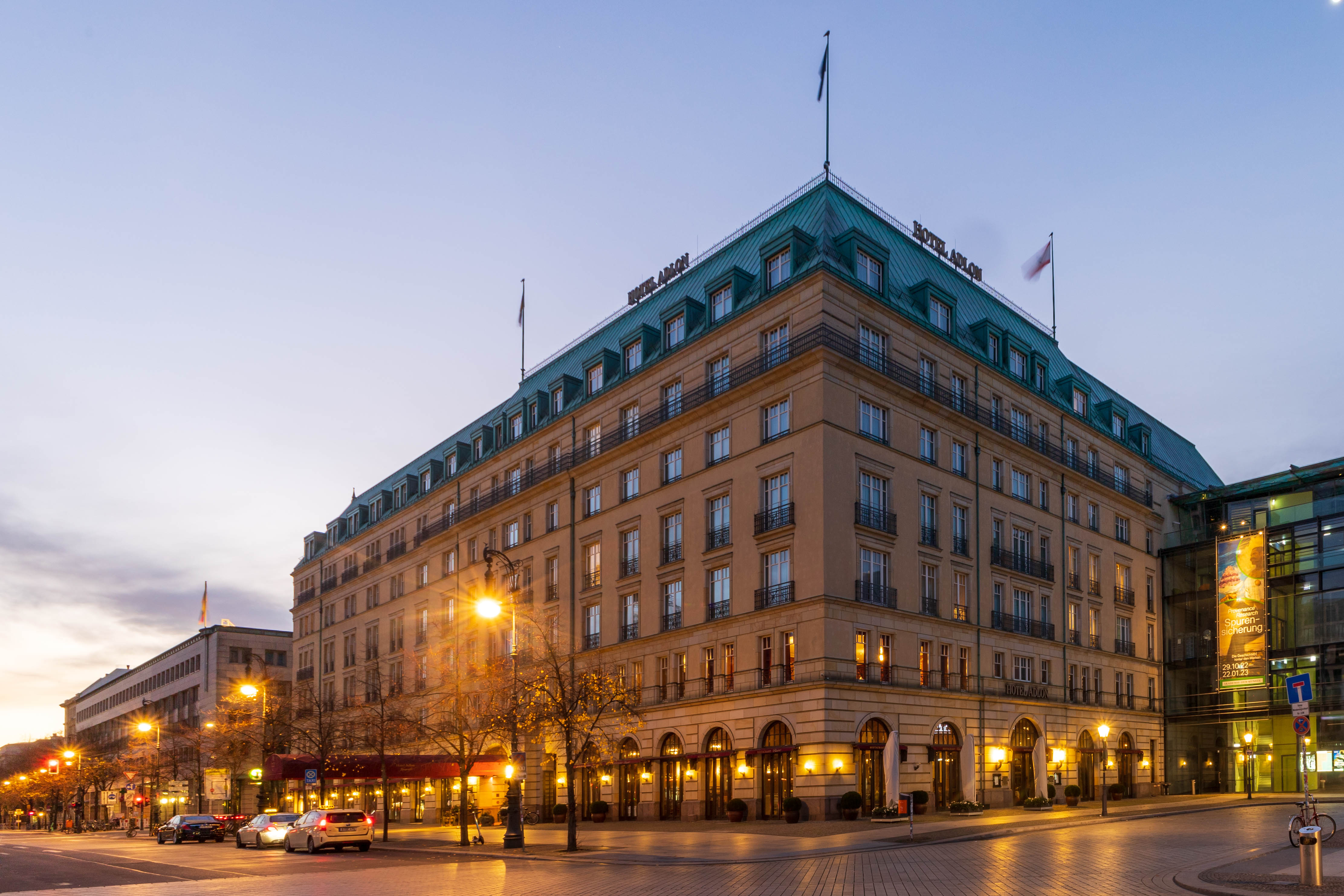
Hotel Adlon in Berlin

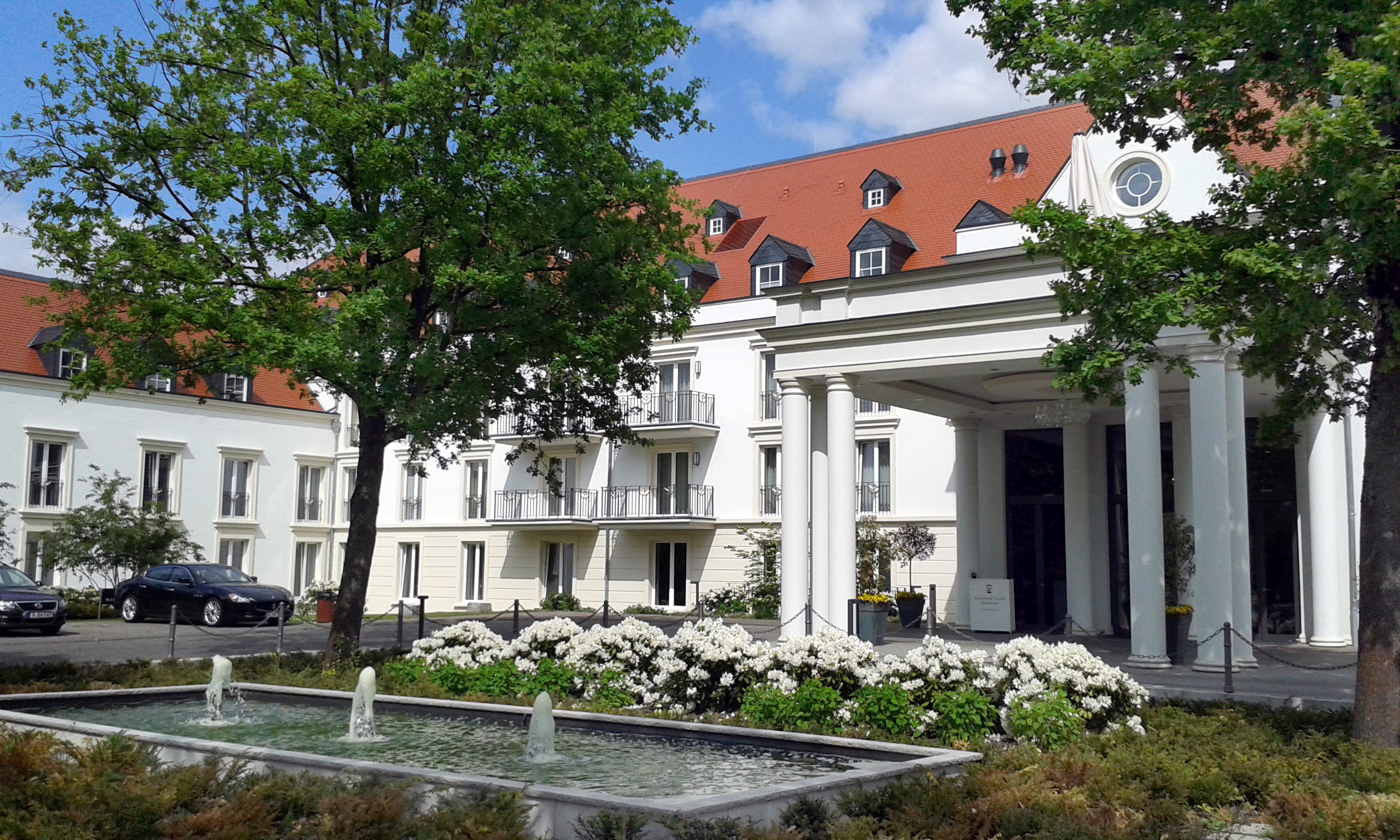
Kempinski Hotel in Frankfurt

Kempinski now claims to be the oldest hospitality company in the world and the first hotel brand ever. However, there is no external validation to its, very recent, claim of being the world's oldest hotel company. Also, Kempinski Hotels claims to be Europe's oldest luxury hotel group. Its history began in 1897 with the foundation of the "Hotelbetriebs-Aktiengesellschaft" in Berlin. A parallel development was that of M. Kempinski & Co, founded by Berthold Kempinski, which was acquired by the "Hotelbetriebs-Aktiengesellschaft" in 1953.

Berthold Kempinski was born on 10 October 1843 in Posen (then a German province, and now Poland). The Kempinski family was already successfully active in the wine trade from 1862. In 1872 it extended its company to Berlin, where Berthold Kempinski opened a wine merchant's business under his name in the Friedrichstraße. In 1889 he opened a restaurant, the biggest in Berlin, in the Leipziger Straße.

Since Berthold Kempinski and his wife Helena had no son, they invited their son-in-law Richard Unger (1866–1947) to join the business. Berthold Kempinski finally transferred the firm to his son-in-law on condition that he kept the name Kempinski. Berthold Kempinski died on March 14, 1910.

Alongside his wine and restaurant activities, Richard Unger developed his property business up to the start of World War I. After a short period of stagnation during the War, he sold products of his own manufacture under the brand name Kempinski. The business in Berlin flourished so that in 1918, a Kempinski hotel dependency was established at 27 Kurfürstendamm, where the Kempinski Hotel Bristol now stands. Ten years later, M. Kempinski & Co. took over the "Haus Vaterland" on the Potsdamer Platz, where the firm exploited a concept that was unique in Berlin for a long time and is still known as "event gastronomy" ("Erlebnisgastronomie").

To escape the events of World War II, Richard Unger and his family emigrated to the United States and the firm M. Kempinski & Co (Mister Kempinski & Co) became part of Aschinger AG.

The Restaurant at 27 Kurfürstendamm was destroyed by fire shortly before the end of the War, and the other properties fell victim to bombing raids. After the end of the conflict, Richard Unger's son and Berthold Kempinski's grandson, Friedrich Unger, returned to Germany. In 1951 construction started on a hotel on the site of the ruined restaurant at 27 Kurfürstendamm, and it opened a year later under the name Hotel Kempinski. For 20 years the modern, progressive five-star hotel enjoyed the undisputed status of the sole luxury hotel in Berlin.

In 1953 Friedrich Unger sold his shares and the name Kempinski to the "Hotelbetriebs-Aktiengesellschaft", which already ran hotels such as the Baltic, the Bristol and the Kaiserhof. The name Bristol was adopted and is still used at the Kempinski Hotel at 27 Kurfürstendamm. In subsequent years, the "Hotelbetriebs-Aktiengesellschaft" took over the management of several famous hotels. In 1957 it acquired the luxurious Hotel Atlantic in Hamburg.

In 1970 the General Assembly of the "Hotelbetriebs-Aktiengesellschaft" voted to change its name to "Kempinski Hotelbetriebs-Aktiengesellschaft". In the same year, a long-lasting partnership was established with Lufthansa in the form of a 50-per cent participation in the Hotel Vier Jahreszeiten in Munich, in which Lufthansa already had a holding. In 1977 the hotel company received its present name as "Kempinski Aktiengesellschaft (AG)". At the same time, the Kempinski Hotel Frankfurt Gravenbruch was added to the group's portfolio as its fourth German hotel.

In 1985, Lufthansa acquired shares in Kempinski AG and thereby enabled the hotel company to operate Kempinski hotels abroad too. A year later, Kempinski AG, Lufthansa and the finance company Rolaco S.A. founded Kempinski Hotels S.A., with its head office in Geneva. In 1993 Kempinski AG acquired all the shares in Kempinski S.A.

The Bangkok-based Dusit Sindhorn Company Ltd took over Kempinski in November 1994, when it acquired a 52% stake. The 50:50 joint venture between Dusit Thani Group, and the Siam Commercial Bank eventually accumulated an 83% stake in the group, and Dusit Thani exited from the joint venture in 1998 when it sold out to its partner.

In February 2017, the two existing shareholders of Kempinski AG formalized previous plans for an equity transfer between them. The majority shares of Kempinski AG are held by the existing Bahraini shareholder, Khalifa bin Salman Al Khalifa while the shareholder from Thailand holds a minority. In the same month, Kempinski announced the opening of its first luxury hotel in Cuba.

In 2024, Kempinski acquired two hotels previously managed by Emaar, formerly known as Address Boulevard and Address Dubai Mall. These hotels are now known as Kempinski The Boulevard and Kempinski Central Avenue Dubai, doubling Kempinski's presence in Dubai to four.

== Kempinski Hotels worldwide ==
Kempinski Hotels' portfolio currently comprises 79 hotels and residences worldwide. With the exception of the Hotel Vier Jahreszeiten Kempinski in Munich, which belongs to the group, and two hotels with leasing contracts, Kempinski Hotels operates its luxury hotels and residences under management contracts.

Europe

Europe
No.	Name	Location	Country	Opening Year
1	Barbaros Reserve Bodrum Residences, Managed by Kempinski	Bodrum	Turkey	2023
2	Çırağan Palace Kempinski Istanbul	Istanbul	Turkey	1991
3	Frutt Mountain Resort, Managed by Kempinski	Kerns	Switzerland	2020
4	Grand Hotel des Bains Kempinski St. Moritz	St. Moritz	Switzerland	2002
5	Grand Hotel Kempinski High Tatras	Štrbské Pleso	Slovakia	2009
6	Grand Hotel Kempinski Riga	Riga	Latvia	2017
7	Grand Hotel Kempinski Vilnius	Vilnius	Lithuania	2012
8	Hotel Adlon Kempinski Berlin	Berlin	Germany	1997
9	Hotel Baltschug Kempinski Moscow	Moscow	Russia	1992
10	Hotel Bristol Berlin	Berlin	Germany	1952
11	Hotel Taschenbergpalais Kempinski Dresden	Dresden	Germany	1995
12	Hotel Vier Jahreszeiten Kempinski Munich	Munich	Germany	1970
13	Kempinski Hotel Adriatic Istria Croatia	Savudrija	Croatia	2009
14	Kempinski Hotel Bahía Marbella	Estepona	Spain	1999
15	Kempinski Hotel Barbaros Bay Bodrum	Bodrum	Turkey	2005
16	Kempinski Hotel Berchtesgaden	Berchtesgaden	Germany	2005
17	Kempinski Hotel Corvinus Budapest	Budapest	Hungary	1992
18	Kempinski Hotel Das Tirol Kitzbühel Alps	Jochberg	Austria	2011
19	Kempinski Hotel Frankfurt Gravenbruch	Frankfurt	Germany	1977
20	Kempinski Hotel Grand Arena Bansko	Bansko	Bulgaria	2005
21	Kempinski Hotel San Lawrenz Gozo Malta	Gozo	Malta	2001
22	Kempinski Hotel The Dome Belek	Belek	Turkey	2005
23	Kempinski Palace Engelberg	Engelberg	Switzerland	2021
24	Kempinski Palace Portorož Slovenia	Portorož	Slovenia	2008
25	Palais Hansen Kempinski Vienna	Vienna	Austria	2013
26	San Clemente Palace Kempinski Venice	Venice	Italy	2016

Asia-Pacific

Asia-Pacific
No.	Name	Location	Country	Opening Year
1	Beijing Yanqi Island Pavilion	Beijing	China	2014
2	Grand Kempinski Hotel Shanghai	Shanghai	China	2013
3	Hotel Indonesia Kempinski Jakarta	Jakarta	Indonesia	2009
4	Kempinski Hotel Beijing Yansha Center	Beijing	China	1992
5	Kempinski Hotel Changsha	Changsha	China	2014
6	Kempinski Hotel Chengdu	Chengdu	China	2004
7	Kempinski Hotel Chongqing	Chongqing	China	2012
8	Kempinski Hotel Dalian	Dalian	China	2005
9	Kempinski Hotel Fuzhou	Fuzhou	China	2016
10	Kempinski Hotel Guiyang	Guiyang	China	2009
11	Kempinski Hotel Hangzhou	Hangzhou	China	2019
12	Kempinski Hotel Jinan	Jinan	China	2021
13	Kempinski Hotel Khan Palace Ulaanbaatar	Ulaanbaatar	Mongolia	2007
14	Kempinski Hotel Nanjing	Nanjing	China	2019
15	Kempinski Hotel Shenzhen	Shenzhen	China	2006
16	Kempinski Hotel Suzhou	Suzhou	China	2008
17	Kempinski Hotel Taiyuan	Taiyuan	China	2013
18	Kempinski Hotel Xiamen	Xiamen	China	2012
19	Kempinski Hotel Yinchuan	Yinchuan	China	2010
20	Kempinski Residences Guangzhou	Guangzhou	China	2020
21	Kempinski The One Suites Hotel Shanghai Downtown	Shanghai	China	2012
22	Siam Kempinski Hotel Bangkok	Bangkok	Thailand	2010
23	Sindhorn Kempinski Hotel Bangkok	Bangkok	Thailand	2020
24	Sunrise Kempinski Hotel Beijing	Beijing	China	2014
25	The Apurva Kempinski Bali	Nusa Dua	Indonesia	2019
26	The Capitol Kempinski Hotel Singapore	Singapore	Singapore	2018
27	Yanqi Hotel, Managed by Kempinski	Beijing	China	2014

Africa & Middle East

Middle East & Africa
No.	Name	Location	Country	Opening Year
1	Bristoria Hotel Erbil	Erbil	Iraq	2022
2	Djibouti Palace Kempinski	Djibouti City	Djibouti	2006
3	Kempinski Al Othman Hotel Al Khobar	Al Khobar	Saudi Arabia	2016
4	Kempinski Central Avenue Dubai	Dubai	United Arab Emirates	2024
5	Kempinski Hotel & Residences Palm Jumeirah	Palm Jumeirah	United Arab Emirates	2011
6	Kempinski Hotel Amman	Amman	Jordan	2005
7	Kempinski Hotel Aqaba Red Sea	Aqaba	Jordan	2009
8	Kempinski Hotel Gold Coast City Accra	Accra	Ghana	2015
9	Kempinski Hotel Ishtar Dead Sea	Sweimeh	Jordan	2006
10	Kempinski Hotel Mall of the Emirates	Dubai	United Arab Emirates	2006
11	Kempinski Hotel Muscat	Muscat	Oman	2018
12	Kempinski Hotel Soma Bay	Soma Bay	Egypt	2008
13	Kempinski Nile Hotel Cairo	Cairo	Egypt	2010
14	Kempinski Residences and Suites Doha	Doha	Qatar	2010
15	Kempinski Seychelles Resort	Mahé	Seychelles	2012
16	Kempinski Summerland Hotel & Resort Beirut	Beirut	Lebanon	2016
17	Kempinski The Boulevard Dubai	Dubai	United Arab Emirates	2024
18	Marsa Malaz Kempinski, The Pearl - Doha	The Pearl Island	Qatar	2015
19	Olare Mara Kempinski Masai Mara	Maasai Mara	Kenya	2013
20	Royal Maxim Palace Kempinski Cairo	New Cairo	Egypt	2015
21	The David Kempinski Tel Aviv	Tel Aviv	Israel	2022
22	Villa Rosa Kempinski Nairobi	Nairobi	Kenya	2013
23	Kempinski Hotel Brazzaville	Brazzaville	Republic of the Congo	2025

Americas

Americas
No.	Name	Location	Country	Opening Year
1	Cayo Guillermo Resort Kempinski Cuba	Cayo Guillermo	Cuba	2020
2	Gran Hotel Bristol La Habana	Havana	Cuba	2020
3	Gran Hotel Manzana Kempinski La Habana	Havana	Cuba	2017
4	Kempinski Hotel Cancún	Cancún	Mexico	2022

=== Former Properties ===
- Emirates Palace Kempinski Abu Dhabi until 30 December 2019.

== Global Hotel Alliance ==
Kempinski is a founding member of the Global Hotel Alliance (GHA) which was founded in Geneva in 2004. Members of GHA's DISCOVERY loyalty programme receive recognition and rewards across more than 570 hotels, resorts, palaces and spas in 35 brands of hotels across 85 countries.
