= Palm Jumeirah Mall =

Shopping mall, in Dubai UAE

- مول نخلة جميرا
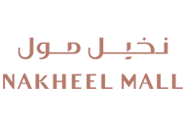
- Location: Palm Jumeirah, Dubai, United Arab Emirates
- Coordinates: 25.11427°N 55.13871°E
- Address: Center of Palm, Al Hilali
- Opened: 28 November 2019; 6 years ago
- Developer: Nakheel Properties
- Owner: Nakheel Properties
- Architect: RSP Architects Planners & Engineers
- Num. of stores: 350
- Floor area: 4.5 million ft^{2}
- Floors: 5
- Parking: Three-level multi-storey car park
- Public transit: Palm Monorail

Palm Jumeirah Mall (Arabic: مول نخلة جميرا), is a retail, dining and entertainment shopping mall that is located at the center of Palm Jumeirah in Dubai, United Arab Emirates.

The mall is interconnected to attractions such as The View at The Palm, The Rooftop and St. Regis Dubai. Nakheel Mall's Rooftop has dining and nightlife venues, including Tresind Studio and Soho Garden.

The mall is accessible via the Palm Jumeirah Monorail, with its own station. There is a three-level multi-storey car parking facility.

== History ==
Construction of the mall started in 2014. Nakheel Mall was officially inaugurated on November 28, 2019 at a cost of AED1.2 billion. It was designed by Singaporean architectural firm, RSP Architects Planners & Engineers.

The mall has five levels of shops, restaurants, and other attractions, including its luxury food hall Depachika, Fabyland indoor playground, Fitness First, an H&M store, Trampo Extreme trampoline park, a 15-screen VOX Cinemas complex, and a Waitrose supermarket. It includes 100,000 sqm of shop space, three basement parking levels with 4,000 spaces, 200 shops and two anchor department stores.

The mall also provides access to 240-meter-high observation deck sits at the top of The Palm Tower, providing vistas of the archipelago (The View at The Palm).

In 2021, St. Regis Dubai opened on Palm Jumeirah and occupies the first 18 floors of The Palm Tower, Nakheel’s landmark hotel.

In August 2022, Nakheel Mall launched Game Over Escape Rooms and Board Game Café, an immersive VR-powered escape room experience.
