= Friedrich Haerlin =

Friedrich Haerlin (born 24 February 1857 in Gaisburg; d. 28 April 1941 in Hamburg) was an hotelier, and founder of the Hotel Vier Jahreszeiten in Hamburg, Germany.

== Life and work ==
Friedrich Haerlin began work at an import company in Stuttgart, Germany following a business apprenticeship in 1875. In hopes to “get to know the world,” he moved to Geneva in 1876, where he found a job as a kitchen assistant in a station restaurant. After several months in this role, he was hired to be a waiter by Herrmann Blaile, owner of café-restaurant Chantepoulet. Haerlin found himself at this position only a short time before taking on more interesting opportunities at "Grand Hotel Thunerhof" in Thun, the "Grand Hotel d'Orient" in Menton, and the Baur au Lac in Zurich.

In 1891, Haerlin married Thekla Toussaint, who was from Bremen. On May 1, 1893, the couple began managing "Hotel Bellevue". In 1894, their first son Otto was born, followed by their son Wilhelm in 1895. Their first daughter Frieda was born in 1896, and son Fritz was born a year later in 1897. When Haerlin turned 40, he bought the bankrupt Hotel Vier Jahreszeiten, located on the Neuer Jungfernstieg in Hamburg for just 420,100 Reichsmark. The hotel was a small and inconspicuous building with just 11 rooms and 3 bathrooms. Over time, he acquired the neighboring houses nop. 9-14 until he had the acquired the entire street. By 1911, the hotel had a total of 140 bedrooms and 50 bathrooms.

In 1932, Haerlin gave the hotel to his son Fritz (1897-1975). The hotel remained family-owned until 1989, when it was sold for 210 million Deutsche Marks to hotelier Hiroyoshi Aoki. The furniture that Haerlin used during the century he owned the hotel was used up until 2001.

The Haerlin restaurant, named after Friedrich Haerlin, is known for its outstanding French cuisine. The restaurant has been awarded two Michelin Guide stars, and 17 Gault-Millau points.

== Literature ==
- Sepp Ebelseder, Michael Seufert: Vier Jahreszeiten, Europäische Verlagsanstalt, Hamburg, ISBN 978-3-43452597-4
