= Kempinski Residences Palm Jumeirah =

Kempinski Hotel & Residences Palm Jumeirah
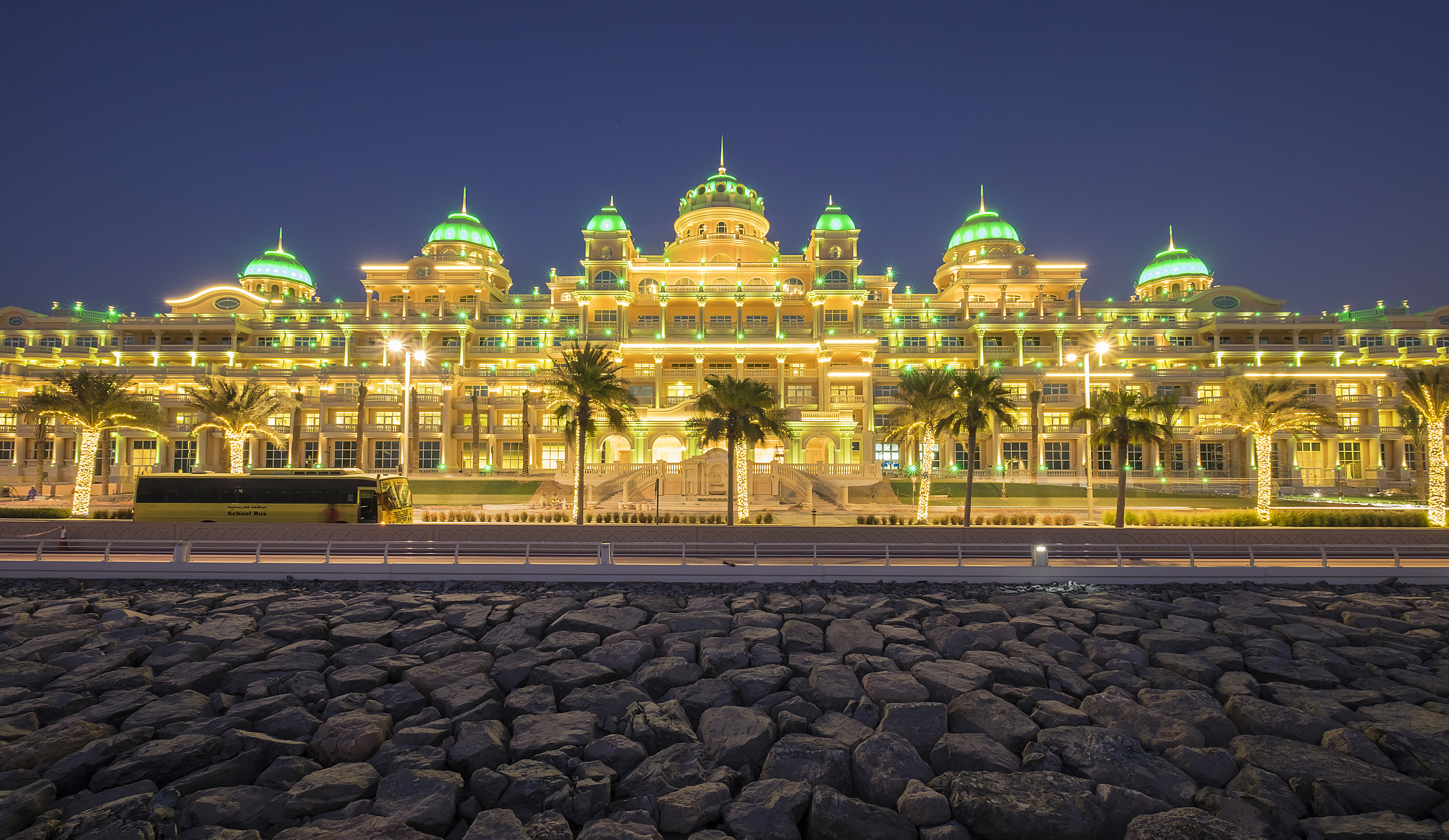

General information
- Location: Dubai, United Arab Emirates
- Opening: September 2011
- Management: Kempinski

Technical details
- Floor count: 7

Design and construction
- Architect: Atkins (company)
- Developer: EPG Hotels & Resorts

Other information
- Number of suites: 244
- Number of restaurants: 4
- Parking: Hotel valet parking and residents' private parking

Website
- www.kempinski.com/palmjumeirah

Kempinski Hotel & Residences Palm Jumeirah are the first residences to open on the crescent of Palm Jumeirah in Dubai. The project was due to open in 2009, however has been delayed due to the economic down turn. The property began construction in 2006.

The operating company of the residences is Kempinski Hotels of Germany. It will be the third property of Kempinski in the United Arab Emirates. However, it will be the first property on the beach in Dubai.

"The Residences have been one of the most successful projects in the UAE, with some of the highest prices achieved for property on Palm Jumeirah"

In March 2010, it was claimed that Luxury Palm homes project saw 'zero defaults' in their development, which was sold pre-crisis and continued development during the recession. More than 240 residential units were sold as part of the US$500 million (Dh1.83 billion) project at the peak of Dubai's property boom between 2007 and 2008, when a beach-front villa on Nakheel's Palm Jumeirah could fetch about Dh16m.

== See also ==
- List of development projects in Dubai
