= Hotel Vier Jahreszeiten (Munich) =

Luxury hotel in Munich, Germany

Hotel Vier Jahreszeiten Kempinski
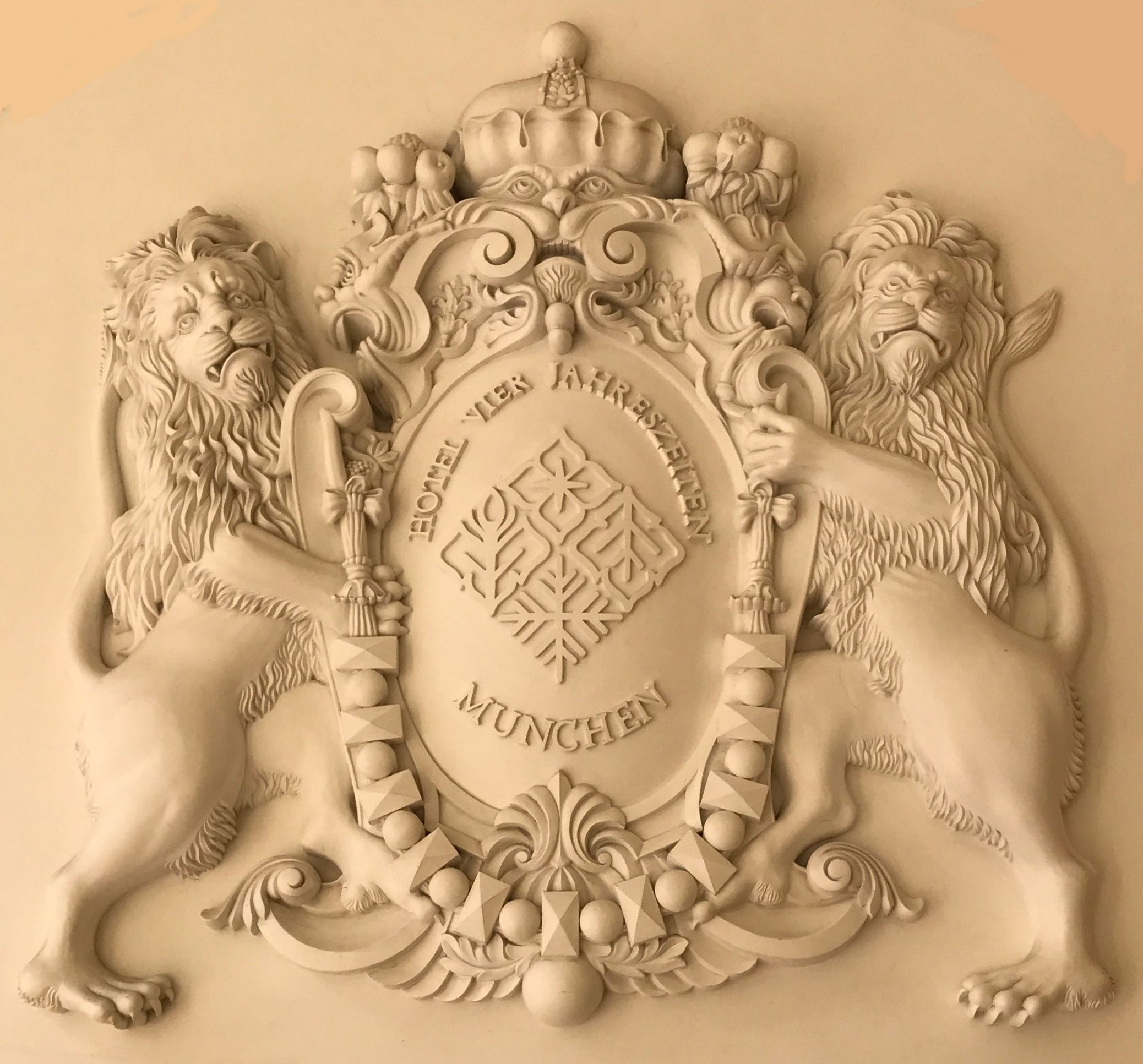

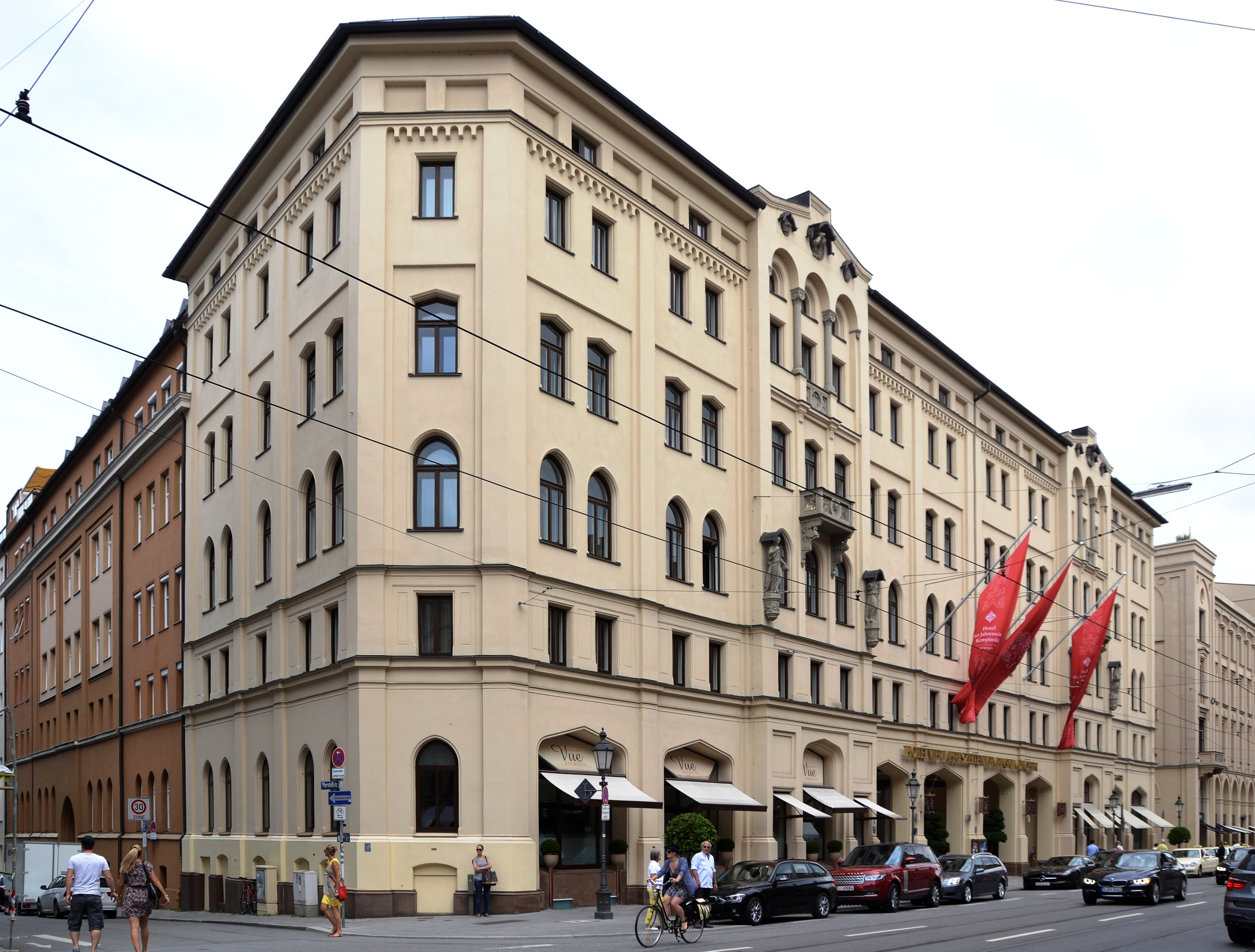
- View of the hotel in 2013
- Interactive map of the Hotel Vier Jahreszeiten Kempinski area

General information
- Type: Luxury hotel
- Classification: _{Superior}
- Location: Munich, Bavaria, Germany, Maximilianstraße 17
- Coordinates: 48°08′20″N 11°34′54″E
- Opened: 1858
- Operator: Kempinski

Website
- Official website

Hotel Vier Jahreszeiten Kempinski München (lit. 'Hotel Four Seasons Kempinski Munich') is a five-star luxury hotel located at Maximilianstraße 17 in the Altstadt district of Munich in Bavaria, Germany. It was opened in 1858 and is part of the Kempinski hotel chain. In 1925, the hotel hosted the first Chrysanthemum Ball, an annual charity event.

== Notable guests ==
=== Royalty ===
- Archduke Franz Ferdinand of Austria
- Empress Elisabeth of Austria
- Queen Elizabeth II
- Edward VIII (in October 1937, during his visit to Germany)

=== Others ===
- Konrad Adenauer
- Winston Churchill
- Sean "Diddy" Combs
- Plácido Domingo
- Otto Hahn
- Reinhard Heydrich
- Elton John
- Bob Fosse (in 1970, while researching his 1972 film Cabaret)
- Sophia Loren
- Vladimir Putin
- Romy Schneider
- Elizabeth Taylor
- The Rolling Stones
- Sir Peter Ustinov
- Rudolf von Sebottendorf
- Robbie Williams
- Harry Kane

== See also ==
- Hotel Vier Jahreszeiten (Hamburg)
