= Dar Al Arkan Real Estate Development Company =

Saudi Arabian property development company

Dar Al Arkan Real Estate Development Company شركة دار الأركان للتطوير العقاري
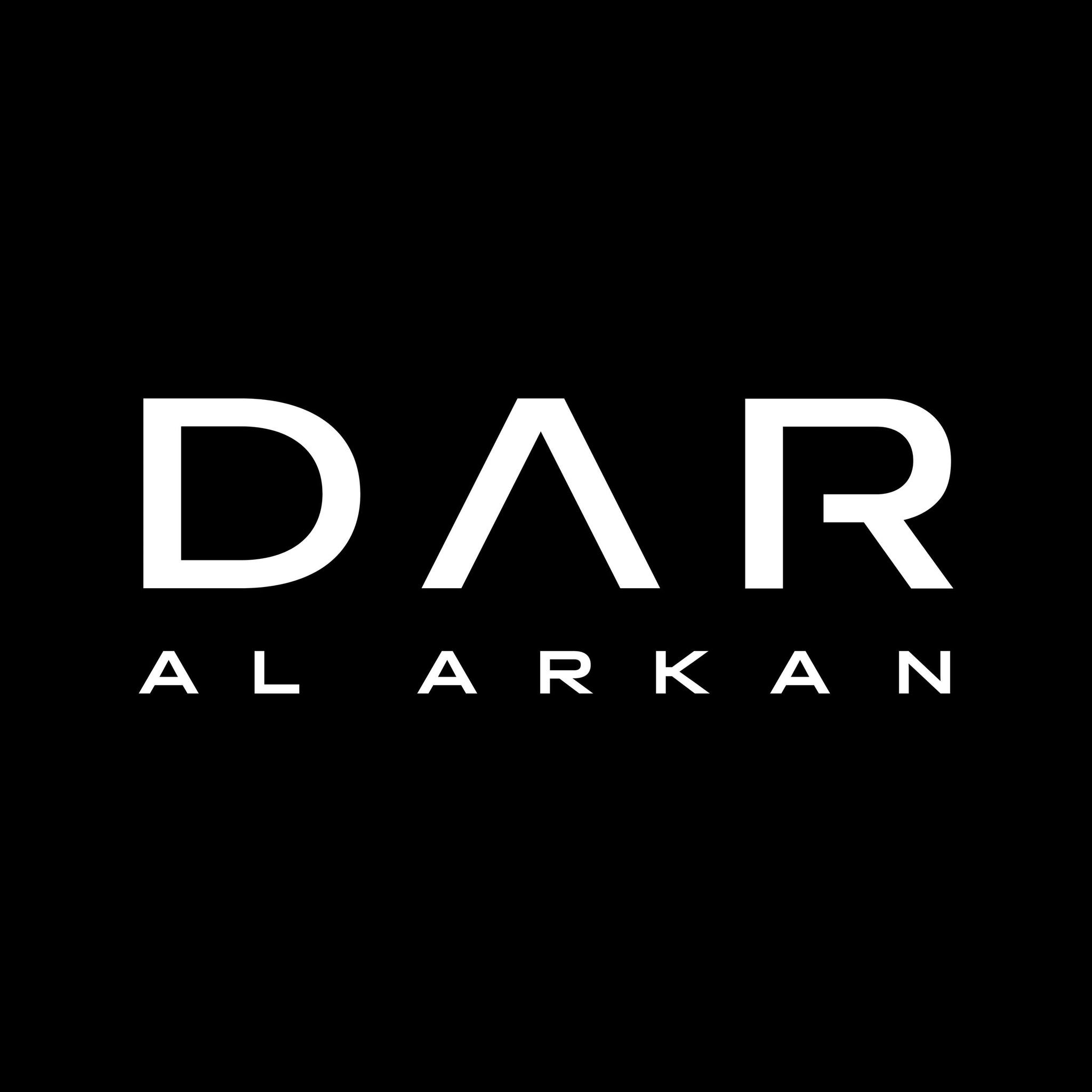
- Type: Public joint-stock company
- Traded as: 4300
- ISIN: SA11U0S23612
- Industry: Property development
- Founded: 1994; 32 years ago
- Headquarters: Riyadh, Saudi Arabia
- Key people: Yousef Al Shelash (Arabic: يوسف بن عبدالله الشلاش) (Founder, Chairman); Anand Raheja (CEO Dar Al Arkan Saudi Arabia); Ziad El Chaar (CEO Dar Al Arkan Global)
- Revenue: SAR $2.49 billion (2021)
- Net income: SAR $132.520 million (2021)
- Total assets: SAR $32 billion (2021)
- Total equity: SAR $19.159 (2021)
- Website: Dar Al Arkan

Dar Al Arkan Real Estate (DAAR) (Arabic: دار الأركان) is a Saudi Arabian property development company. It is the largest developer by market value in Saudi Arabia. Based in Riyadh, it was established in 1994. The company has close ties to the Saudi government.

Dar Al Arkan converted to a joint-stock company in 2005. In December 2007, the company listed its shares on the Saudi Stock Exchange (Tadawul All Share Index/ Real estate sector) under the symbol 4300. DarGlobal, the company's subsidiary, which was established to develop the company's international assets, is listed on the London Stock Exchange.

== Projects ==
=== Al Munisiya ===
The project is located on the north east of Riyadh, near Dammam highway. It occupies an area of approximately 285,822 square meters. Its residential section comprises 259 housing units.

=== Al Abrar Towers ===
The project is located in Makkah Al-Mukarama, near the Holy Haram, and the stoning area, 3 kilometers from the Haram. It consists of 400 residential units, comprising eight towers. The total area of the project is 58.213 sq meters. The project's construction was started in 2003 and completed in 2006. The total value of the project is SAR 97,890,000.

=== Al Qasr Mall ===
It is located in Riyadh, Saudi Arabia on an area of 250,000 square meters. Inaugurated in 2013, Al Qasr shopping mall consists of 4 floors and 350 stores. It also includes a food court, a fun zone and large open areas. The mall also contains 4 panoramic elevators, 28 escalators, 8 electric paths and 14 elevators connecting all levels and sections of the mall.

=== Urban Oasis, Interiors by Missoni ===
Urban Oasis by Missoni is Dar Al Arkan's first project outside of Saudi Arabia. The building is located in Dubai near the Dubai Water Canal. Once completed, it will offer residential apartments with interiors designed by Missoni. It features one to four bedroom apartments and 38 floors. In addition to the apartments, the tower will offer exclusive common area fully decorated by Missoni. The total value of the project is US$2.18 million.

=== Shams Ar Riyadh ===
The project is located north-west of Riyadh, Saudi Arabia on an area of 5 million square meters, of which 1.2 million square meters are built-up. The project is still under construction. The community contains common areas including restaurants, mosques, commercial retails, schools, malls and health care. It is designed to be a “city within a city”. Dar Al Arkan has already started selling project units.

=== Mirabilia ===
The project is located in Riyadh, Saudi Arabia, in Dar Al Arkan's 5 million square meter project, Shams Ar Riyadh. It is composed of upscale villas of 3 to 7 bedrooms designed by Roberto Cavalli. Villas are built on areas ranging from 300 to 1,600 square meters. The total value of the project was SAR 600 million.

=== Les Vagues residences by Elie Saab ===
Dar Al Arkan have launched the QR1bn seafront residential project in State of Qatar ‘Les Vagues residences by Elie Saab’ located at the Qetaifan Island North.

=== W Residences Dubai-Downtown ===
In February 2022, Dar Al Arkan announced the W Residences Dubai-Downtown, managed by Marriott International. The property is anticipated to be completed in 2025. It will consist of a tower with 384 exclusive residences and access to an infinity outdoor pool with views of Burj Khalifa, a terrace featuring outdoor dining and a lounge, and all of the W lifestyle amenities. The Residences are near the Dubai International Airport, the Dubai International Financial Centre, and The Dubai Mall.

In June 2022, Dar Al Arkan began construction for the $272.25 million W Residences Dubai-Downtown property. The already sold-out $1 billion AED development is expected to mark the first standalone residences under the W Hotels brand.

=== Trump Organization projects ===
In November 2022, Dar Al Arkan signed an agreement with The Trump Organization for its $4 billion project in Oman. Known as AIDA, the project is a joint venture with the Oman Tourism Development Company and will include Trump residential villas, a hotel, and a golf course built near Muscat.

In 2025, Dar Al Arkan's subsidiary Dar Global entered into an agreement with the Trump Organization to build a golf course in Qatar, a hotel and golf course project in Oman and luxury hotel in the Maldives.
