= Grand Hotel Kempinski High Tatras =

Hotel in Slovakia

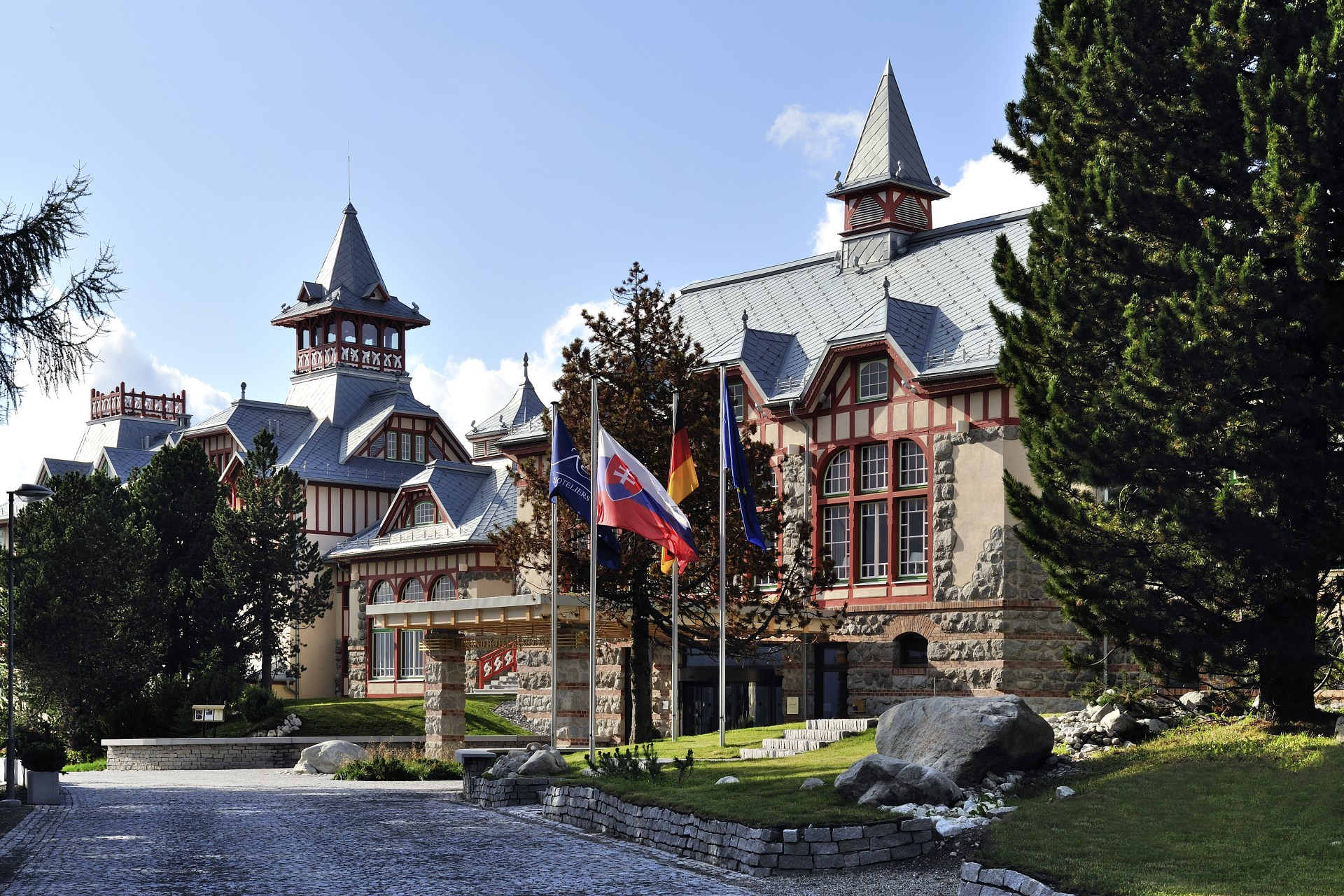
- Interactive map of the Grand Hotel Kempinski High Tatras area
- Hotel chain: Kempinski Hotels S.A.

General information
- Location: Kúpeľná 6,Štrbské Pleso, High Tatras, Slovakia
- Coordinates: 49°7′9.2706″N 20°3′31.9828″E
- Opening: May, 2009

Other information
- Number of rooms: 98
- Number of restaurants: 1
- Number of bars: 2

Website
- www.kempinski.com/hightatras

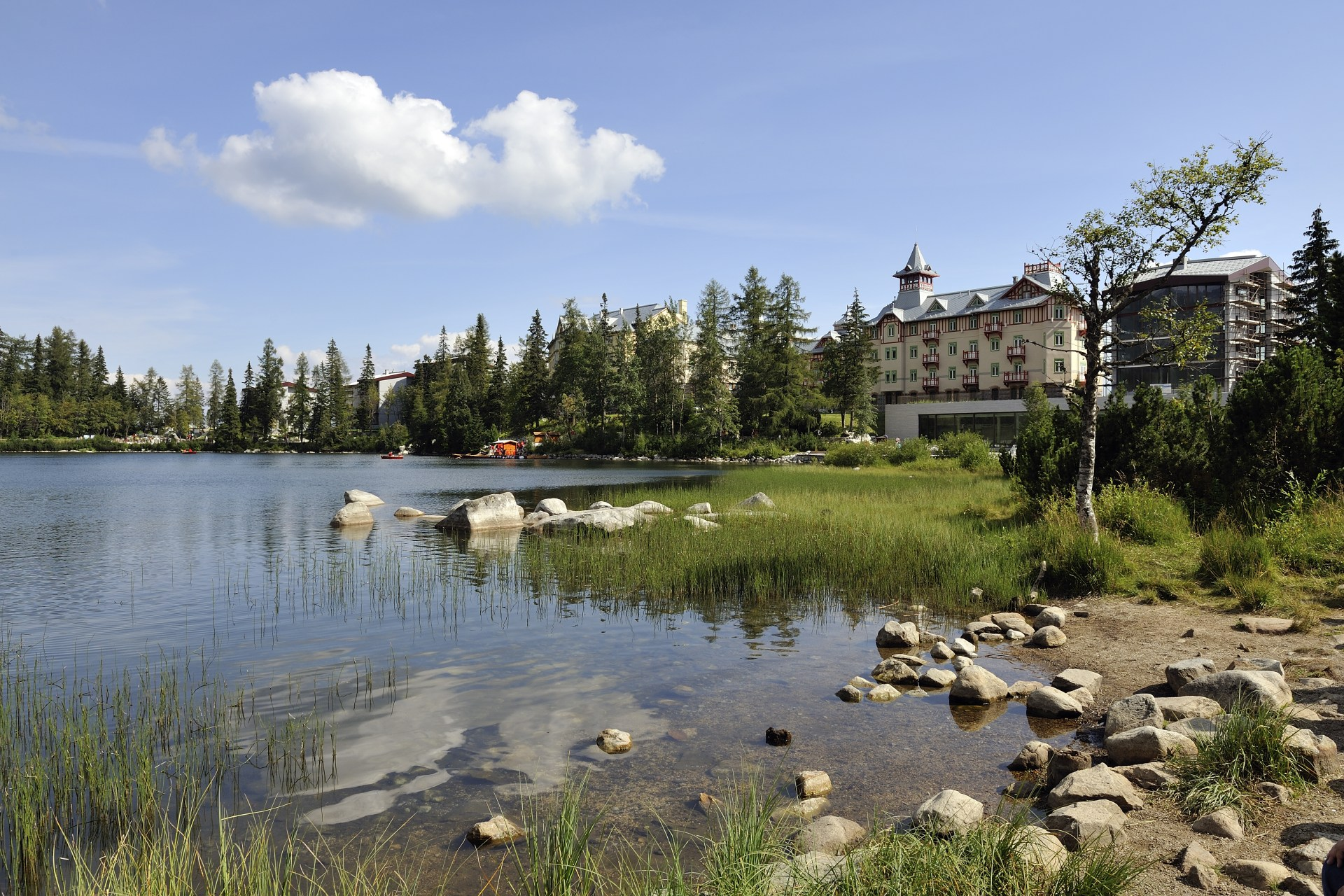
View of the hotel from Štrbské pleso

The Grand Hotel Kempinski High Tatras is a five-star hotel operated by Kempinski Hotels S.A. located on the shores of Štrbské pleso (Tschirmer See) in High Tatras, Slovakia.

After a EUR 42 million refurbishment of the former spa house complex Hviezdoslav, the hotel was inaugurated in May 2009.

== Location ==
The hotel is next to Štrbské Pleso, an alpine lake that is 1,351 meters (4432 ft) above sea level. The complex is located in the Tatra National Park. It is a Grade II listed building, making it a national monument.
