= Chrysanthemum Ball =

German debutante ball

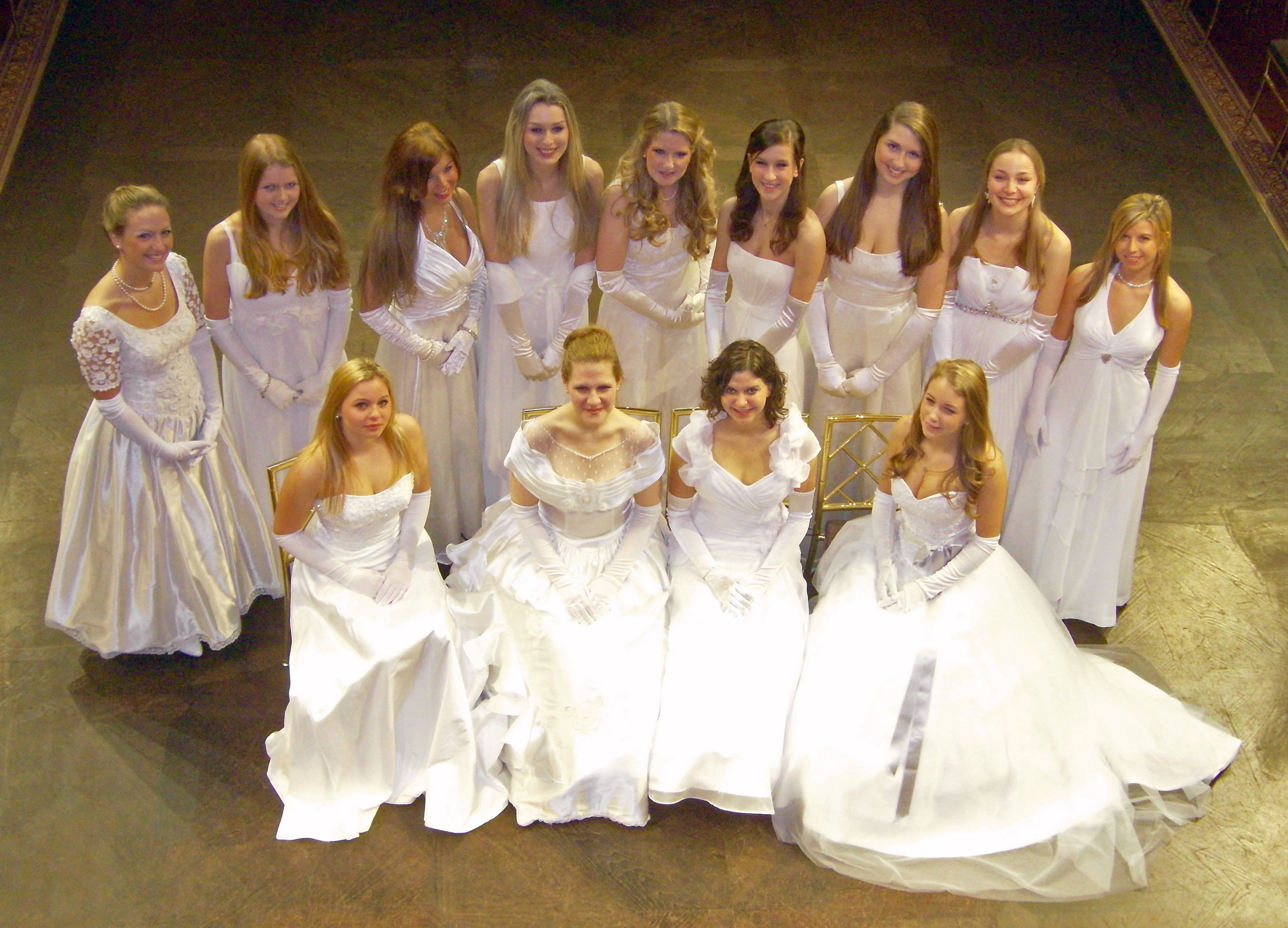
- Debutantes of the Chrysanthemum Ball in 2012
- Genre: debutante ball
- Frequency: annually
- Locations: Munich, Bavaria, Germany
- Inaugurated: 1925
- Founder: Paula Zell
- Patron: House of Wittelsbach

The Chrysanthemum Ball (German: Chrysanthemenball) is an annual charity event and debutante ball in Munich. It was founded in 1925.

== History ==
The Chrysanthemum Ball was established as a charity ball, to raise money for children in need, in 1925 by Paula Zell, the wife of Franz Zell. The first ball was hosted under the patronage of Antonia, Crown Princss of Bavaria, at the Cherubim Hall of the Hotel Vier Jahreszeiten on 3 February 1925. 25,000 Reichsmarks were donated to charity during the first ball.

The ball was later held at the Regina-Plast-Hotel, the Deutsches Theater, and the Hotel Bayerischer Hof. The debutante presentation was added to the ball in 1958.

Hugo Strasser performed annually at the ball for over sixty years, until his death in 2016.
