= Palm Monorail =

Monorail line in Dubai, United Arab Emirates

Palm Monorail Dubai
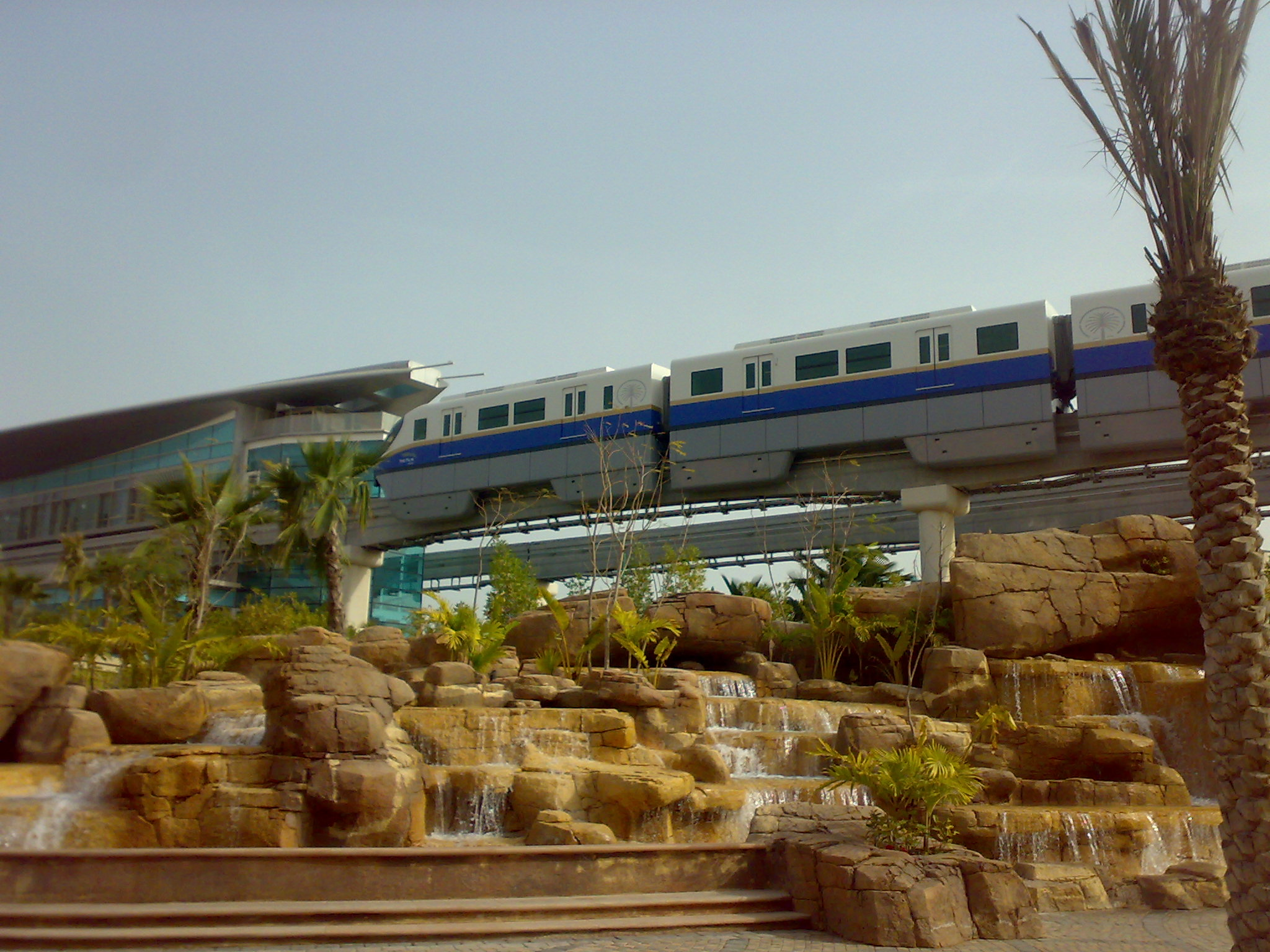
- The Monorail testing in February 2009

Overview
- Locale: Dubai
- Transit type: straddle-beam monorail
- Number of lines: 1
- Number of stations: 4 Stations
- Daily ridership: ~40,000 (capacity), under contemporary interval 23,000. Current ridership much lower.
- Website: www.palmmonorail.com

Operation
- Began operation: 30 April 2009
- Ended operation: 5 December 2025 (indefinite suspension)
- Operator: Serco
- Number of vehicles: 4 (2009) (only two visually seen in July 2014)

Technical
- System length: 5.45 kilometres (3 mi)
- Average speed: 35 km/h (22 mph)
- Top speed: 70 km/h (43 mph)

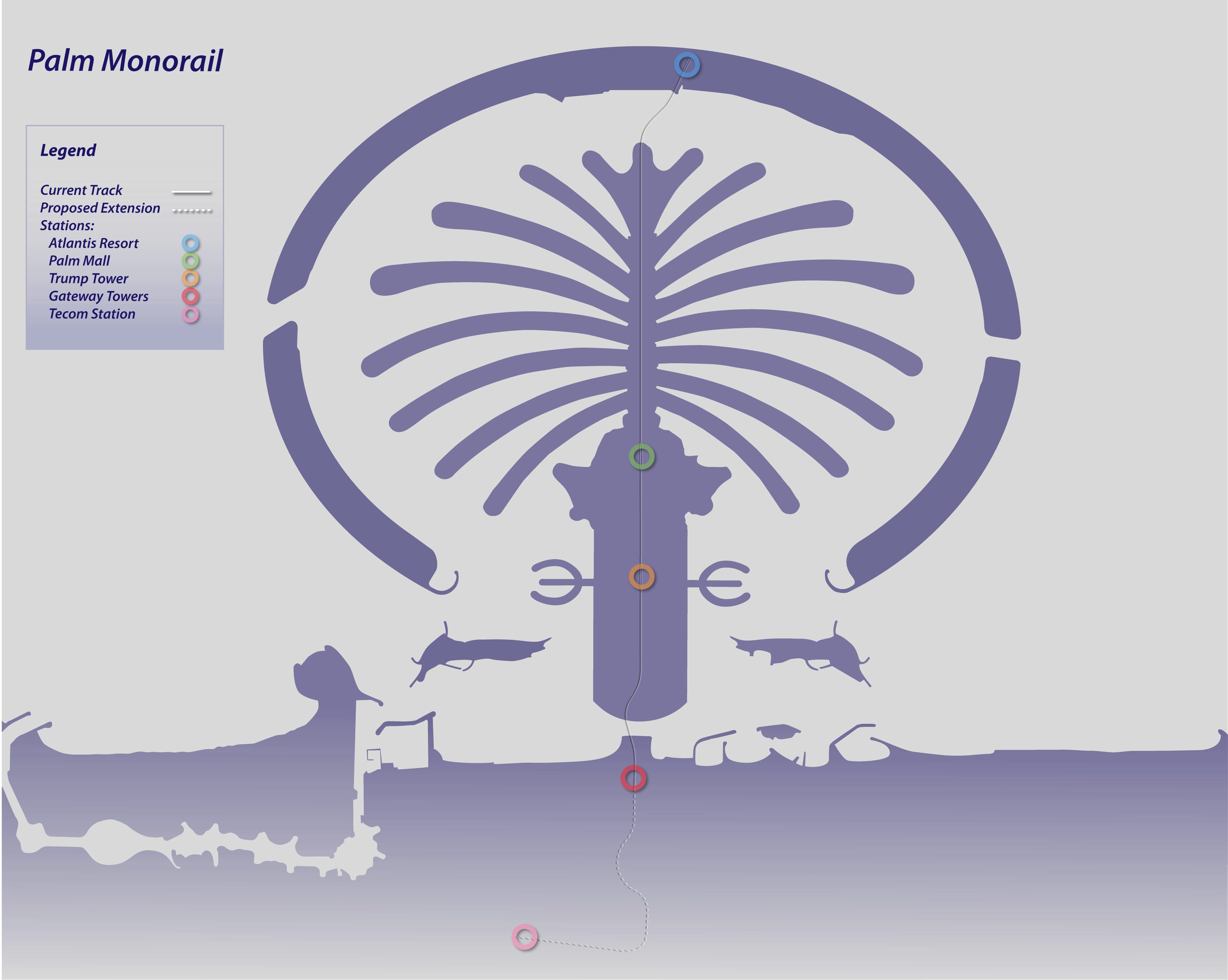
Plan Overview Of Palm Monorail Route

The Palm Monorail is a monorail line on the Palm Jumeirah island in Dubai, United Arab Emirates. It is operated by the UK-based Serco. The monorail connects the Palm Jumeirah to the mainland, with a planned further extension to the Red Line of the Dubai Metro. The line opened on 30 April 2009 as the Palm Jumeirah Monorail. It is the first monorail in the Middle East.

The trains are driverless, with attendants for any emergency situations. It currently runs from Gateway Station to Atlantis Aquaventure and stops at the Al Ittihad Park Station and Palm Jumeirah Mall Station.

In December 2025 the monorail line was suspended until further notice, with the operators citing essential station maintenance as the reason for closure. It resumed running in June 2026.

== History ==
Construction began on the 5.45-kilometre (3.39 mi) monorail line in March 2006, under the supervision of Marubeni Corporation, with the monorail track completed in July 2008 and vehicle testing beginning in November 2008. Originally planned to open by December 2008, the opening was delayed to 30 April 2009. In 2010, day-to-day operations were taken over by the British company Serco.

The project budget is US$400 million, with an additional US$190M set aside for a 2-kilometre (1.2 mi) future extension to the Dubai Metro, while other sources state a budget of US$1.1 billion. A journey on the monorail costs Dhs20 one-way, 30 return.

The Al Ittihad Park station, originally intended to serve the cancelled Trump International Hotel and Tower development, was opened on 3 July 2017. Nakheel Mall station opened on 28 November 2019.

== Technology ==
The Palm Monorail uses Hitachi Monorail straddle-type technology. The electro-mechanical works are carried out by ETA-Dubai in joint venture with Hitachi-Japan. Omron Electronics Company will provide the train equipment electronic system which will work by using the smart card technique.

== Ridership ==
Each carriage has 70 seats and can accommodate 232 standing passengers, for a total of 302 people.

The line has a theoretical capacity of 40,000 passengers per day, with trains running every few minutes during peak hours and every 15 to 20 minutes during off-peak hours. However, actual ridership averaged around 600 passengers per day during the first week, and the monorail ran "virtually empty". As of July 2017, the line runs every 11 minutes and averages 3,000 passengers per day.

== Stations ==
- Atlantis Aquaventure station — Atlantis, The Palm
- The Pointe station closed from July 2023 for a redevelopment project.
- Nakheel Mall station now changed the station name to Palm Jumeirah Mall
- Al Ittihad Park station — formerly Trump Plaza and Village Center Station
- Palm Gateway station — Gateway Towers, connection to Dubai Tram at Palm Jumeirah station (out-of-station interchange)

Palm Gateway station has more than 1,600 parking spaces available.

Planned extension

- Red Line — intended connection to Dubai Metro. Meanwhile Dubai Internet City is the nearest metro station on the Dubai Metro Red Line.

== Gallery ==
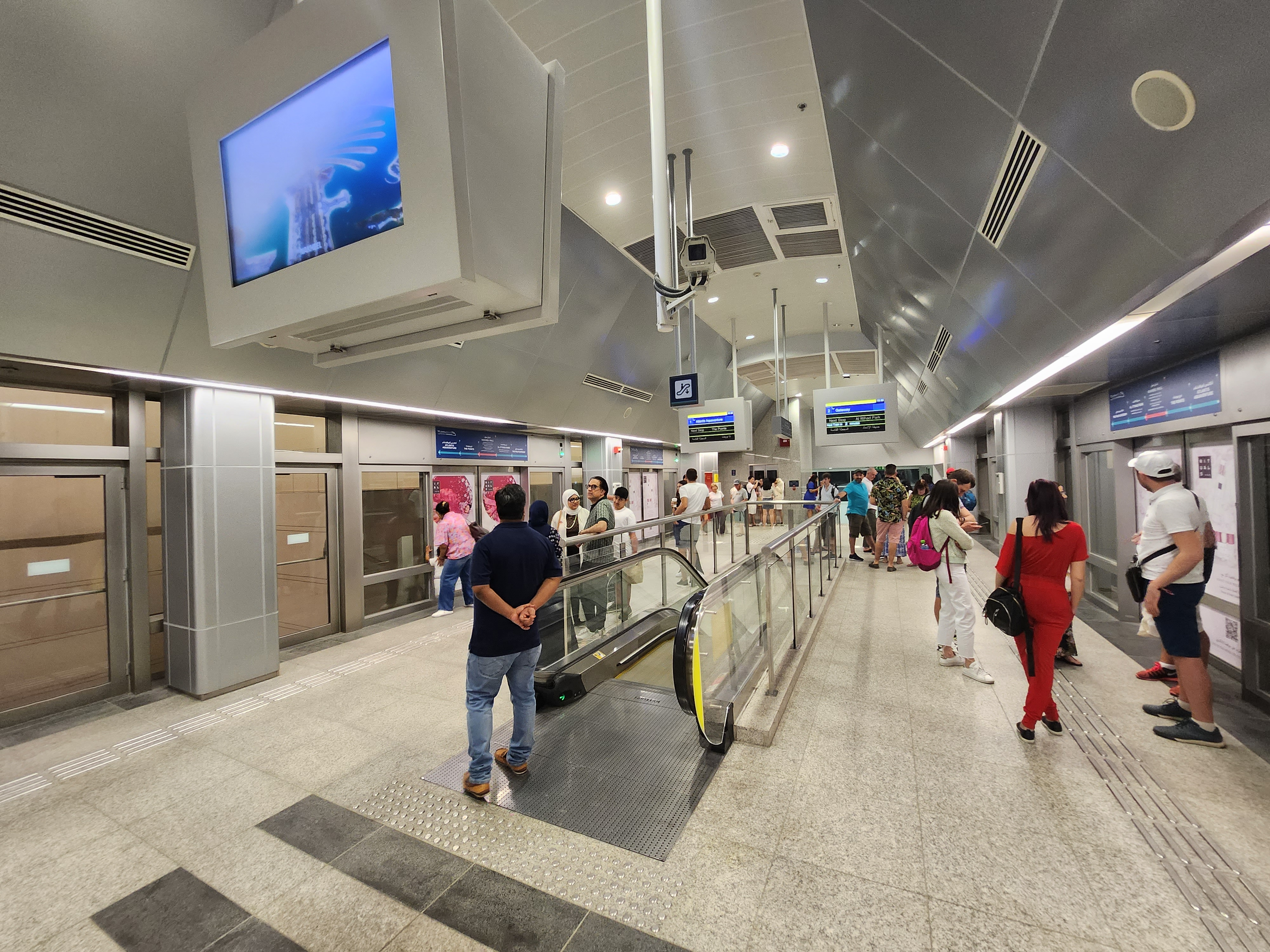
Monorail station in Nakheel mall

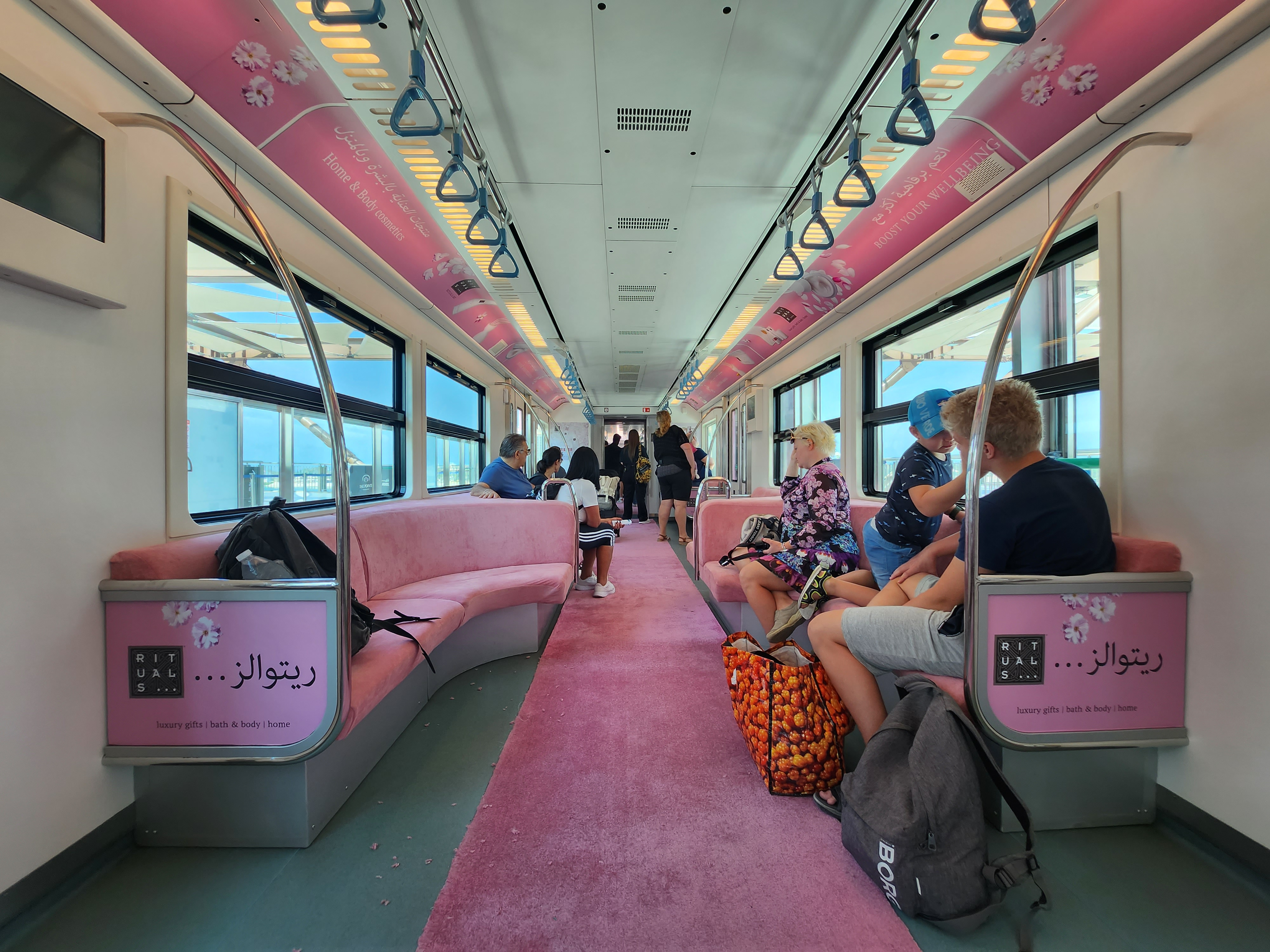
Inside the monorail train
