= Balvinder Singh Sahni =

Indian businessman (born 1972)

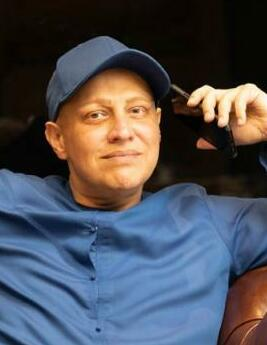
- Born: 7 April 1972 (age 54); Kuwait City, Kuwait
- Other name: Abu Sabah
- Citizenship: India
- Occupations: Businessman, real estate developer
- Known for: Founder of RSG Group
- Criminal charges: Money laundering, financial fraud
- Criminal penalty: 5 years imprisonment, fine, asset confiscation, deportation
- Criminal status: Imprisoned

Balvinder Singh Sahni (born 7 April 1972), also known as Abu Sabah, is an Indian businessman and real estate developer based in Dubai, United Arab Emirates. He is the founder and chairman of the RSG Group, a conglomerate involved in real estate, hospitality, and other sectors. In 2025, Sahni was convicted in Dubai on charges of money laundering and financial fraud.

== Early life and education ==
Sahni was born in Kuwait City, Kuwait, to parents of Punjabi heritage. His father, Amrik Singh, operated a business in the automotive sector. Sahni attended the New English School in Kuwait and left higher studies at age 18 to join the family business. He later established his own business ventures in the Gulf region.

== Business career ==
=== Establishment of RSG Group ===
In the early 2000s, Sahni moved to Dubai, where he established the Raj Sahni Group (RSG), a business involved in real estate, hospitality, and other sectors. The company's projects in Dubai have included developments such as Qasr Sabah and Burj Sabah.

=== Public profile ===
Sahni attracted public attention for high-profile purchases and a notable social media presence. In 2016, he purchased the "D5" vehicle license plate in Dubai for AED 33 million (approximately US$9 million). He maintained a significant following on social media and was frequently seen wearing blue clothing in public appearances.

== Legal issues ==
=== Investigation and charges ===
In late 2024, Sahni was arrested following an investigation by Dubai authorities into allegations of money laundering and financial fraud involving shell companies and forged documents. The case involved significant sums of money and numerous co-defendants.

=== Conviction and sentencing ===
In May 2025, the Dubai Fourth Criminal Court convicted Sahni of money laundering. He was sentenced to five years in prison and fined AED 500,000. The court also ordered the confiscation of AED 150 million linked to the illegal activities and his deportation following his prison term. Several others, including his eldest son, were also convicted and sentenced.

== Philanthropy ==
Prior to his legal troubles, Sahni contributed to charitable causes in India, including funding hospitals and old-age homes in Punjab.

== Personal life ==
Sahni was also known by the nickname "Abu Sabah". He lived in Palm Jumeirah, Dubai.
