= Palm Grandeur =

General information
- Location: Palm Jumeirah, Dubai, United Arab Emirates

Other information
- Number of rooms: 200 apartments and villas.

Palm Grandeur is a 5-star Resort, Spa, while The Grandeur Residences, is a AED 1.2 billion (USD 327 million) development project being built on the crescent of the Palm Jumeirah in Dubai, United Arab Emirates.

== See also ==
- List of development projects in Dubai
- Palm Jumeirah
