= Kempinski Hotel Beijing Lufthansa Center =

Building complex in Beijing, China

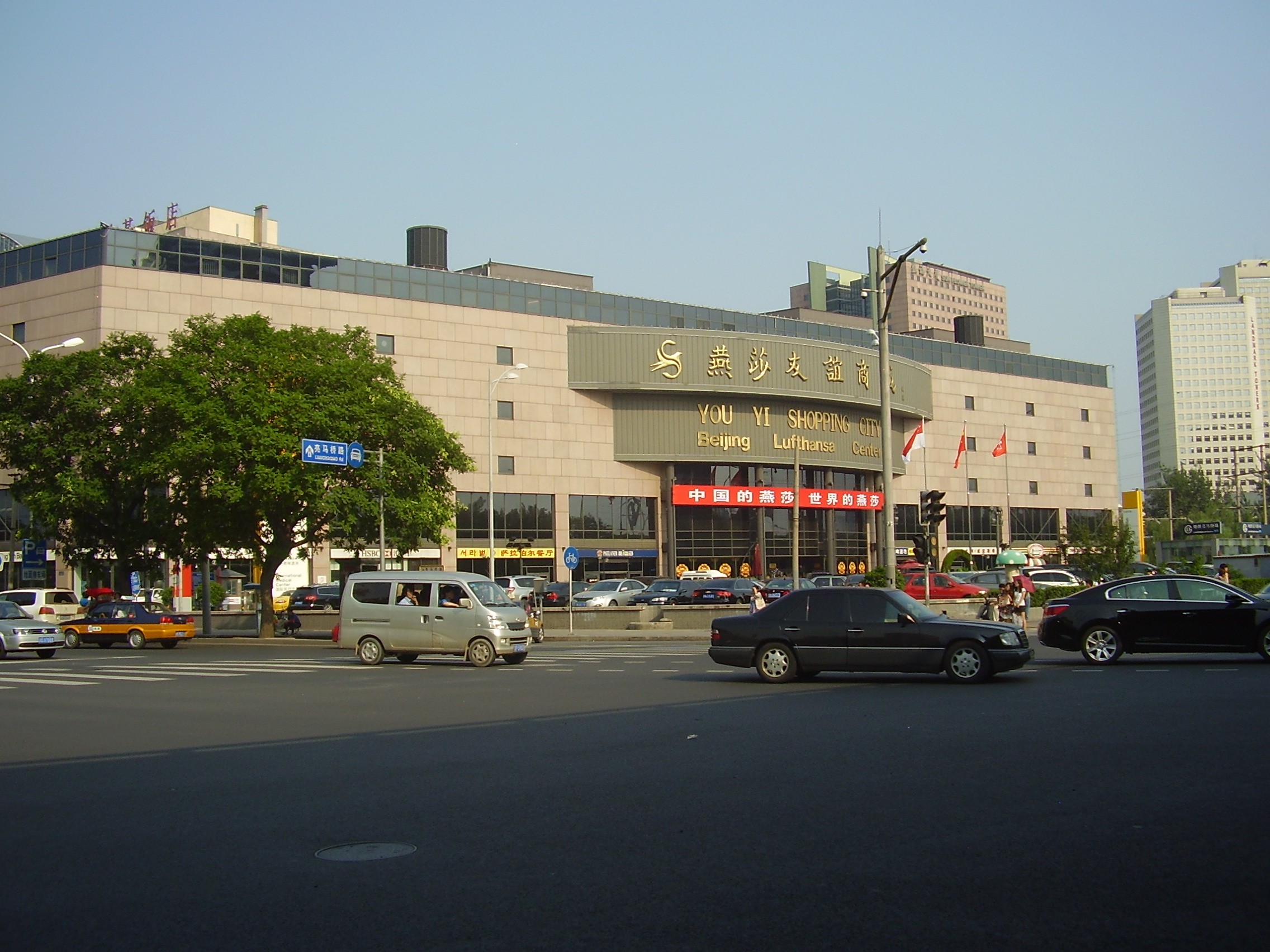
Kempinski Hotel Beijing Lufthansa Center

The Kempinski Hotel Beijing Lufthansa Center is a large building complex in Beijing that opened in 1992. It comprises three main parts: YouYi Shopping City (燕莎友谊商城), Kempinski Hotel Beijing (北京燕莎中心有限公司凯宾斯基饭店) and the Kempinski Serviced Apartments/ office complex.

The YouYi Shopping City primarily carries top western clothing brands. The Kempinski Hotel offers 526 rooms of different categories and was the German House during the 2008 Summer Olympics. In addition, the Lufthansa Center's seven restaurants (including the Beijing branch of the Paulaner Bräuhaus) are managed by Kempinski. The office complex hosts the Beijing offices of Lufthansa, Air Canada, Vermilion Partners Ltd and several other leading international firms.

== Kempinski Hotel Beijing ==
The Kempinski Hotel Beijing opened its doors in 1992, becoming the first European five-star hotel in Beijing. The hotel is located in Chaoyang District, in the East Third Ring Road, in the diplomatic and business area. Kempinski Hotel Beijing houses 480 newly renovated guestrooms and suites, ten fully equipped banquet and conference facilities, two private gardens and seven international restaurants and bars. Last hotel renovation was in 2019. Kempinski Hotel Beijing has housed heads of state and royal family visits. Kempinski Hotel Beijing is known for its annual events, including the Vienna Ball and Oktoberfest. The hotel shares the Beijing Lufthansa Center complex, with offices, apartments and showrooms, You Yi Shopping City, banks, airline offices, a 24-hour international clinic, the "Beijing International Medical Center," a health club and a kindergarten.

== Restaurants ==
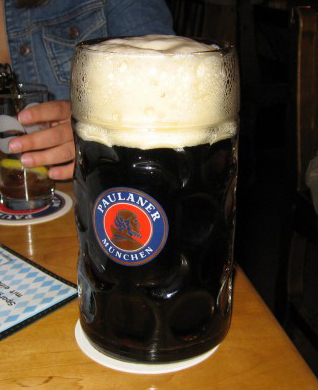
Paulaner beer

There are seven restaurants including the lobby bar Rendezvous, Signature's Restaurant, Paulaner Bräuhaus, Kempi Deli, Via Roma, Dragon Palace and Honzen.

== Annual events ==
Annual events have included:

- Kempinski Vienna Ball
- Oktoberfest Beijing at Paulaner Brauhaus
- Holiday Celebrations at Paulaner Brauhaus and Signature's
- Christmas Tree Lighting Ceremonies and Markets
- Concertini featuring local performers

== Awards ==
- 2019 Business Traveller China Award
