= DarGlobal =

Dubai based real estate company

Dar Global PLC
- Industry: Real Estate
- Founded: 2017; 9 years ago
- Headquarters: Riyadh, Saudi Arabia
- Key people: Ziad Elchaar (CEO)
- Website: darglobal.co.uk.

Dar Global PLC is a real estate development company headquartered in Riyadh, Saudi Arabia, and is publicly listed on the London Stock Exchange (LSE). The company began trading on the LSE on February 28, 2023, becoming the first Saudi company to be listed on the main market of the London Stock Exchange.

The company has delivered a number of projects which were funded by the Public Investment Fund, which the New York Times claimed this demonstrated ties to the Saudi government. The company is heavily invested in Trump family properties.

== History ==
Dar Global was established in 2017 as a real estate subsidiary of Dar Al Arkan. It initially focused its residential development projects in the Middle East and Europe. Dar Global's first project of note got underway in 2021. The construction project was in United Arab Emirates, consisting of a 34-storey residential tower, located next to the Dubai Water Canal. The building topped out in 2022 and was branded as the Urban Oasis Tower. It was developed in partnership with Italian fashion house, Missoni.

Dar Global was originally established to develop the assets of Dar Al Arkan Real Estate Development PJSC (DAARE), a real estate developer in KSA.

Dar Global was listed on the Main Market of the London Stock Exchange on February 28, 2023. In doing so it was given a valuation of $600 million.

Dar Global has delivered a compounded 500,000 square meters of commercial space and over 15,300 residential units, with assets valued at US$8.6 billion as of March 2023.

Beginning in 2023, Dar Global announced its first partnership with China State Construction, at the time the world's largest construction company. The partnership was for the construction of the developers latest residential development in Dubai, the W Residences. During the same year, the firm announced its first project in the Kingdom of Saudi Arabia.

In 2024, through a partnership with the luxury car manufacturer Aston Martin Dar Global announced the start of the counstruction of The Astera in the United Arab Emirates. The Astera is located on Al Marjan Island and is a residential beachfront property, costing $238 million to construct.

The company is heavily invested in Trump family properties. By 2025, during the Second Donald Trump administration, Trump-branded properties accounted for 18% of Dar Global's entire portfolio.

In Oman, the development group unveiled a Nickelodeon-themed hotel, in partnership with the US-based entertainment group. Dar Global continued the expansion of its luxury real estate portfolio with the launch of a villa-focused development in partnership with Fendi Casa, a subsidiary of the fashion house of the same name. The luxury villas would be sea-front within its AIDA development masterplan.

In early 2026, the development group announced its plans to begin development of Amaya in Jeddah, Saudi Arabia. The media often referred to the development as the Beverly Hills of Jeddah. The masterplan spans 1 million square meters in a central location within the city. In August 2026, Dar Global began awarding contracts for the construction of The Trump International Hotel and Tower in Dubai. The 350-meter mixed-use skyscraper would have a construction cost of $1 billion and is planned to open in 2030.
