= Hotel Vier Jahreszeiten (Hamburg) =

Hotel in Hamburg, Germany

Fairmont Hotel Vier Jahreszeiten
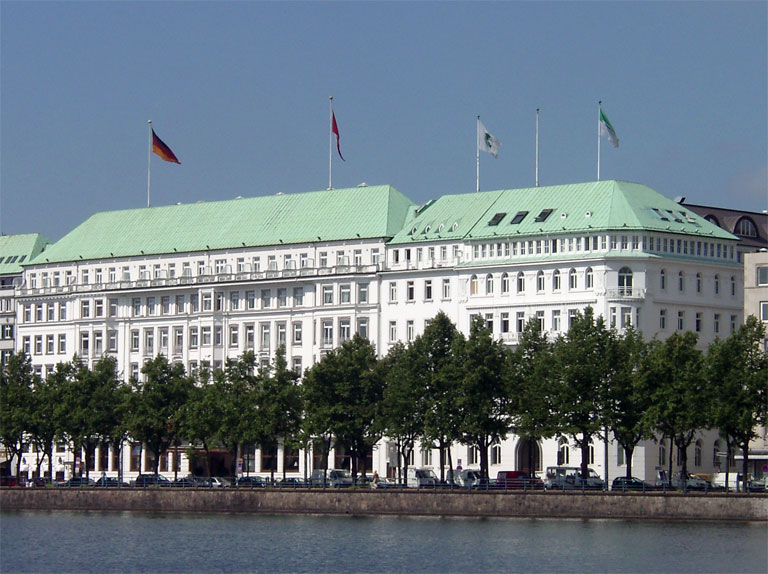

General information
- Location: Hamburg, Germany, Neuer Jungfernstieg 9–14, 20354 Hamburg
- Coordinates: 53°33′20″N 9°59′30″E
- Opened: 1897; 129 years ago
- Owner: Dohle Group
- Operator: Fairmont Hotels & Resorts

Other information
- Number of rooms: 156
- Number of restaurants: 7
- Number of bars: 2

Website
- www.hvj.de

The Fairmont Hotel Vier Jahreszeiten is a luxury hotel located on the Neuer Jungfernstieg in Hamburg, Germany. It is recognized as one of the top hotels in the world. The hotel has received numerous national and international awards.

== History ==
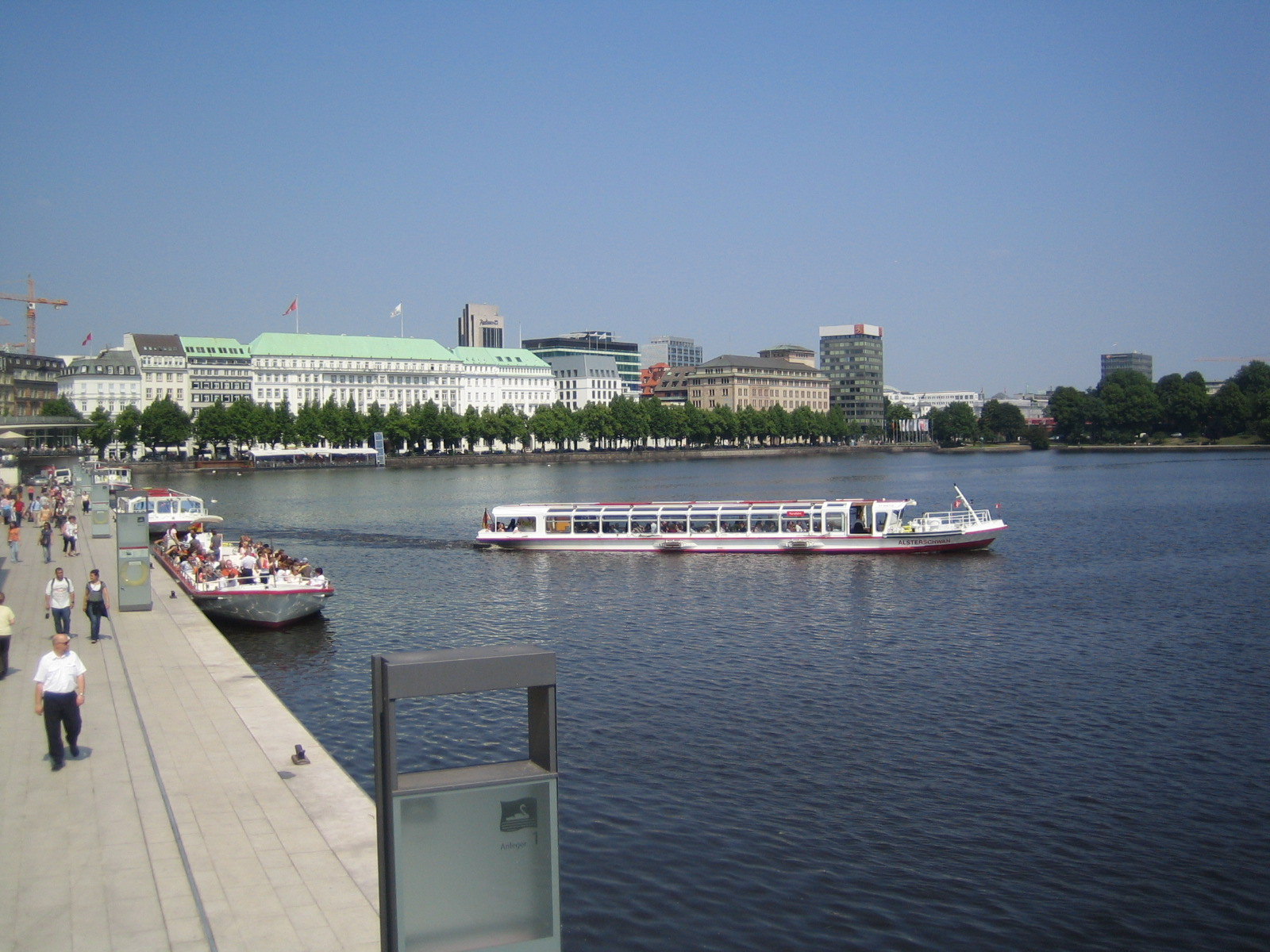
Hotel Vier Jahreszeiten as seen across the Binnenalster

Friedrich Haerlin bought a small building with just 11 rooms and 3 bathrooms on the west side of the Inner Alster at an auction on 24 February 1897. Haerlin transformed the building into a luxury hotel, naming it the Hotel Vier Jahreszeiten. In 1905, he opened an extension to the hotel, increasing it to 57 rooms. In 1911, the hotel was expanded again, to a total of 140 bedrooms and 50 bathrooms.

In 1915, soon after the outbreak of World War I, the hotel was commandeered by the High Command of Coastal Defence. Haerlin’s three sons were drafted. Two, Otto and Wilhelm, died at the front in Flanders while his third son, Fritz, survived the war. During the German Revolution of 1918–1919, mutinous sailors shelled the hotel from the nearby Alsterpavillon. The revolutionary Supreme Marine Council took over the hotel from November 1918 to March 1919. The looted and damaged hotel had to be completely renovated. In 1919, the hotel opened the Haerlin Restaurant, followed by the Art Deco style Jahreszeiten Grill in 1925.

In 1928, all of the guest rooms were upgraded and a 5th-floor balcony was constructed. In addition to this, the multiple structures were unified with the addition of the hotel's trademark green copper roof. In 1932, Fritz Haerlin took over the hotel from his father. During the 1930s, Fritz invested in distinctive restaurants and bars and opened the Biedermeier-style Café Condi and the Jahreszeiten Keller (since 1998 known as Doc Cheng's).

During World War II, the hotel was only slightly damaged by Allied air raids. After the end of the war, the hotel served as the headquarters of the British 7th Armoured Division until 1952. On 4 April 1952, the hotel’s reopening took place. In 1966, the hotel became a member of The Leading Hotels of the World alliance. In 1973, Gert Pranter became hotel director.

In 1989, the Haerlin heirs sold the hotel for 215 million Deutsche Marks to the Japanese Aoki Corporation, which placed the property in its Westin Hotels division in 1991. Aoki resold the hotel to Raffles International Limited on 31 July 1997, and it was renamed Raffles Hotel Vier Jahreszeiten.

On 1 October 1997, Ingo C. Peters was appointed as the new director of the hotel. In 2006, Raffles Hotels and Fairmont Hotels & Resorts were merged into Fairmont Raffles Hotels International, and the hotel was renamed Fairmont Hotel Vier Jahreszeiten on 30 April 2007. During the period from 2007 to 2010, the hotel was renovated for around 25 million euros.

In February 2013, the family-owned retail chain Dohle acquired the hotel for 35 million euros. Management remained with Fairmont Hotels & Resorts. Dohle renovated the 156 guest rooms, the restaurants, and spa facilities.

Over the past decade, the hotel's Restaurant Haerlin has received many Michelin Guide awards and, since 2010, under the management of Christoph Rüffer, has received two Michelin stars.
