= Palm Jumeirah =

Human-made archipelago in Dubai, UAE

Native name: نخلة جميرا Nickname: The Palm
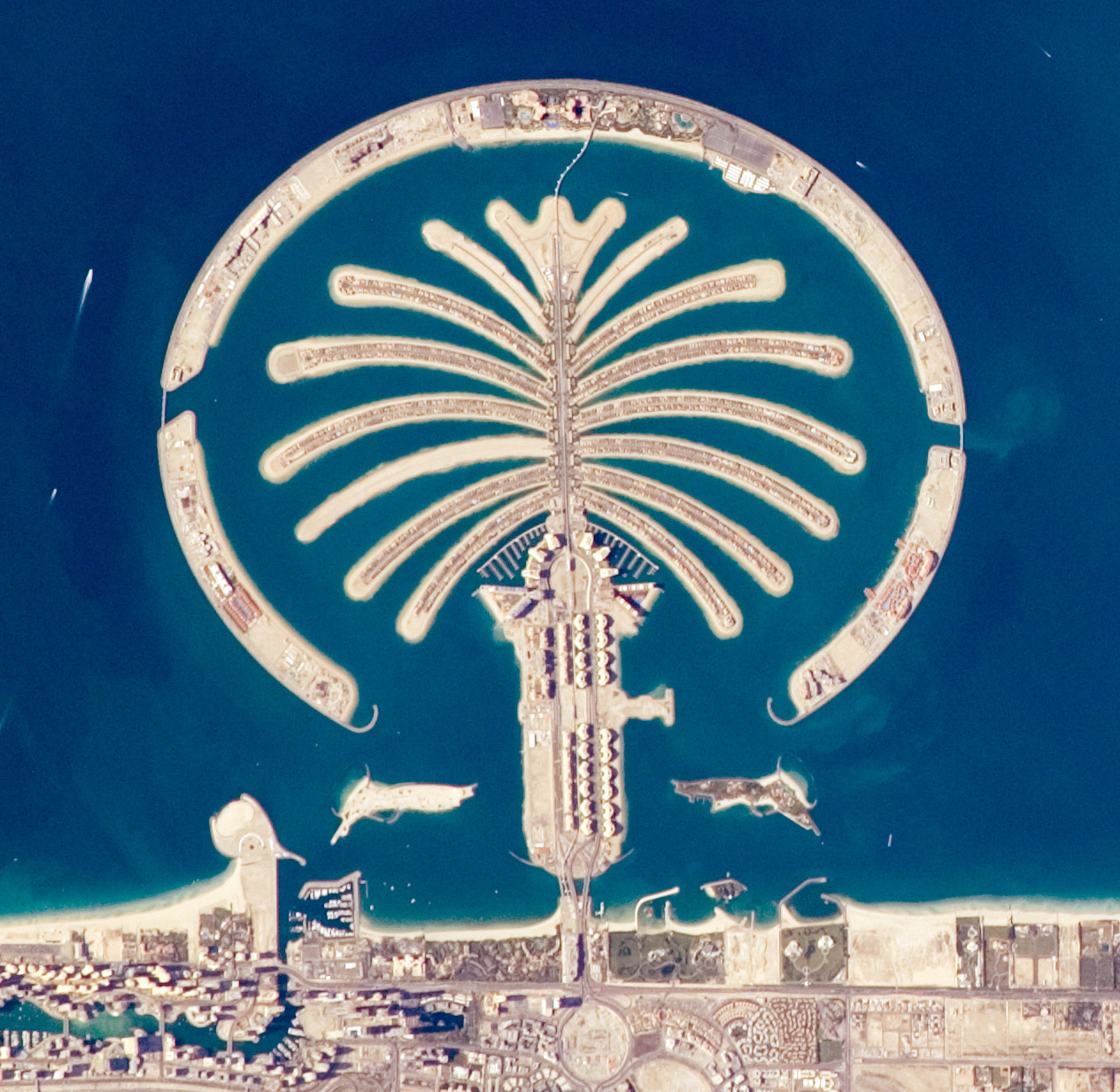
- Satellite view of The Palm Jumeirah

- Location within the Emirate of Dubai

Geography
- Location: Persian Gulf
- Coordinates: 25°07′05″N 55°08′00″E

Administration
- Dubai; United Arab Emirates

Demographics
- Population: 25,550

The Palm Jumeirah, also known as the Palm Islands, (Arabic: نخلة جميرا) is an archipelago of artificial islands on the Persian Gulf in Jumeirah, Dubai, United Arab Emirates. It is part of a larger series of developments called the Palm Islands, including Palm Jebel Ali and the Dubai Islands, which, when completed, will together increase Dubai's shoreline by a total of 520 kilometres (320 mi). It has a population of over 25,000 as of 2022.

The islands were created using land reclamation. They were created to resemble a palm tree when seen from the air, and are roughly divided into three areas: "trunk", "fronds", and "outer crescent". The trunk is a mixed commercial and residential area, the fronds are reserved for residential homes and villas, while the outer crescent is used for luxury and upscale resorts.

The Palm Jumeirah was constructed by a Dutch specialist dredging company, Van Oord. The same company also created The World Islands.

== Construction ==
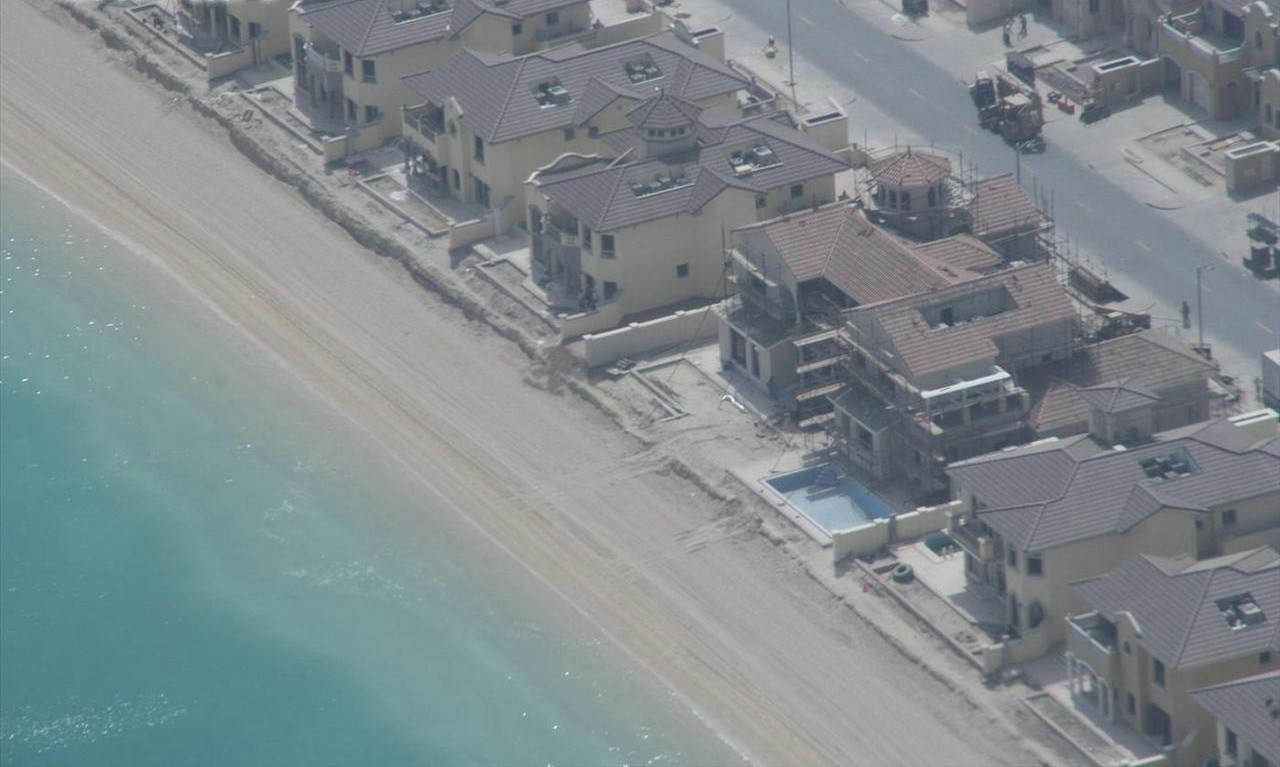
The Palm Jumeirah Dubai, Villas on a frond

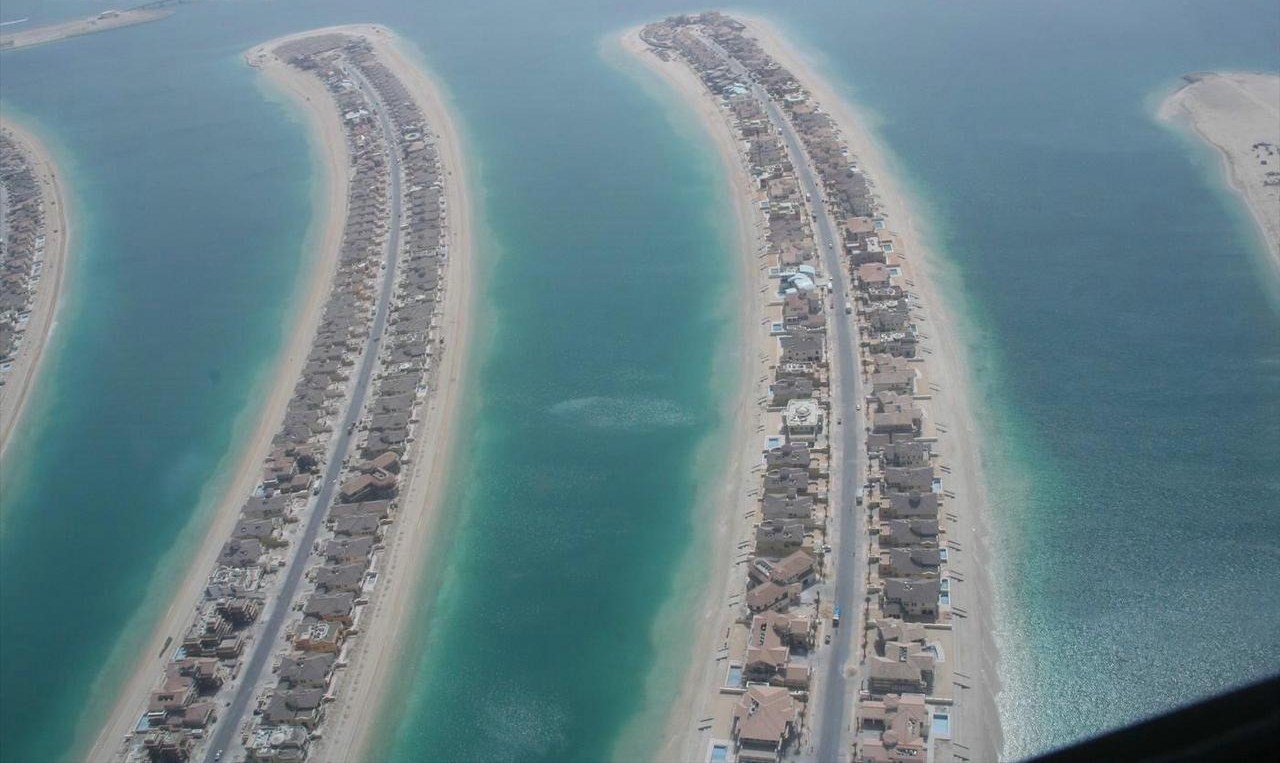
The Palm Jumeirah Dubai's frond

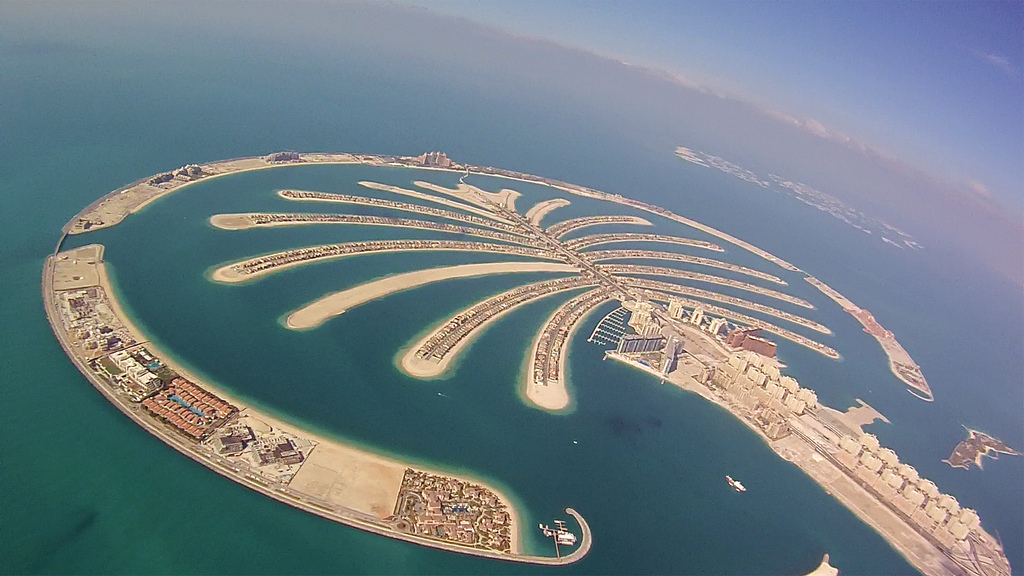
The Palm Jumeirah Dubai aerial view on 5 January 2013

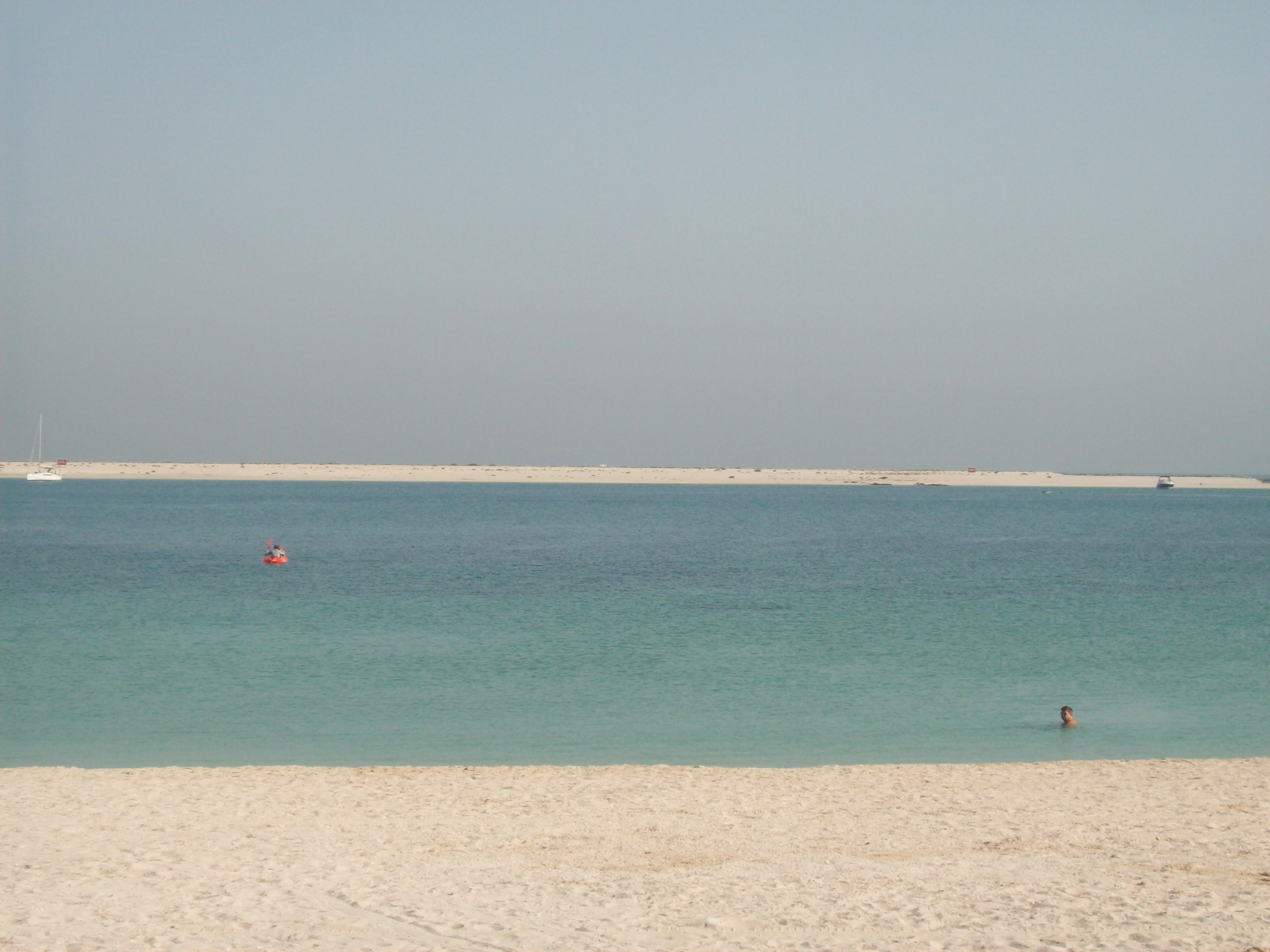
Shoreline Beach in The Palm Jumeirah Dubai

Construction of The Palm Jumeirah Dubai island began in June 2001 by stacking stones and sand to make the island foundation, and the developers announced handover of the first residential units in 2006.

In October 2007, 75% of the properties were ready to hand over, with 500 families already residing on the island. By the end of 2009, 28 hotels were opened on the Crescent.

In 2009, The New York Times reported that NASA's laser altimeter satellites had measured the Palm as sinking at the rate of 5 mm (0.20 in) per year. In response the developer, Nakheel Properties said they had received no reports of structural problems of a type that would be expected if there were any subsidence, and pointed out that the laser satellites had a measurement resolution of only 50 mm (2.0 in).

The entrance to the Fairmont Hotel was set alight by an Iranian missile in response to the 2026 Israeli–United States strikes on Iran.

== Transportation ==
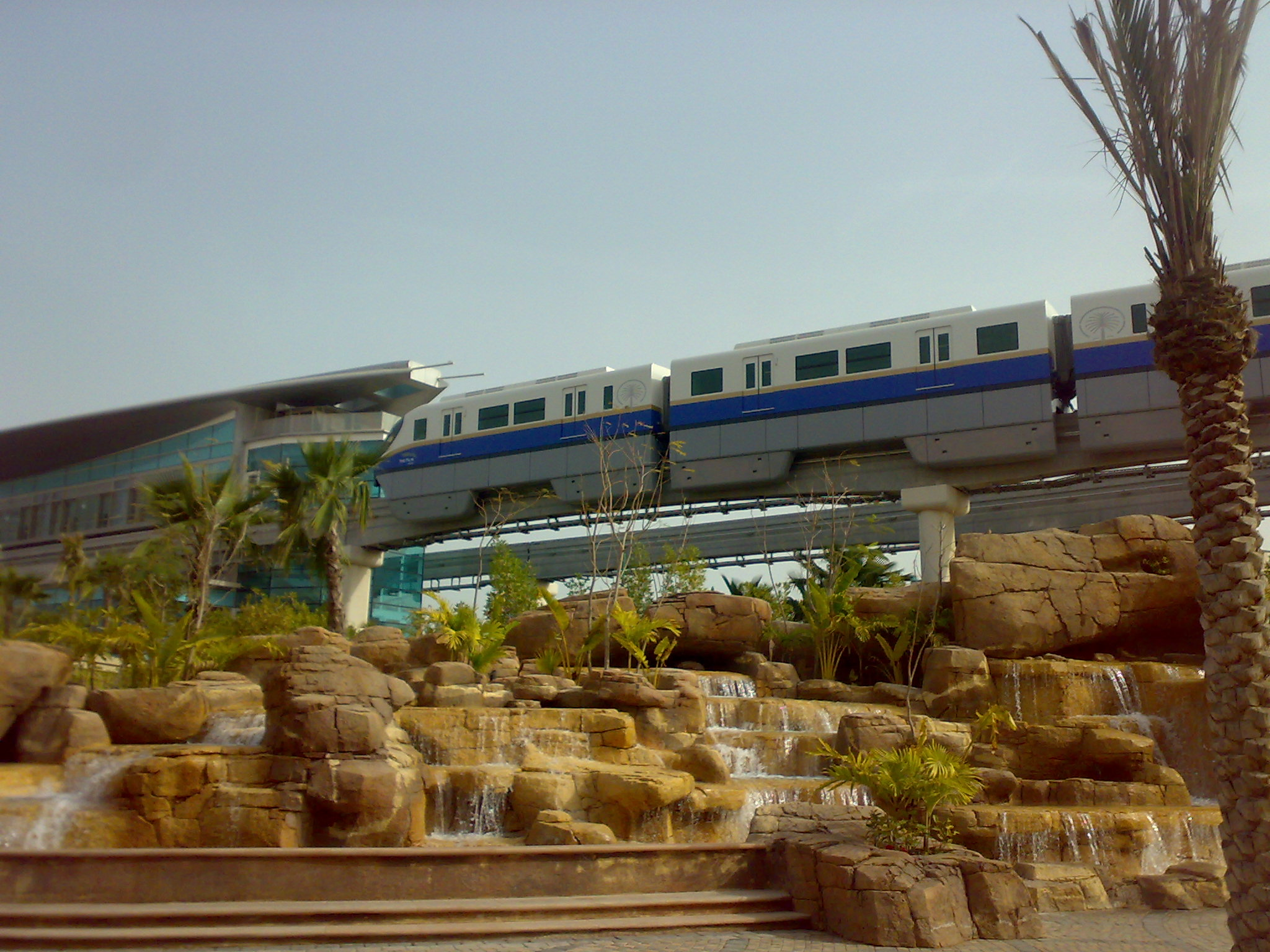
The Palm Jumeirah Dubai's Monorail

The Palm Jumeirah Monorail is a 5.4-kilometre-long (3.4 mi) monorail connecting the Atlantis Hotel to the Gateway Towers at the foot of the island. The monorail connects The Palm Jumeirah Dubai to the mainland, with a planned further extension to the Red Line of the Dubai Metro. The line began operating on 30 April 2009. It is the first monorail in the Middle East.

== Environment ==
According to a study published in the journal Water in 2022, the construction of this island has had an effect on increasing water-soluble materials, changing the spectral profile of water and also increasing the temperature of the water surface around the island.

The outer breakwater was designed as a continuous barrier, but by preventing natural tidal movement, the seawater within the Palm became stagnant. The breakwater was subsequently modified to create gaps on either side, allowing tidal movement to oxygenate the water within and prevent it from stagnating, albeit less efficiently than would be the case if the breakwater did not exist.

In the summer seasons, jellyfish frequent the beaches surrounding the Palm. In early 2020, due to the reduction of human activity during the COVID-19 pandemic, an increase in wildlife, such as dolphins, around The Palm Jumeirah was observed.

== Housing density ==
After launching the project, it was revealed that the developer increased the number of residential units on the island (with a concomitant reduction in the amount of physical space between individual properties) from the originally announced 4,500 (comprising 2,000 villas purchased early in the expectation of greater separation between properties). This increase was attributed to the developer miscalculating the actual cost of construction and requiring the raising of additional capital, although they had never commented publicly on the matter. The New York Times reported in 2009 that many people had bought houses before they were built and are furious about the space available now and the way they seem to be living on top of each other.

== Residential properties ==
Palm Jumeirah has a varied array of buildings, ranging from townhouses to hotels to apartments and villas. The apartments are mostly concentrated on the Trunk, while the Fronds are bordered with villas.

Apartments range in size from 375 to 11,774 square feet (34.8 to 1,093.8 m^{2}), from studios to 6-bedroom layouts. Each apartment normally has a large living space, en-suite bathrooms, fitted kitchens, and balconies or patios.

The community has villas with sizes between 4,000 and 35,000 square feet (370 and 3,250 m^{2}) ranging from 2 to 10 bedrooms. There is direct beach access from these villas, which range in style from classic Arabic designs to modern high-tech alternatives.

== Notable residents ==
- Grigory Anikeev, one of the wealthiest deputies of the Russian State Duma, bought a $13 million penthouse apartment in the Serenia Residences of Palm Jumeirah in March 2022, shortly after the start of Russo-Ukrainian war.
- Mykola Zlochevskiy, a Ukrainian oil and natural gas businessman and oligarch who was Minister of Ecology and Natural Resources in the Viktor Yanukovych administration, owns two apartments in the W Residences worth $11 million. Ukrainian authorities accused Zlochevskiy of embezzlement, leading him to plead guilty while transferring ownership of the properties to his daughter.
- Balvinder Singh Sahni, Indian businessman
- Joseph Johannes Leijdekkers, a Dutchman who goes by the name 'Chubby Jos', and is on European Union's Most Wanted List for alleged narcotics trafficking, is a resident in the Grandeur Residences of Palm Jumeirah.
- Danilo Vunjao Santana Gouveia, a Brazilian who goes by Dubaiano, and was indicted in Brazil for fraud and moneylaundering in relation to a Bitcoin pyramid scheme, is a resident in the Palm Tower Dubai.
- Obaid Khanani, a Pakistani national who was sanctioned by the U.S. in 2016 for alleged moneylaundering for drug traffickers and organized crime groups, is a resident in Five Palm Jumeirah.
- The ruling Aliyev family of Azerbaijan owns multiple properties in the Palm Jumeirah.
- Samuele Landi, an Italian fugitive businessperson, owns a villa in the Palm Jumeirah.
- Rasul Danialzadeh, an Iranian steel magnate sentenced to 16 years in prison for bribery, owns a villa in the Palm Jumeirah.

== Hotels and resorts ==
As of 2024, The Palm Jumeirah Dubai has around 30 hotels, located in the trunk and outer crescent of the palm.

=== Trunk ===
- Adagio Premium The Palm
- Andaz Dubai The Palm
- Cheval Maison The Palm Dubai
- Dukes The Palm, a Royal Hideaway Hotel
- Fairmont The Palm
- FIVE Palm Jumeirah Hotel
- Hilton Dubai Palm Jumeirah
- Marriott Resort Palm Jumeirah Dubai
- NH Collection Dubai The Palm
- Radisson Beach Resort Palm Jumeirah
- The St. Regis Dubai The Palm
- Voco Dubai The Palm

=== Outer crescent ===
- Aloft Palm Jumeirah
- Anantara The Palm Dubai Resort
- Atlantis, The Palm
- Atlantis The Royal, Dubai
- C Central Resort The Palm
- Jumeirah Zabeel Saray
- Kempinski Hotel & Residences Palm Jumeirah
- One&Only The Palm
- Raffles The Palm Dubai
- Rixos The Palm Hotel & Suites
- Royal Central Hotel The Palm
- Sofitel Dubai The Palm Resort & Spa
- Taj Exotica Resort & Spa The Palm Dubai
- Th8 Palm Dubai Beach Resort, Vignette Collection
- The Retreat Palm Dubai, MGallery by Sofitel
- W Dubai The Palm
- Waldorf Astoria Dubai Palm Jumeirah
- Wyndham Residences The Palm

== Retail and dining destinations ==
- Al Ittihad Park
- Choi Bar
- Club Vista Mare
- Golden Mile Galleria
- Nakheel Mall
- Palm Views West and East
- The Boardwalk

== See also ==
- Palm Islands
- The World (archipelago)
- Tourism in Dubai
- Palm Grandeur
- Jumeirah Islands
- The Taj Exotica Hotel & Resort
- Longshore drift
