= List of tallest structures in China =

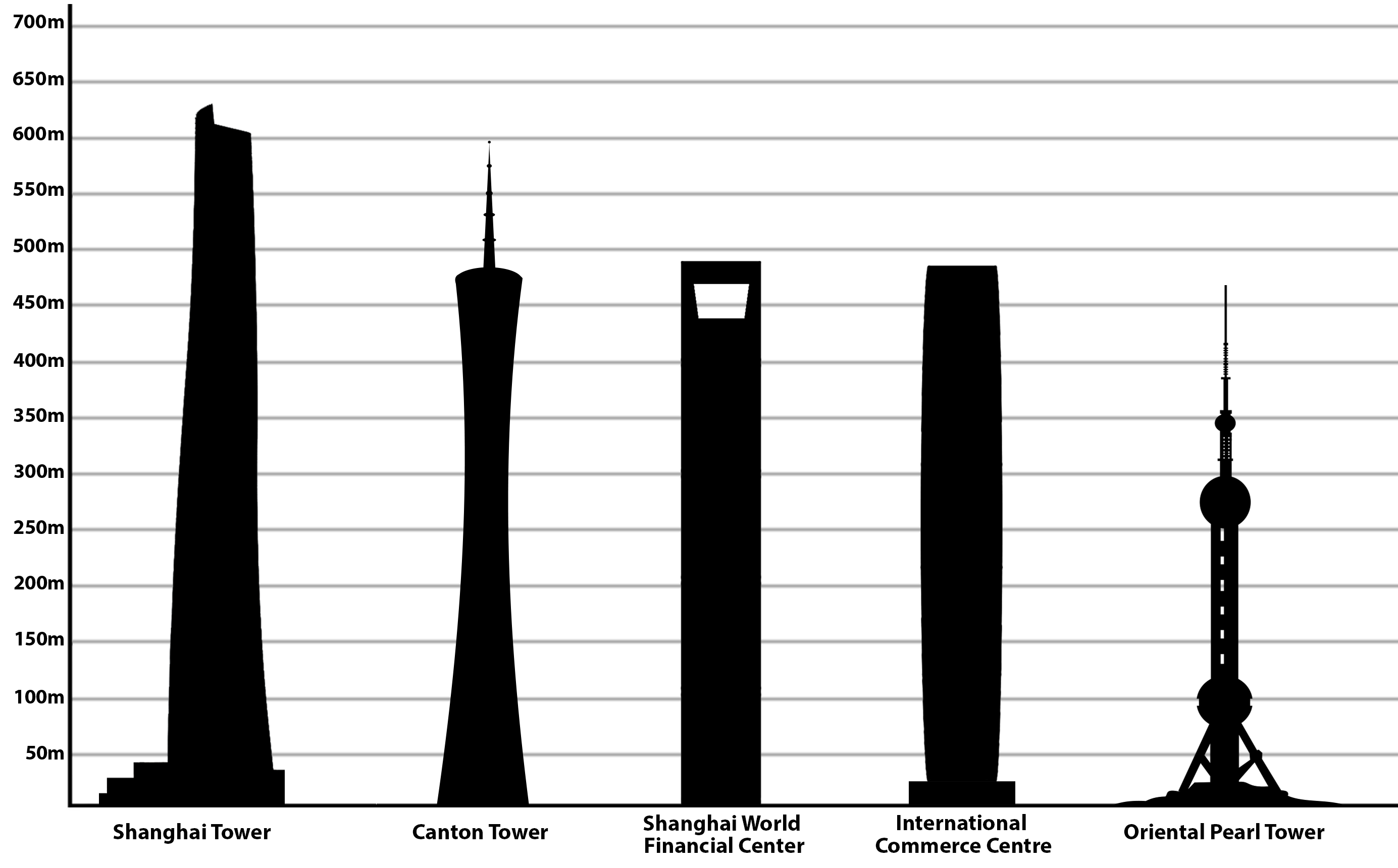
Tallest structures in China in 2015

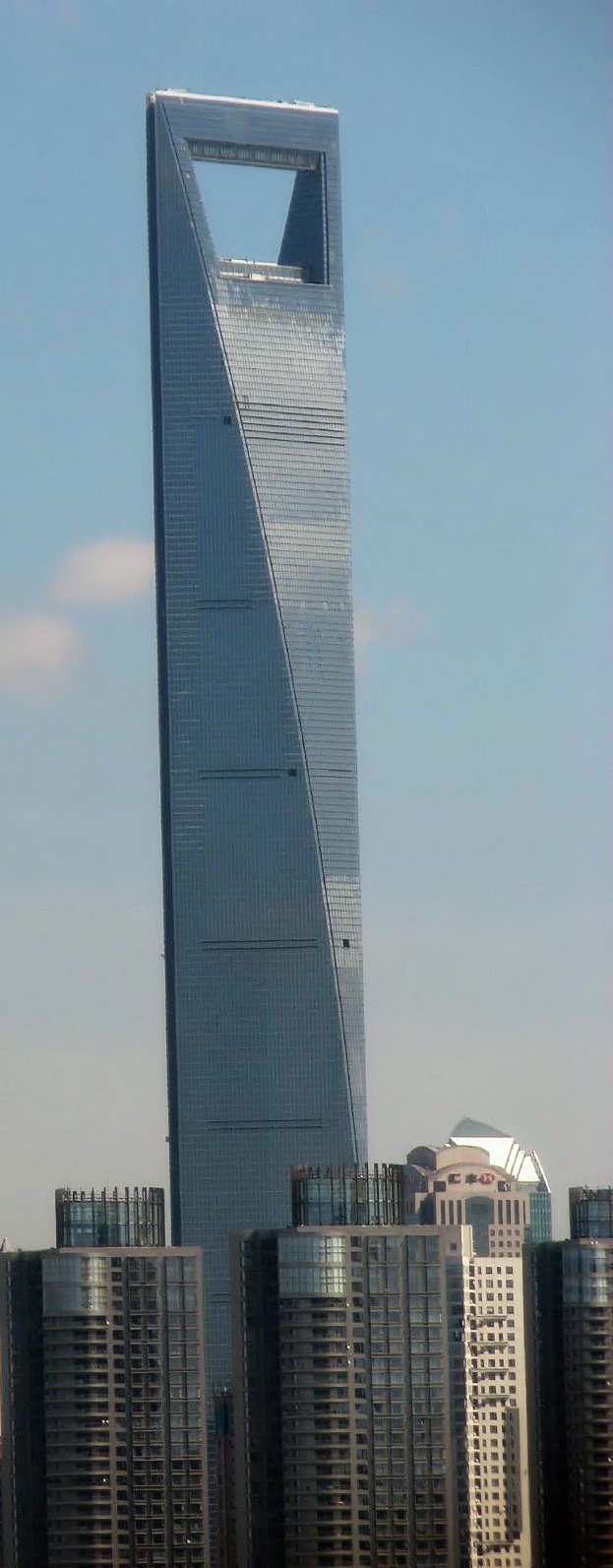
Shanghai World Financial Center, third tallest

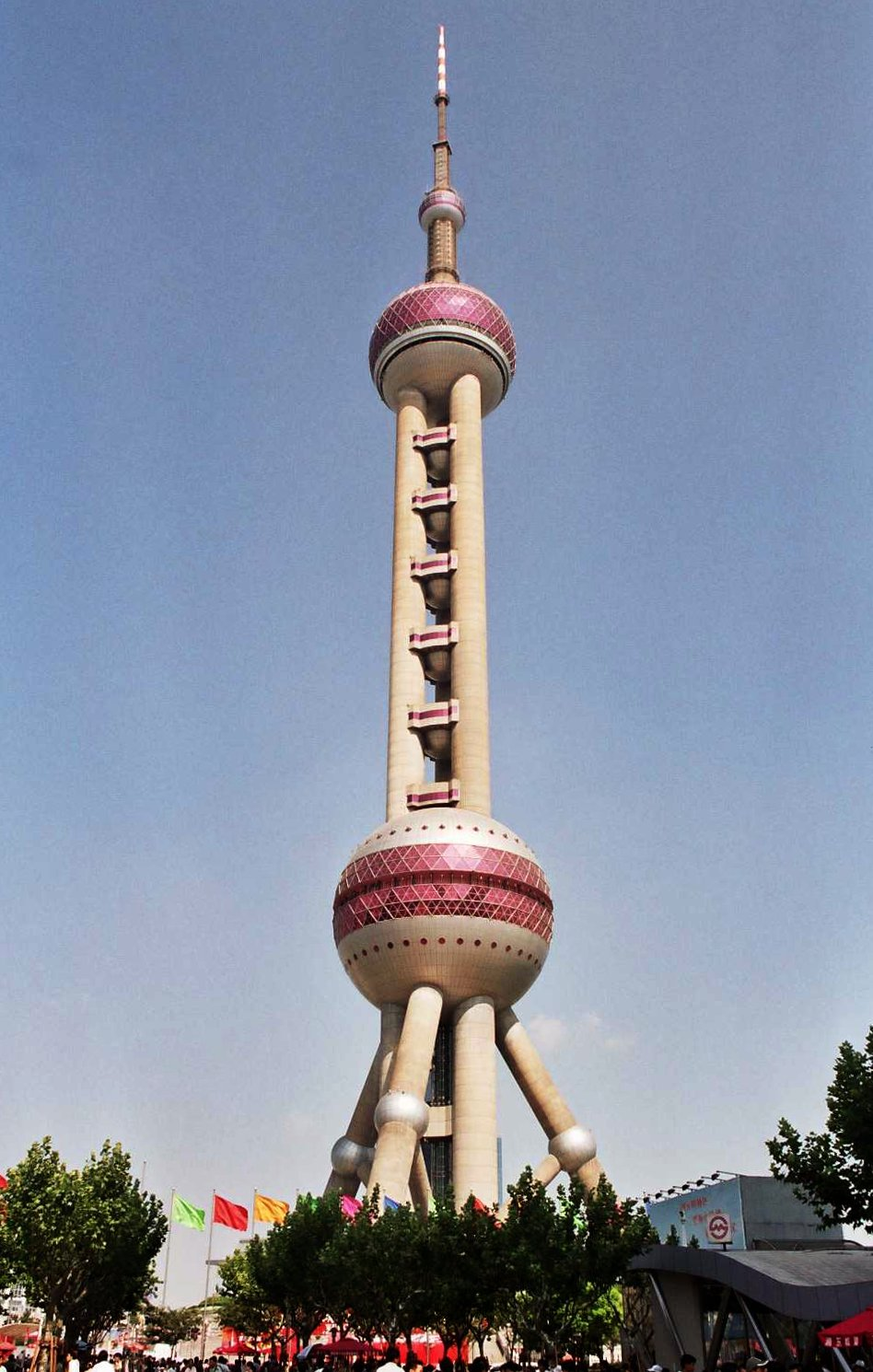
Oriental Pearl Tower, fifth tallest

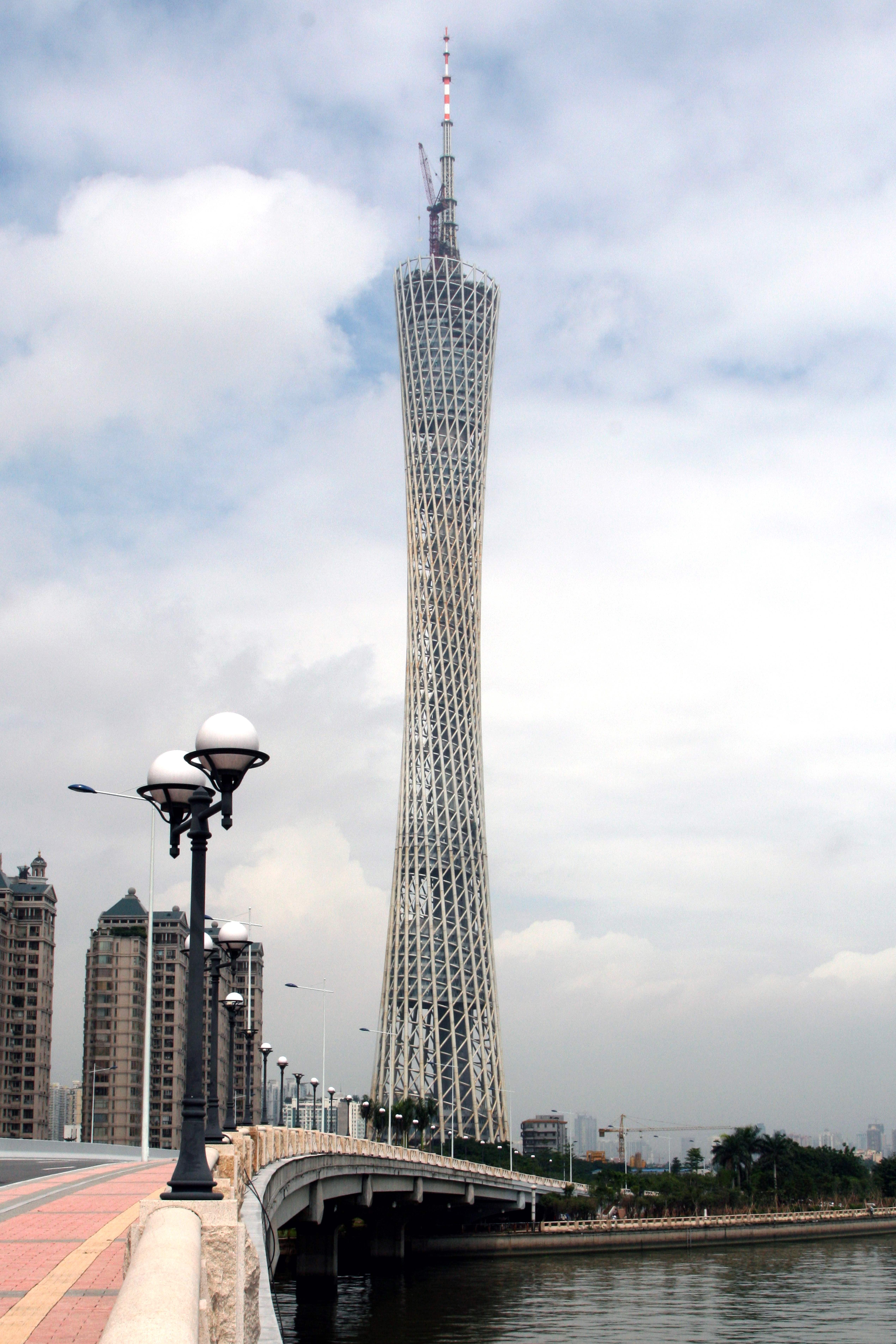
Canton Tower, second tallest at 600m (1,989ft)

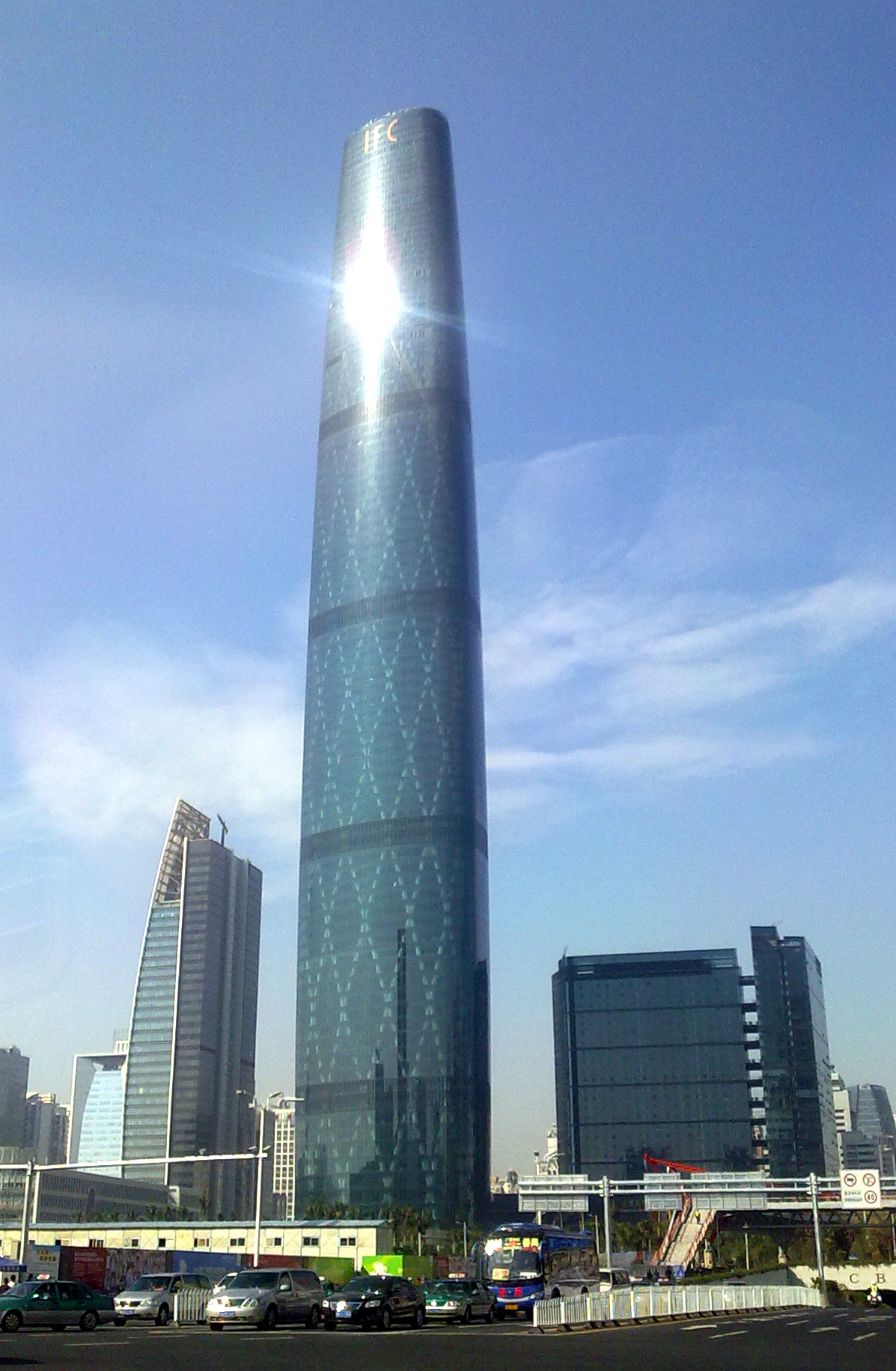
Guangzhou International Finance Center

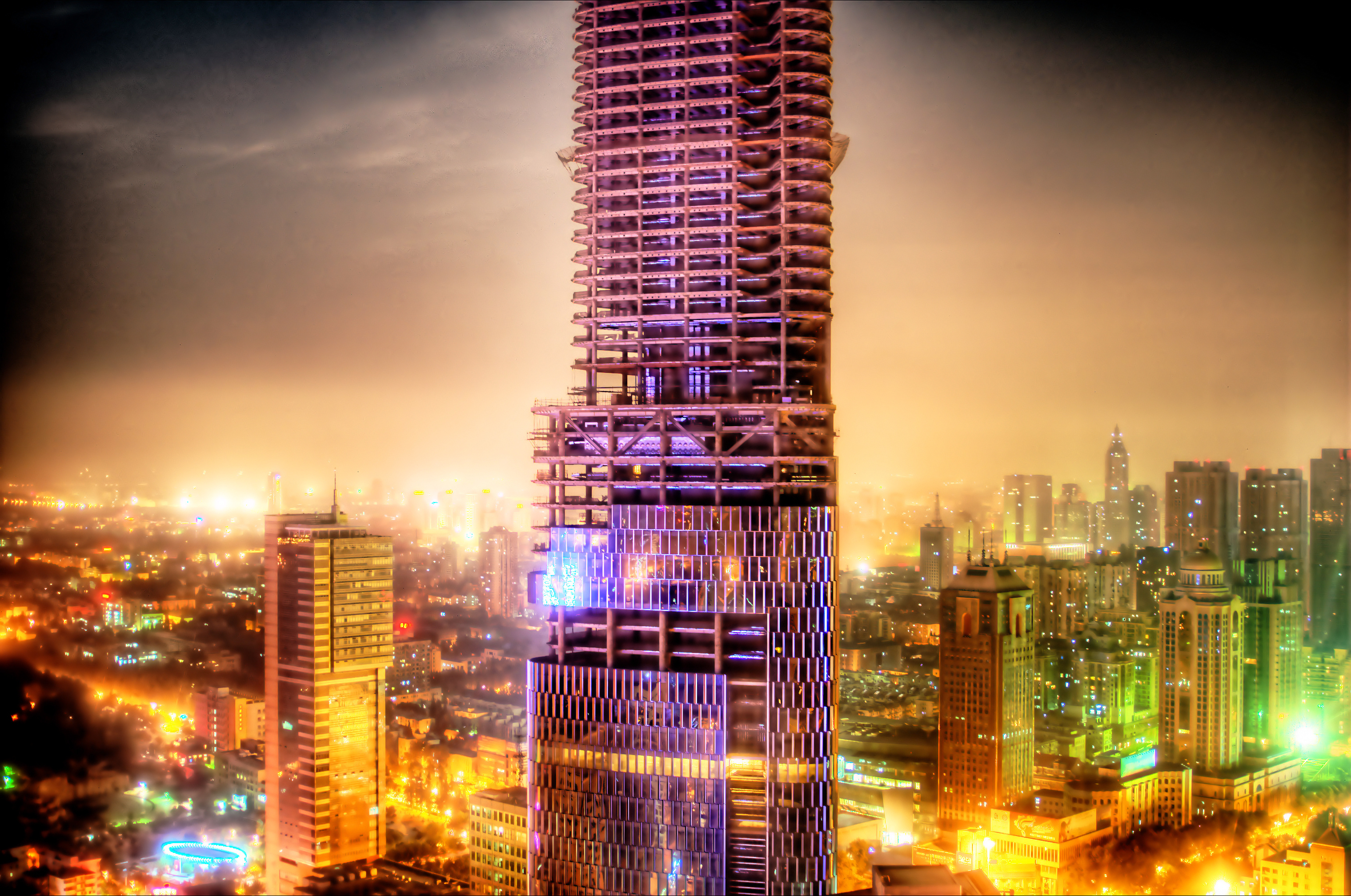
Zifeng Tower

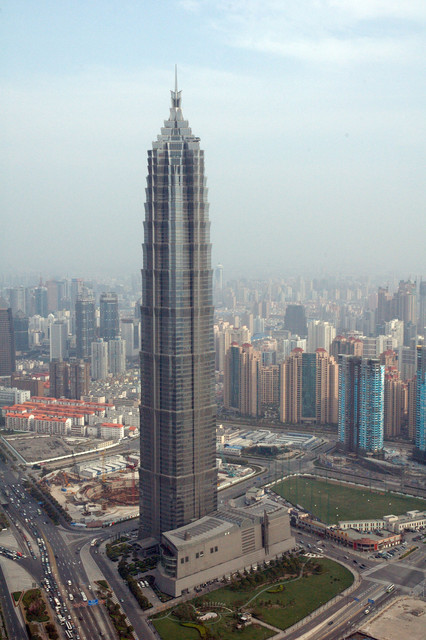
Jin Mao Tower

This list of the tallest buildings and structures in China ranks structures in China that stand at least 250 m (820 ft) tall by height. The list includes buildings located in Macau but not those found in Hong Kong, which are featured in their own list.

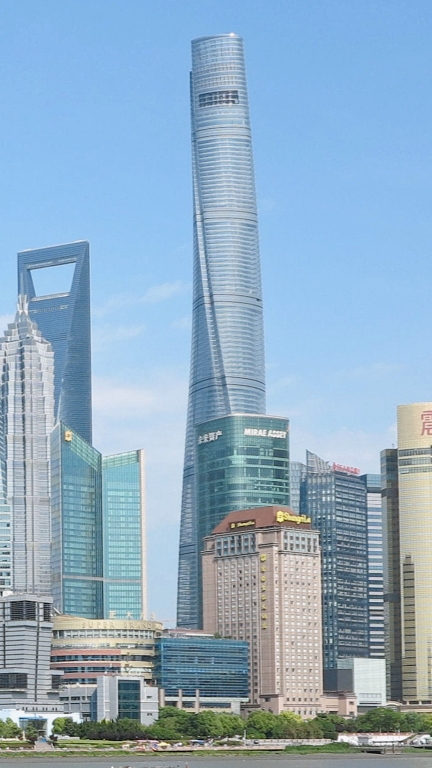
Shanghai Tower

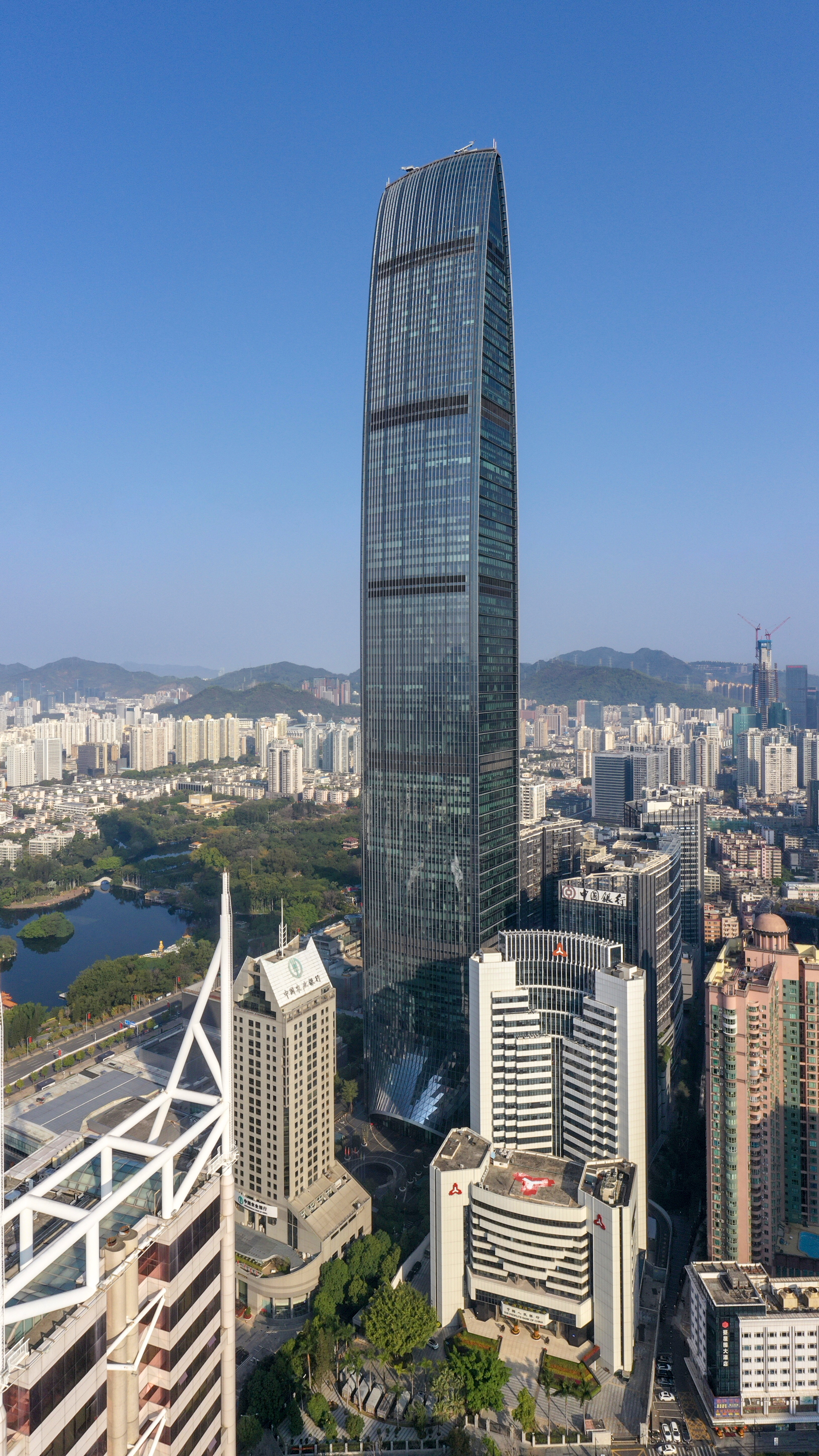
KK100

== Current ==
Rank	Construction	Year	Construction type	City	Pinnacle height	Floor count
1	Shanghai Tower	2015	Skyscraper	Shanghai	632 m (2,073 ft)	128
2	Canton Tower	2010	TV tower	Guangzhou	604 m (1,982 ft)	37
3	Pingan International Finance Centre	2017	Skyscraper	Shenzhen	599 m (1,965 ft)	115
4	Guangzhou CTF Finance Centre	2016	Skyscraper	Guangzhou	530 m (1,740 ft)	111
5	Tianjin CTF Finance Centre	2019	Skyscraper	Tianjin	530 m (1,740 ft)	97
6	China Zun	2018	Skyscraper	Beijing	528 m (1,732 ft)	109
7	Shanghai World Financial Center	2008	Skyscraper	Shanghai	492 m (1,614 ft)	101
8	Oriental Pearl Television Tower	1994	Concrete tower	Shanghai	468 m (1,535 ft)	14
9	Zifeng Tower	2010	Skyscraper	Nanjing	450 m (1,480 ft)	66
10	Kingkey 100	2011	Skyscraper	Shenzhen	441.8 m (1,449 ft)	100
11	Guangzhou International Finance Center	2010	Skyscraper	Guangzhou	440 m (1,440 ft)	103
12	Wuhan Center	2019	Skyscraper	Wuhan	438 m (1,437 ft)	92
13	Jin Mao Tower	1998	Skyscraper	Shanghai	421 m (1,381 ft)	88
14	Tianjin Radio & TV Tower	1991	Concrete tower	Tianjin	415 m (1,362 ft)	
15	Central Radio and TV Tower	1992	Concrete tower	Beijing	405 m (1,329 ft)	
16	Nanning China Resources Tower	2020	skyscraper	Nanning	403 m (1,322 ft)	87
17	CITIC Plaza	1997	Skyscraper	Guangzhou	391 m (1,283 ft)	80
18	Henan Province Radio & Television Tower	2011	Steel tower	Zhengzhou	388 m (1,273 ft)	
19	Shun Hing Square	1996	Skyscraper	Shenzhen	384 m (1,260 ft)	69
20	Eton Place Dalian Tower 1	2015	Skyscraper	Beijing	383.2 m (1,257 ft)	80
21	1 Corporate Avenue	2021	Skyscraper	Wuhan	376 m (1,234 ft)	73
22	Zhoushan Island Overhead Powerline Tie	2009	Lattic tower	Dinghai	370 m (1,210 ft)	
23	Forum 66 Tower 1	2015	Skyscraper	Shenyang	350.6 m (1,150 ft)	68
24	Yangtze River Crossing	2003	Lattice tower (electricity pylon)	Jiangyin	347 m (1,138 ft)	
25	West Pearl Tower	2004	Concrete tower	Chengdu	339 m (1,112 ft)	
25	Hefei Emerald TV Tower	2008	Steel tower	Hefei	339 m (1,112 ft)	
27	Macau Tower	2001	Concrete tower	Macau	338 m (1,109 ft)	
28	Dragon Tower	2000	Lattice tower	Harbin	336 m (1,102 ft)	
29	Shimao International Plaza	2006	Skyscraper	Shanghai	333 m (1,093 ft)	60
30	Minsheng Bank Building	2006	Skyscraper	Wuhan	331 m (1,086 ft)	68
31	IAP Meteorological Tower	1979	Guyed mast	Beijing	325 m (1,066 ft)	
32	China World Trade Center Tower 3	2008	Skyscraper	Beijing	330 m (1,080 ft)	
33	Wenzhou World Trade Center	2009	Skyscraper	Wenzhou	322 m (1,056 ft)	68
34	Wusung Radio Tower	1930s	Guyed mast	Wusung	321 m (1,053 ft)	
35	Jiangsu Nanjing TV Tower	1996	Concrete tower	Nanjing	319 m (1,047 ft)	
36	Tianjin Tower	2010	Skyscraper	Tianjin	337 m (1,106 ft)	74
37	Tortoise Mountain TV Tower	1986	concrete tower	Wuhan	311 m (1,020 ft)	
38	Liaoning Broadcast and TV Tower	1989	Concrete tower	Shenyang	306 m (1,004 ft)	
38	Pylons of Sutong Bridge	2008	Concrete pylons		306 m (1,004 ft)	
40	Jinping-I Hydropower Station	2013	Arch dam		305 m (1,001 ft)	
41	Zhuzhou Television Tower	1999	Concrete tower	Zhuzhou	293 m (961 ft)	
42	SEG Plaza	2000	Skyscraper	Shenzhen	292 m (958 ft)	67
43	Plaza 66	2001	Skyscraper	Shanghai	288 m (945 ft)	66
44	Tomorrow Square	2003	Skyscraper	Shanghai	285 m (935 ft)	63
45	Chongqing World Trade Center	2003	Skyscraper	Chongqing	283 m (928 ft)	60
46	Shijiazhuang TV-tower	1998	Concrete tower	Shijiazhuang	280 m (920 ft)	
47	Central Plains Pearl TV Tower	1998	Concrete tower	Luoyang	278 m (912 ft)	
47	Hong Kong New World Tower	2002	Skyscraper	Shanghai	278 m (912 ft)	
49	Diwang International Commerce Center	2006	Skyscraper	Nanning	276 m (906 ft)	
50	Wuhan World Trade Tower	1998	Skyscraper	Wuhan	273 m (896 ft)	58
51	China International Center	2007	Skyscraper	Guangzhou	270 m (890 ft)	
52	Dapeng International Plaza	1998	Skyscraper	Guangzhou	269 m (883 ft)	56
53	Kaifeng TV Tower	1995	Steel tower	Kaifeng	268 m (879 ft)	
54	Bocom Financial Towers	2002	Skyscraper	Shanghai	265 m (869 ft)	
55	Shenzhen Special Zone Press Tower	1998	Skyscraper	Shenzhen	262 m (860 ft)	
55	Grand Gateway Shanghai I	2005	Skyscraper	Shanghai	262 m (860 ft)	
55	Grand Gateway Shanghai II	2005	Skyscraper	Shanghai	262 m (860 ft)	
58	Daqing Radio and Television Tower	1989	Steel tower	Daqing	260 m (850 ft)	
58	Post & Telecommunication Hub	2003	Skyscraper	Guangzhou	260 m (850 ft)	
58	Fortune Plaza	2008	Skyscraper	Beijing	260 m (850 ft)	
61	Grand Lisboa	2008	Skyscraper	Macau	258 m (846 ft)	
62	Yangtze River Crossing Nanjing	1992	Concrete towers (electricity pylon)	Nanjing	257 m (843 ft)	
63	New Century Plaza Tower 1	2006	Skyscraper	Nanjing	255.2 m (837 ft)	48
64	Pylons of Pearl River Crossing	1987	Lattice towers (electricity pylon)		253 m (830 ft)	
65	Bank of Shanghai Headquarters	2005	Skyscraper	Shanghai	252 m (827 ft)	
66	Jiali Plaza	1997	Skyscraper	Wuhan	251 m (823 ft)	57
67	Bravo Park Place	2016	Skyscraper	Wuhan	250 m (820 ft)	55

== Under construction ==
This table ranks structures under construction with planned height at least 270 m (890 ft) by its planned height. It does not include structures that already reach their full height.

Name	Type	Pinnacle height	Completion	City
Greenland Jinmao International Financial Center	Skyscraper	499.8 metres (1,640 ft)	2028	Nanjing
Suzhou Zhongnan Center	Skyscraper	499.2 metres (1,638 ft)	2028	Suzhou
HeXi Yuzui Tower A	Skyscraper	498.8 metres (1,636 ft)	2028	Nanjing
Fuyuan Zhongshan 108 IFC	Skyscraper	498 metres (1,634 ft)	2029	Zhongshan
China International Silk Road Center	Skyscraper	498 metres (1,634 ft)	2025	Xi'an
Tianfu Center	Skyscraper	488.9 metres (1,604 ft)	2027	Chengdu
North Bund Tower	Skyscraper	480 metres (1,570 ft)	2030	Shanghai
Wuhan Greenland Center	Skyscraper	475.6 metres (1,560 ft)	2022	Wuhan
Fosun Bund Center T1	Skyscraper	470 metres (1,540 ft)	?	Wuhan
Chengdu Greenland Tower	Skyscraper	468 metres (1,535 ft)	2029	Chengdu
Guohua Financial Center Tower 1	Skyscraper	465 metres (1,526 ft)	?	Wuhan
Suzhou CSC Fortune Center	Skyscraper	460 metres (1,510 ft)	2028	Suzhou
China Resources Land Center	Skyscraper	450 metres (1,480 ft)	2028	Dongguan
Silk Road Pearl Tower	TV Tower	448 m (1,470 ft)	2024	Yinchuan
Haikou Tower 1	Skyscraper	428 m (1,404 ft)	2027	Haikou
Greenland Shandong International Financial Center	Skyscraper	428 m (1,404 ft)	2026	Jinan
Tsingshan Holdings Group Global Headquarters Tower 1	Skyscraper	418 m (1,371 ft)	?	Wenzhou
Ningbo Center	Skyscraper	409 m (1,342 ft)	2024	Ningbo
Shenzhen Bay Super Headquarters Base Tower C-1	Skyscraper	394 metres (1,293 ft)	2027	Shenzhen
China Merchants Bank Global Headquarters Main Tower	Skyscraper	387.4 metres (1,271 ft)	?	Shenzhen
Shenzhen Luohu Friendship Trading Centre	Skyscraper	379.9 metres (1,246 ft)	?	Shenzhen
China Merchants Prince Bay Tower	Skyscraper	374 metres (1,227 ft)	2028	Shenzhen
Nanchang Ping An Financial Center	Skyscraper	373 metres (1,224 ft)	2026	Nanchang
Shanghai International Trade Center Tower 1	Skyscraper	370 metres (1,210 ft)	2024	Shanghai
Lucheng Square	Skyscraper	369 m (1,211 ft)	?	Wenzhou
Hengli Global Operations Headquarters Tower 1	Skyscraper	369 m (1,211 ft)	2025	Suzhou
Fosun Bund Center T2	Skyscraper	356 metres (1,168 ft)	?	Wuhan
Shenzhen Bay Super Headquarters Base Tower C-2	Skyscraper	355.7 metres (1,167 ft)	2027	Shenzhen
Guohong Center	Skyscraper	350 m (1,150 ft)	2028	Wenzhou
Baolixian Village Old Reform Project Main	Skyscraper	350 metres (1,150 ft)	2026	Guangzhou
Poly Liangxi Plaz	Skyscraper	350 m (1,150 ft)	2026	Foshan
Zhonghai City Plaza	Skyscraper	339.9 m (1,115 ft)	2026	Tianjin
Guangjian Financial Center	Skyscraper	333 m (1,093 ft)	2027	Guangzhou
Jinqiao Sub-Center Block C1 Tower 1	Skyscraper	330 m (1,080 ft)	2026	Shanghai
Qingdao Landmark Tower	Skyscraper	327.3 m (1,074 ft)	2023	Qingdao
Hengyu Jinrong Center Block A	Skyscraper	310 metres (1,020 ft)	?	Shenzhen
Nanshan Science and Technology Union Building	Skyscraper	308.8 metres (1,013 ft)	2026	Shenzhen

the list of the tallest buildings and structures in China provides a glimpse into the nation's architectural and engineering achievements, focusing on structures reaching a height of at least 250 meters. These towering marvels grace the skylines of major Chinese cities, while Hong Kong maintains its separate list due to its unique status and urban development.

== See also ==
- List of tallest buildings in China
