= China State Construction =

China State Construction may refer to:

- China State Construction Engineering Corporation
- China State Construction International Holdings
