= List of tallest buildings in Chengdu =

Tall buildings in Chengdu
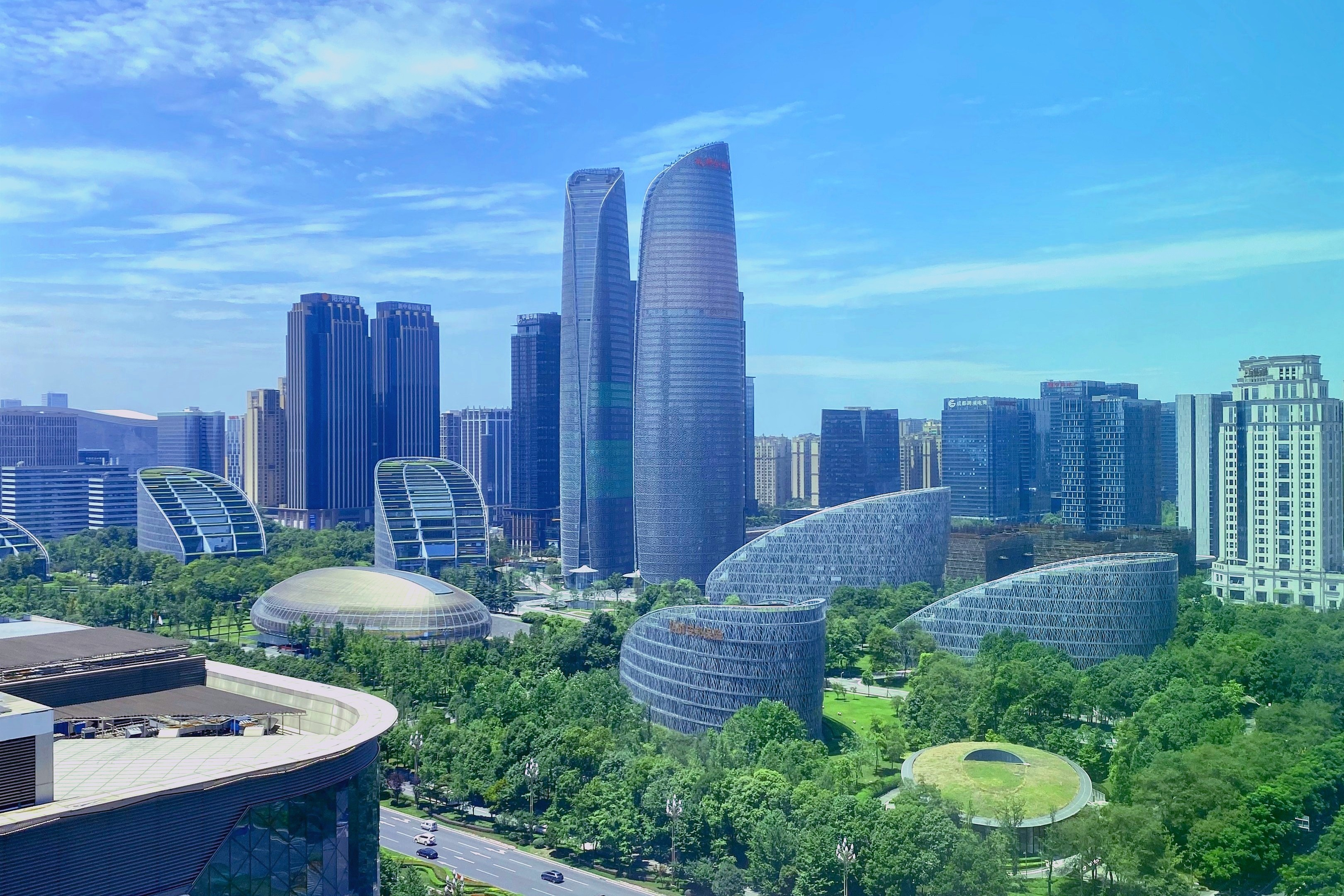
- Tianfu New Area with Tianfu IFC Twin Towers in the centre
- Tallest building: Tiantou International Business Center 1 (2021)
- Tallest building height: 284 m (982 ft)
- Tallest structure: Tianfu Panda Tower (2004)
- Tallest structure height: 339 m (1,112 ft)
- First 150 m+ building: Sichuan Bank of China (1994)

Number of tall buildings
- Taller than 150 m (492 ft): 127 (2025)
- Taller than 200 m (656 ft): 42 (2025)

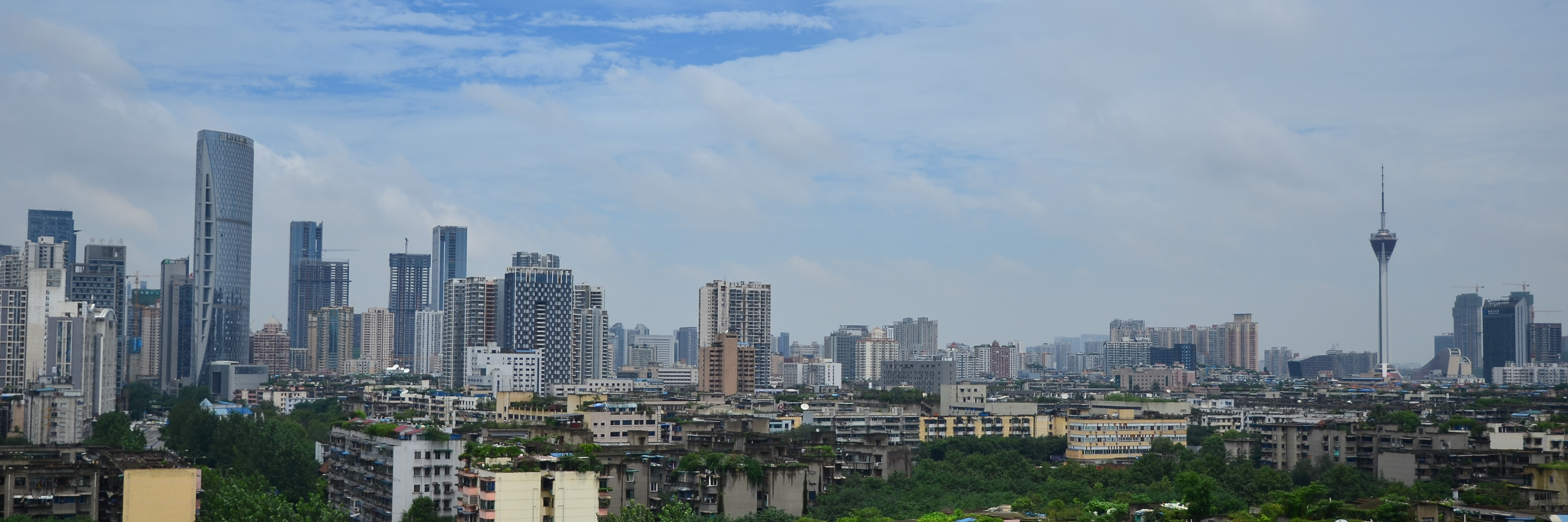
The Jinjiang CBD skyline with West Pearl Tower on the right

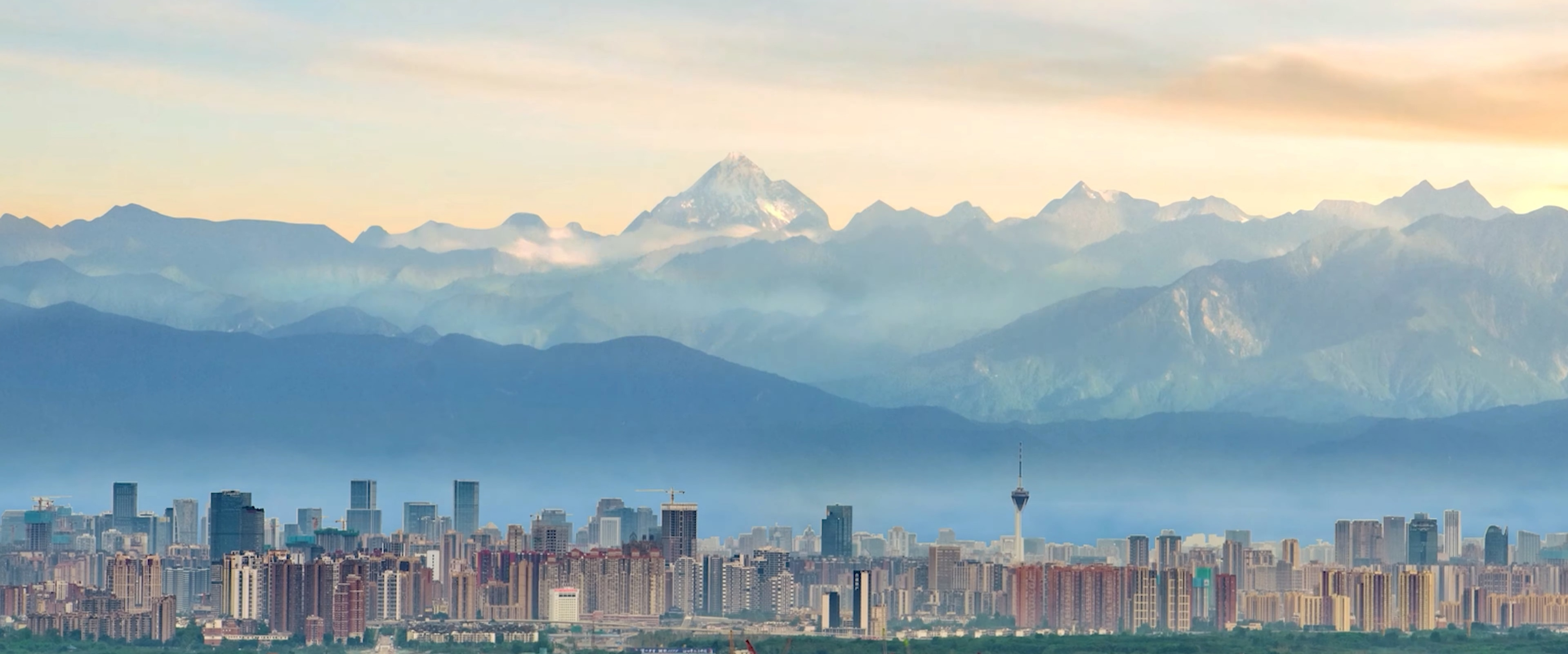
Skyline of Chengdu with Mount Siguniang in the background

This list of tallest buildings in Chengdu ranks skyscrapers in the Chinese city of Chengdu by height. Chengdu is the capital and largest city of the province of Sichuan, with a population of over 20 million. It is a megacity with an urban area population of over 16 million and a major political, cultural, financial and transportation centre in Western China.

Chengdu's earliest skyscrapers were built in the 1990s. The construction of skyscrapers increased sharply during the 2010s, and the rapid rate of construction has continued into the 2020s. As of 2026, Chengdu is home to 127 skyscrapers that reach a height of 150 metres (492 feet) or greater, 42 of which are taller than 200 m (656 ft). Despite this, Chengdu has only the second largest skyline in Western China, behind Chongqing. Chengdu's skyline is more spread out than that of Chongqing; its tallest buildings mainly located in Jiujiang and Tianfu New Area.

Chengdu's tallest building has been the Tiantou International Business Center 1 since 2021, a 284 m, 59-storey office skycsraper. However, the tallest structure is the Tianfu Panda Tower, a communications tower completed in 2004 that reaches 339 m (1,112 ft) tall.

Unlike most major provincial capitals in China, Chengdu currently has no supertall skyscrapers, buildings over 300 m (984 ft) in height. As of 2026, Three are under construction: China Merchants Group West Headquarters, Chengdu Greenland Tower, and Tianfu Center. The latter two have planned heights greater than 400 m (1,312 ft). Tianfu Center is expected to be completed in 2027 and reach a height of 488.9 m (1,604 ft), making it the tallest building in Western China, ahead of Chongqing's International Land and Sea Center.

== Tallest buildings ==
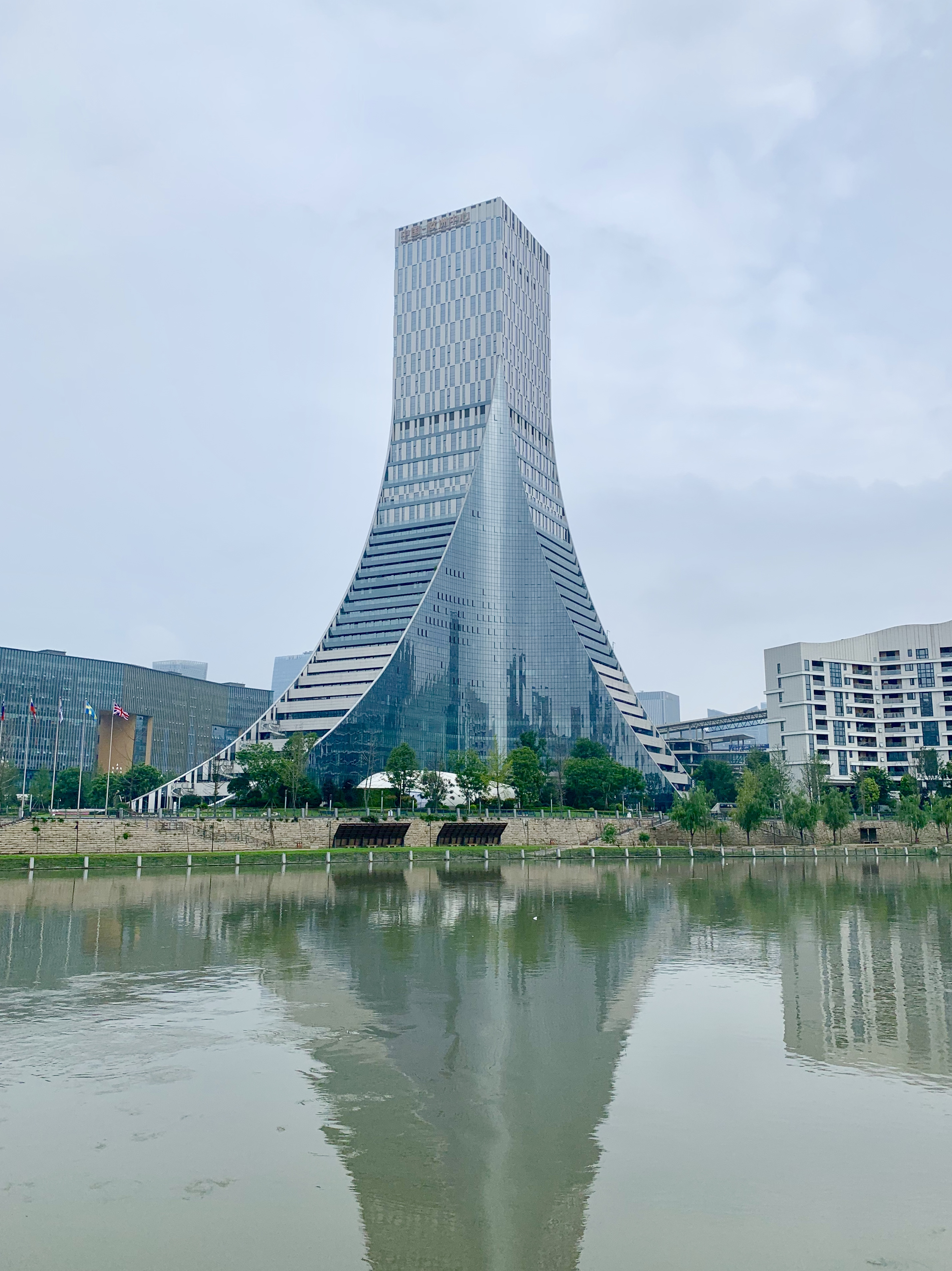
Chengdu Sino-Euro Center

This lists ranks completed skyscrapers in Chengdu that stand at least 200 m (656 ft) tall as of October 2026, based on standard height measurement. This includes spires and architectural details but does not include antenna masts.

| Rank | Building | Height | Floors | Use | Year | Notes |
|---|---|---|---|---|---|---|
| 1 | Tiantou International Business Center 1 | 284 m | 59 | Office | 2021 | |
| 2 | International Commerce Center Tower 1 | 280 m | 60 | Office | 2022 | |
| 3 | La Cadiere Center Block B | 249.6 m | Unknown | Office | 2022 | |
| 4 = | Chengdu International Finance Square Tower 1 | 247 m | 50 | Office | 2014 | |
| 4 = | Chengdu International Finance Square Tower 2 | 247 m | 50 | Office | 2014 | |
| 6 = | Shawan Global Center 1 | 244 m | 61 | Office | 2025 | |
| 6 = | Shawan Global Center 2 | 244 m | 61 | Office | 2025 | |
| 8 | Global Times Center | 243 m | 45 | Office | 2016 | |
| 9 | Western International Finance Center Conrad Hotel | 241 m | 56 | Hotel | 2015 | |
| 10 | Tianfu Innovation Fortune Centre | 232 m | Unknown | Office | 2022 | |
| 11 | La Cadiere Center Block A | 229.2 m | Unknown | Office | 2022 | |
| 12 = | New Hope D10 Tower 1 | 229 m | Unknown | Residential | 2019 | |
| 12 = | New Hope D10 Tower 2 | 229 m | Unknown | Residential | 2019 | |
| 14 = | Tianxi Twin Towers 1 | 222 m | 65 | Residential | 2017 | |
| 14 = | Tianxi Twin Towers 2 | 222 m | 65 | Residential | 2017 | |
| 16 = | Waldorf Astoria Chengdu | 220 m | 51 | Mixed-use | 2017 | |
| 16 = | Tianfu IFC 1 | 220 m | 58 | Office | 2018 | |
| 16 = | Tianfu IFC 2 | 220 m | 58 | Office | 2018 | |
| 16 = | CCCC International Central | 220 m | Unknown | Office | 2019 | |
| 20 = | Oriental Hope Intertek Plaza 1 | 219 m | 45 | Office | 2016 | |
| 20 = | Oriental Hope Intertek Plaza 2 | 219 m | 45 | Office | 2016 | |
| 22 | Jinjiang Cultural and Creative Industry Center Phase I | 217.7 m | 47 | Office | 2023 | |
| 23 | Landmark International Innovation Center Tower 2 | 211 m | 45 | Office | 2023 | |
| 24 = | International Commerce Center Tower 2 | 210 m | 47 | Office | 2022 | |
| 24 = | Fung Tak Chengda Centre | 210 m | 47 | Office | 2019 | |
| 26 | Hexin Center | 208 m | 42 | Office | 2022 | |
| 27 = | OPPO Technology and Research Center | 206 m | 42 | Office | 2023 | |
| 27 = | Minyoun Financial Plaza | 206 m | 47 | Mixed-use | 2012 | |
| 29 | Ascott Qinhuang Chengdu | 205.5 m | 53 | Mixed-use | 2022 | |
| 30 | Lanrun Landmark Plaza Tower 1 | 205.2 m | 43 | Office | 2019 | |
| 31 | China Merchants Magic Cube Tower 4 | 205 m | 43 | Office | 2023 | |
| 32 | China Merchants Magic Cube Tower 5 | 204.7 m | 42 | Office | 2023 | |
| 33 | China Merchants Magic Cube Tower 3 | 204.2 m | 49 | Mixed-use | 2023 | |
| 34 = | Chengdu Fantasia Meinian Plaza, Tower D | 204.1 m | 48 | Office | 2016 | |
| 34 = | Chengdu Fantasia Meinian Plaza, Tower C | 204.1 m | 48 | Office | 2016 | |
| 36 | Sichuan Airlines Center | 204 m | 45 | Office | 2016 | |
| 37 | China Merchants Magic Cube Tower 1 | 202.7 m | 51 | Mixed-use | 2023 | |
| 38 | China Merchants Magic Cube Tower 2 | 202 m | 52 | Mixed-use | 2023 | |
| 39 | Huarun Tower | 201 m | 39 | Office | 2012 | |
| 40 = | Palm Springs International Center Tower 1 | 200 m | 41 | Office | 2013 | |
| 40 = | Pinnacle One | 200 m | 47 | Office | 2015 | |
| 40 = | Twin Rivers International Office Tower A | 200 m | 43 | Office | 2015 | |
| 40 = | Chengdu World Financial Center 1 | 200 m | 46 | Office | 2017 | |
| 40 = | Chengdu World Financial Center 2 | 200 m | 46 | Office | 2017 | |

== Tallest under construction or proposed ==
=== Under construction ===
This lists ranks skyscrapers under construction in Chengdu that are expected to be at least 200 m (656 ft) tall as of 2026, based on standard height measurement. The "Year" column indicates the expected year of completion. Buildings that are on hold are not included.

| Rank | Building | Height | Floors | Use | Year | Notes |
|---|---|---|---|---|---|---|
| 1 | Tianfu Center | 488.9 m | 95 | Office | 2027 | |
| 2 | Chengdu Greenland Tower | 468 m | 101 | Mixed-use | 2029 | |
| 3 | China Merchants Group West Headquarters | 396 m | 82 | Office | 2028 | |
| 4 | La Cadiere Center Block C | 266.5 m | 66 | Mixed-use | 2026 | |
| 5 | Yongli Star City | 260 m | 52 | Office | 2026 | |
| 6 | Qiya International Center | 250 m | 62 | Office | 2028 | |
| 7 | Unicorn Island Tower 1 | 250 m | TBD | Office | 2026 | |
| 8 = | Fosun International Finance Center Tower 1 | 248 m | TBD | Office | TBD (On-hold) | |
| 8 = | Fosun International Finance Center Tower 2 | 248 m | TBD | Office | TBD (On-hold) | |
| 10 = | Chengdu Financial Plaza Tower 1 | 218 m | 53 | Hotel | 2025 | |
| 10 = | JFC Jiaozi Financial Plaza Tower 1 | 218 m | 53 | Mixed-use | 2025 | |
| 12 | JFC Jiaozi Financial Plaza Tower 2 | 205 m | 45 | Office | 2025 | |
| 13 | Chengdu Financial Plaza Tower 2 | 204.5 m | 44 | Office | 2025 | |
| 14 | Chengdu Financial Plaza Tower 3 | 202.3 m | 44 | Office | 2025 | |
| 15 | JFC Jiaozi Financial Plaza Tower 3 | 202 m | 42 | Office | 2025 | |
| 16 | Chengdu Financial Plaza Tower 5 | 200.2 m | 42 | Mixed-use | 2025 | |
| 17 | Beijing Street Office Tower | 200.1 m | 44 | Office | 2025 | |
| 18 = | Shawan Global Center Residential 2 | 200 m | 50 | Residential | 2025 | |
| 18 = | Shawan Global Center Residential 1 | 200 m | 50 | Residential | 2025 | |

=== Proposed ===
This lists ranks proposed skyscrapers in Chengdu that are planned to be at least 200 m (656 ft) tall as of 2026.

| Rank | Building | Height | Floors | Use | Year | Notes |
|---|---|---|---|---|---|---|
| 1 | Tianfu Center Headquarters Tower | 396 m | 82 | Mixed-use | TBD | |
| 2 | Chengdu E-Song Tower | 320 m | TBD | Office | TBD | |
| 3 | New Hope Global Holding Headquarters | 300 m | TBD | Office | TBD | |
| 4 | Jinniu ZhongDingChangeJie Development Office Tower | 250 m | 52 | Office | TBD | |
| 5 | Shimao Royal Hotel | 208.4 m | 43 | Mixed-use | TBD | |
| 6 | Shihao Center Tower 1 | 200 m | TBD | Office | TBD | |
