= Dadonghe Iron Cable Bridge =

Dadonghe Iron Cable Bridge 大东河铁索桥
- Coordinates: 29°17′58″N 107°28′24″E
- Crosses: Dadonghe River
- Locale: Chongqing, China

Characteristics
- Design: China State Construction Engineering
- Width: 12 m
- Traversable?: Yes
- Longest span: 245.5 m (805 ft)
- No. of spans: 1
- Clearance below: 175 m (574 ft)
- No. of lanes: 1
- Capacity: 45 metric ton

History
- Construction start: 2021
- Construction end: 2021
- Construction cost: 2 million RMB
- Opened: 2021

Location
- Interactive map of Dadonghe Iron Cable Bridge

The Dadonghe Iron Cable Bridge (Chinese: 大东河铁索桥), is an iron cable bridge in Chongqing, China. The bridge crosses the Dadonghe River, near by the Shuangbao Grand Bridge. It was built for transport construction material (max 45 tons) over 175m height and 245m span, and it is very popular in social media as paper-thin bridge. This bridge has been closed permanently after Shuangbao Grand Bridge finished.

== See also ==
- List of bridges in China
- List of highest bridges
