= Ping An Building =

Ping An Building may refer to:

- Jiali Plaza in Wuhan
- Ping An Finance Centre in Shenzhen, the fourth tallest building in the world
