= Tianfu International Finance Center =

Skyscraper in Chengdu, China

- 天府国际金融中心

General information
- Status: Completed
- Type: Office
- Architectural style: Modernism
- Location: Chengdu, China, Jiaozi South 1st Road
- Coordinates: 30.58461°N 104.06302°E
- Construction started: 2012
- Completed: 2018

Height
- Roof: 220 m (720 ft)

Technical details
- Structural system: Reinforced concrete
- Floor count: 58
- Floor area: 168,000 m^{2} (1,810,000 sq ft)

Design and construction
- Architect: Paul Andreu
- Developer: China Construction Southwest Institute
- Structural engineer: China State Construction Engineering Corporation

The Tianfu International Finance Center (Chinese: 天府国际金融中心) (also known as the Chengdu Twin Towers (Chinese: 成都金融城双子塔) is an office skyscraper complex in the Jinjiang District of Chengdu, China. Built between 2012 and 2018, the complex consists of two twin towers standing at 220 m (720 ft) tall with 58 floors each which share the position of the 16th tallest building in Chengdu.

== History ==
The complex borders the Fanxiang Avenue to the north (to Shisheng Road), the Yizhou Avenue to the west, a 500-meter greenbelt park to the south, and the Chengren Expressway to the east.

The construction of the complex has been planned since 2004 under the aprobation of the China State Construction Engineering Corporation. The concept of the project was jointly coordinated by French architect Paul Andreu and the China Construction Southwest Institute (CCSI), and has covered an area of 24.7 ha. A core of the city's financial district, the complex was provided with comprehensive supporting facilities, attracting global capital and interest of financial enterprises which are composing the tenancy.

The complex features the world's largest building-integrated LED screen covering the entire shell of both buildings.

== See also ==
- List of tallest buildings in Chengdu
- List of tallest buildings in China
