= Shuangbao Grand Bridge =

Arch bridge in Chongqing, China

Shuangbao Grand Bridge 双堡特大桥
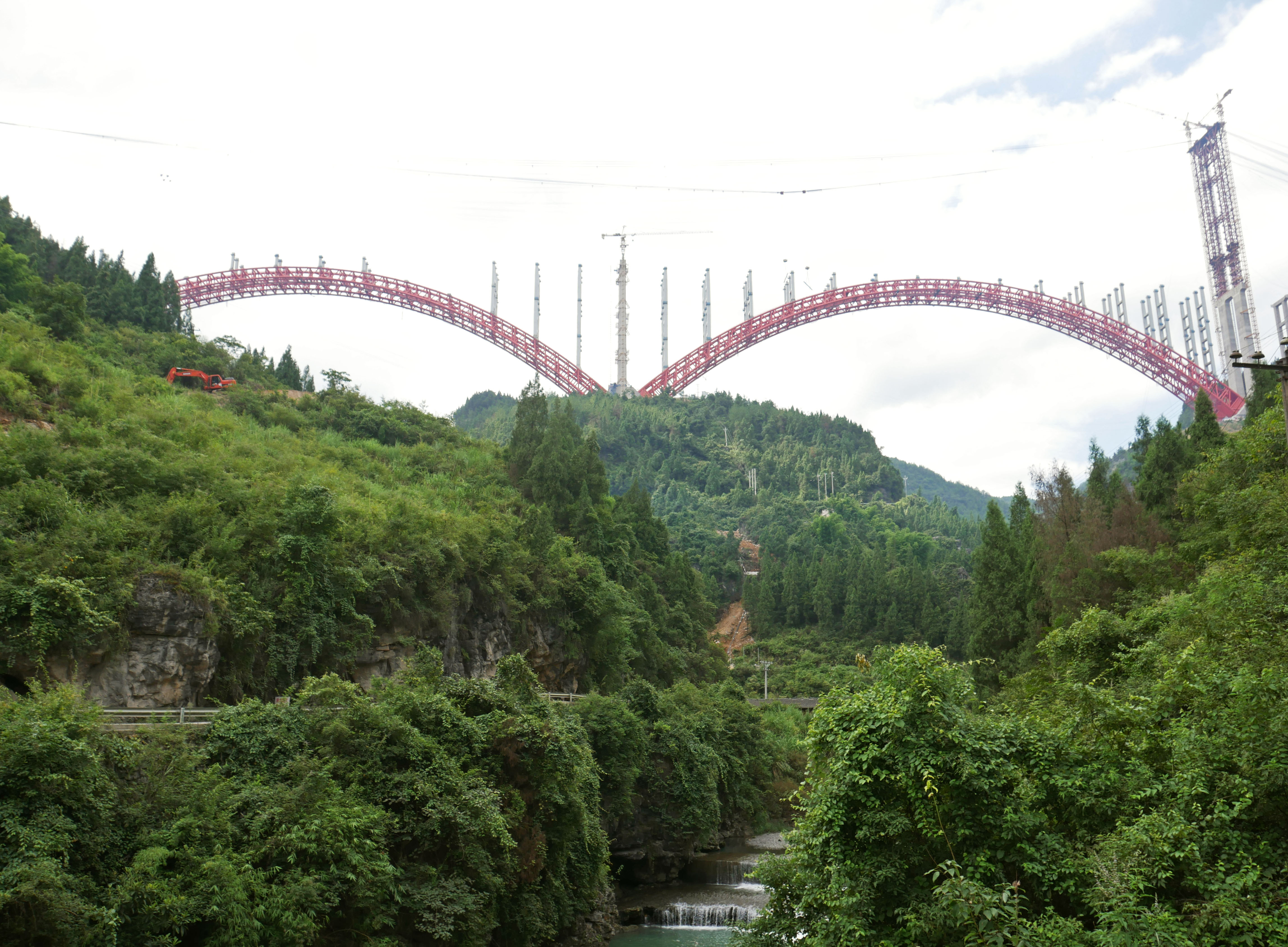
- Coordinates: 29°17′42″N 107°28′26″E
- Carries: Chongqing S549, Shuangbao-Longhua Express
- Crosses: Dadonghe River, Xiaodonghe River
- Locale: Chongqing, China

Characteristics
- Design: China State Construction Engineering
- Total length: 1,620 m (5,315 ft)
- Width: 32 m
- Traversable?: Yes
- Longest span: 2x405 m (1,329 ft)
- No. of spans: 14
- Clearance below: 320 m (1,050 ft)
- No. of lanes: 6

History
- Construction start: 2021
- Construction end: 2024
- Construction cost: 935.6 million RMB
- Opened: 2025

Location
- Interactive map of Shuangbao Grand Bridge

The Shuangbao Grand Bridge (Chinese: 双堡特大桥) is a dual arch bridge in Chongqing, China. The bridge crosses the Dadonghe River and Xiaodonghe River. It is one of the world's highest bridges, measuring 320 metres (1,050 ft) from the bridge deck to the bottom of the gorge. It was awarded the Lindenthal Medal.

== Project ==
Shuangbao Bridge is the core bridge of the S549 line Shuangbao to Longhua underpass reconstruction project (Yanjiang Highway) in Jiangjin District, Chongqing. It was constructed by China State Construction Engineering Sixth Engineering Bureau.

The bridge has a total length of 1,620 metres (5,310 ft), including two arch main span of 405 metres (1,329 ft). The bridge carries the express way connecting Shuangbao District and Longhua Town.

The nearby Dadonghe Iron Cable Bridge built for transport construction material (max 45 tons) is 300m height and 245m span, and it is very popular in social media as paper-thin bridge.

== Construction ==
The construction began in December 2021. In March 2023, the arch was finished. On January 3, 2024, the last T beam was installed. On January 29, 2024, the bridge was opened.

== See also ==
- List of bridges in China
- List of longest arch bridge spans
- List of highest bridges
