= Tianfu Center =

- 天府中心
- Alternative names: Panda Tower

General information
- Status: Under construction
- Type: Office/Exhibition
- Location: Tianfu Avenue South, Chengdu, China
- Coordinates: 30.4315892°N 104.0842757°E
- Construction started: 2022
- Completed: 2027
- Owner: China Overseas Land and Investment

Height
- Height: 489 m (1,604 ft)

Technical details
- Floor count: 95

Design and construction
- Architect: Kohn Pedersen Fox Associates

Tianfu Center (Chinese: 天府中心), locally known as Panda Tower, is a 489-metre (1,604-foot) supertall skyscraper under construction in Tianfu New Area in Chengdu, China. The 95-floor tower was designed by the American architecture firm Kohn Pedersen Fox and upon its completion in 2027, will surpass the stalled Chengdu Greenland Tower as the tallest building in Chengdu along with being the tallest building in Southwestern China.

== History ==
On November 28, 2017, a cluster of land plots in Tianfu New Area was acquired by China Overseas Land and Investment. This included Plot 1, which became the site for Tianfu Center. Originally, the tower was planned to be 677 m (2,221 ft) tall. However, it was later reduced to 489 m (1,604 ft) tall due to a nationwide building height limit order jointly issued by Ministry of Housing and Urban-Rural Development and National Development and Reform Commission in April 2020, which restricted new buildings' construction height to 500 m (1,640 ft).

Construction of Tianfu Center officially began on August 12, 2021. On December 19, 2022, Sichuan Economic Network reported that concrete pouring on the building's base plate was completed. The tower's underground floors were then capped on June 17, 2023. In June 2024, Tianfu Release reported that the building's core construction has reached the 16th floor with a height of 80 m (260 ft).

== See also ==
- List of tallest buildings in Chengdu
- List of tallest buildings in China by city
