= China Overseas Land and Investment =

Hong Kong-based real estate conglomerate

China Overseas Land and Investment Limited
- Company type: listed company
- Traded as: SEHK: 688; Hang Seng Index component
- Industry: Real estate
- Founded: 1979
- Headquarters: Hong Kong, China
- Area served: mainland China, Hong Kong
- Key people: Chairman: Mr. Kong Qingping
- Owner: China Overseas Holdings (55.99%)
- Parent: China State Construction Engineering Corporation Limited (via China Overseas Holdings)

Chinese name
- Traditional Chinese: 中國海外發展有限公司
- Simplified Chinese: 中国海外发展有限公司
Transcriptions
- Website: www.coli.com.hk

China Overseas Land and Investment Limited (COLI), known as China Overseas, is a Hong Kong–based and incorporated real estate conglomerate. It is an indirect subsidiary of China State Construction Engineering Corporation Limited.

Found in June 1979, it is engaged in construction and contracting, property development and infrastructure investment, with operations currently in Hong Kong, Macau and Mainland China.

China Overseas was listed in the Stock Exchange of Hong Kong as a red chip stock in August 1992.

In July 2005, it spun off its construction business and formed China State Construction International Holdings Limited ("CSCI"), which was listed on the Stock Exchange of Hong Kong.

On 10 December 2007, it was selected to be a Hang Seng Index Constituent Stock (blue chip).

== Business areas ==
China Overseas Land and Investment operates in four segments: property development, which is engaged in the development and sales of properties; property investment, which is engaged in property letting; infrastructure, which is engaged in the investments in entities undertaking toll highways, and other operations, which is engaged in property management, property agency, logistics operations, building design consultancy services, supply of heat and electricity and securities trading.

China Overseas Land and Investment's property development, property investment and other activities are carried out in Hong Kong, Macau and regions in the People's Republic of China other than Hong Kong and Macau. All infrastructure project investments are located in the People's Republic of China. On November 28, 2008, the Company disposed Value Idea Investments Limited.

== Shareholders ==
The direct parent company of China Overseas Land and Investment is China Overseas Holdings Limited, which sometimes known as China Overseas group (simplified Chinese: 中海集团; traditional Chinese: 中海集團). China Overseas Holdings is owned by China State Construction Engineering Corporation Limited (CSCECL). CSCECL itself is a listed company. The ultimate parent company, China State Construction Engineering Corporation, is a Chinese Central Government owned company.

== See also ==
- Real estate in China
- Glorious Property Holdings
- China Resources Land
