= Liaoning Television =

Chinese telecommunications company

Liaoning Radio and Television (LRTV) 辽宁广播电视台
- Type: Radio and television, Satellite television and Cable television
- Industry: Television broadcasting
- Founded: December 18, 2009
- Headquarters: Shenyang, Liaoning, China
- Products: Television content, Television programming
- Website: www.lntv.com.cn

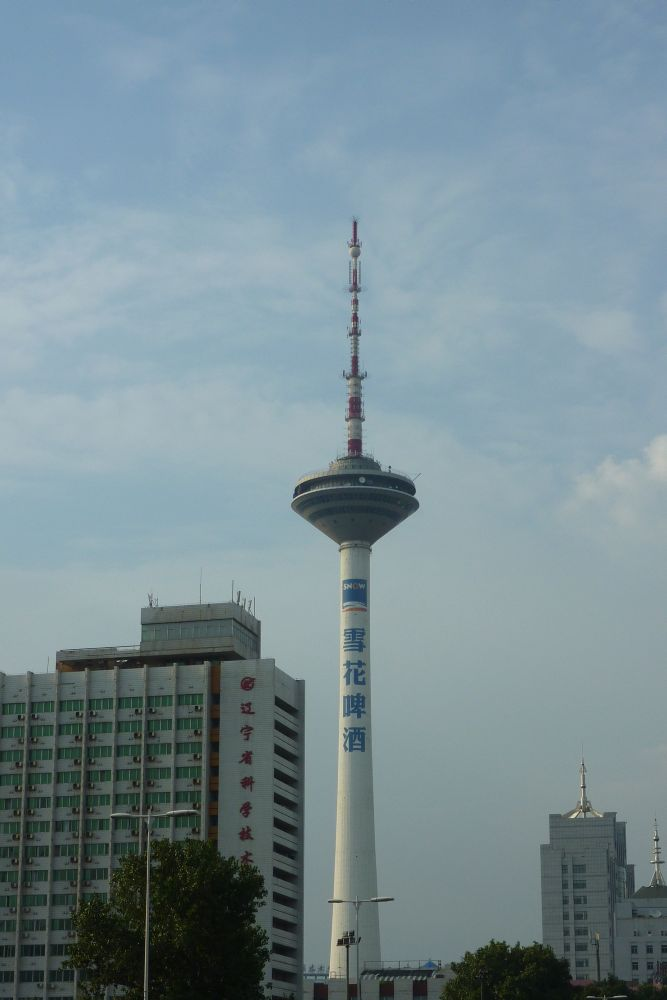
Liaoning Broadcast and TV Tower, Shenyang

Liaoning Radio and Television or LRTV is a telecommunications company based in Shenyang, Liaoning province, China.

Originating from the Harbin-based Manchurian Telecommunications Company, Liaoning Radio started operations in 1946, as Xinhua Northeast. The television station was launched on October 1, 1959, being one of the earliest launched television stations in the People's Republic of China. Its first name was Shenyang TV, being renamed as Liaoning TV on July 1, 1979.

LRTV now has 6 radio channels and 8 TV channels for the public and 5 pay TV channels for all the viewers in China. LRTV broadcasts only in Mandarin (usually with Chinese subtitles, and occasionally English as well for some features, such as The Ultimate Fighter: China). LRTV's TV and radio broadcasts can be streamed for free online on their main website and app.

== LRTV's radio channels ==
- Comprehensive Radio (Voice of Liaoning)
- Economic Radio
- Classic Music Radio
- Traffic Radio
- Rural Radio
- Information Radio

== LRTV's TV channels ==
- Liaoning Satellite Television (General Channel)
- City Channel
- Movie & TV series Channel
- Life Channel
- Sports Channel
- Education & Youth Channel
- North Channel
- Yijia Shopping Channel
- Economic Channel
- Public Channel
- Mobile TV Channel (only air on buses in Shenyang)
- Game Play Channel (pay channel)
- E-Sports Channel (pay channel)
- Internet Chess & Poker Channel (pay channel)
- Home Money Management Channel (pay channel)
- New Cartoon Channel (pay channel)

== See also ==
- Television in the People's Republic of China
