= Shun Hing Square =

Supertall skyscraper in Shenzhen, Guangdong, China

- 信兴广场
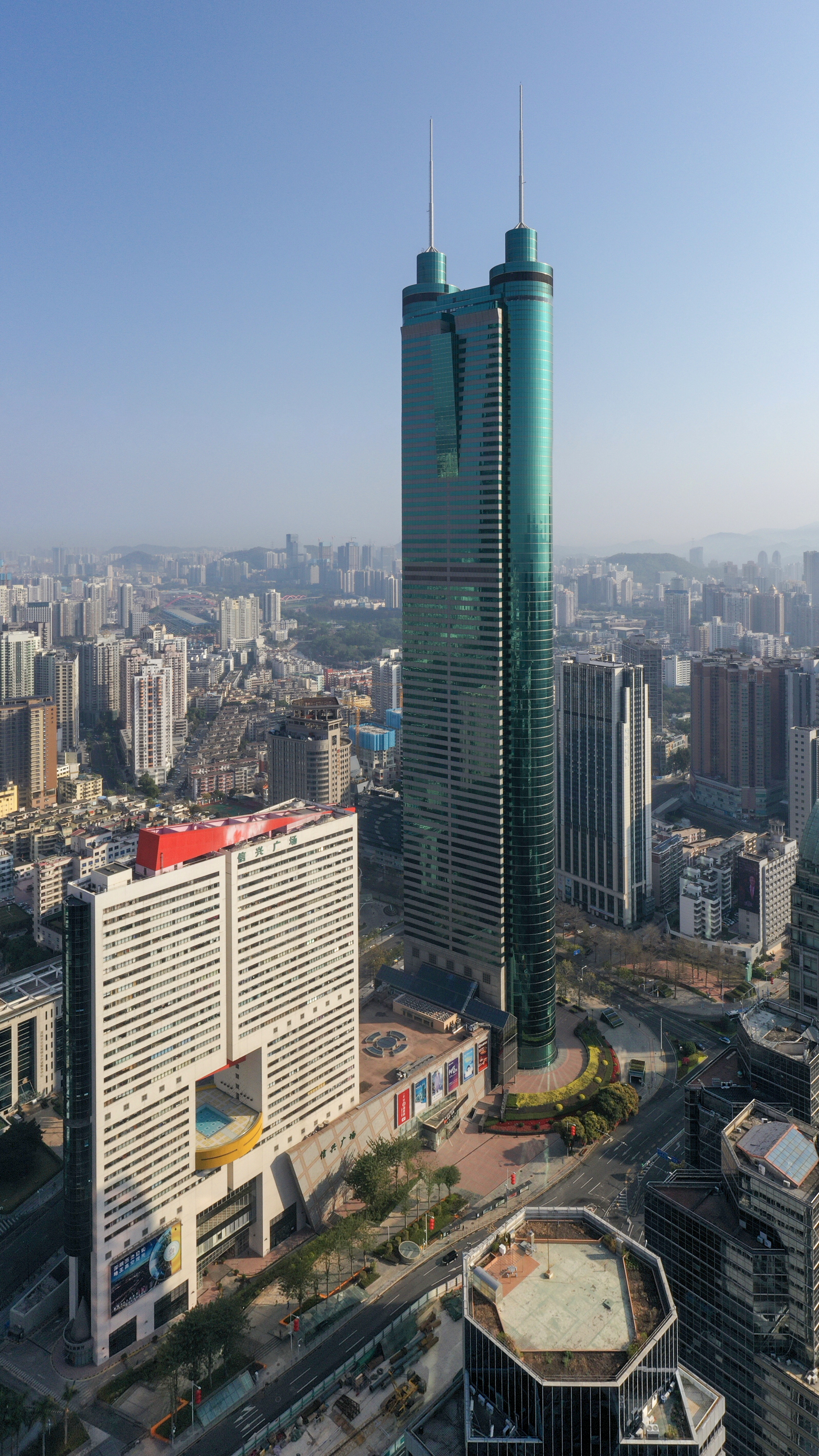
- Shun Hing Square in February 2021
- Interactive map of the Shun Hing Square area

General information
- Status: Completed
- Type: Office & retail
- Location: 5002 Shennan East Road, Luohu District, Shenzhen, Guangdong, China
- Coordinates: 22°32′43″N 114°06′21″E
- Construction started: April 21, 1993; 33 years ago
- Completed: March 9, 1996; 30 years ago
- Opening: June 27, 1996; 30 years ago
- Owner: Kumagai Gumi Company

Height
- Architectural: 384 m (1,260 ft)
- Roof: 325 m (1,066 ft)
- Top floor: 298 m (978 ft)
- Observatory: 298 m (978 ft)

Technical details
- Floor count: 69 (+3 basement floors)
- Floor area: 280,000 m^{2} (3,000,000 sq ft)
- Lifts/elevators: 36

Design and construction
- Architect: K.Y. Cheung Design Associates
- Developer: Shun Hing Group
- Structural engineer: Maunsell AECOM Group

Shun Hing Square
- Simplified Chinese: 信兴广场
- Traditional Chinese: 信興廣場
- Cantonese Yale: Seunhīng gwóngchèuhng
Transcriptions
Standard Mandarin
- Hanyu Pinyin: Xìnxīng guǎngchǎng
- Wade–Giles: Hsin^{4}-hsing^{1} kuang^{3}-ch‘ang^{3}
- IPA: [ɕîn.ɕíŋ kwǎŋ.ʈʂʰàŋ]
Yue: Cantonese
- Yale Romanization: Seunhīng gwóngchèuhng
- Jyutping: seon3 hing1 gwong2 coeng4
- IPA: [sɵn˧.hɪŋ˥ kʷɔŋ˧˥.tsʰœŋ˩]

Shun Hing Square (Chinese: 信兴广场), also known as "Di Wang Tower" (地王大厦) is a 384-meter (1,260 ft)-tall skyscraper in Shenzhen, Guangdong province, China. Upon its completion in 1996, it became the tallest building in China, until being surpassed by CITIC Plaza in the next year.

== Background ==
The building was built at a pace of four floors in nine days. The main tower contains office space, a car park and a 5-story shopping arcade complex with four sets of escalators, five passenger elevators and two service elevators, and a floor area ranging from 3450 m^{2} to 4900 m^{2}. On the top floor (69th floor) is the "Meridian View Center," an observation deck.

Its common nickname, "Diwang Building", derives from the auction price for the piece of land it stands being the most expensive in Shenzhen at the time. 24,500 tonnes of steel were used in construction.

== Records held ==
As of October 2025, the building is

- The seventh tallest in Shenzhen
- 29th tallest building in mainland China
- 55th tallest in the world
- The third tallest building in the world with fewer than 70 floors
- The tallest all-steel building in China.
- The tallest building in China from 1996 to the completion of CITIC Plaza in Guangzhou in 1997.
- The first skyscraper in China to be one of the ten tallest in the world (Bank of China Tower and Central Plaza, of Hong Kong, were constructed and topped out while Hong Kong was still under British sovereignty).
- The first in China to reach 1,150 ft (350 m).
- Tallest building constructed in Shenzhen in the 1990s.
- Tallest building in Shenzhen from 1996 to September 2011 until surpassed by the nearby 441.8-metre-tall (1,449 ft) Kingkey 100.

== Image gallery ==
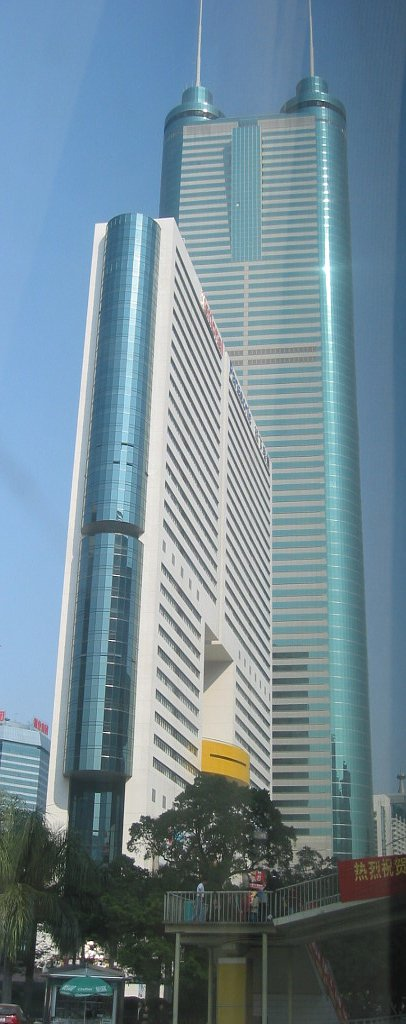
Shun Hing Square with the annex shown in front

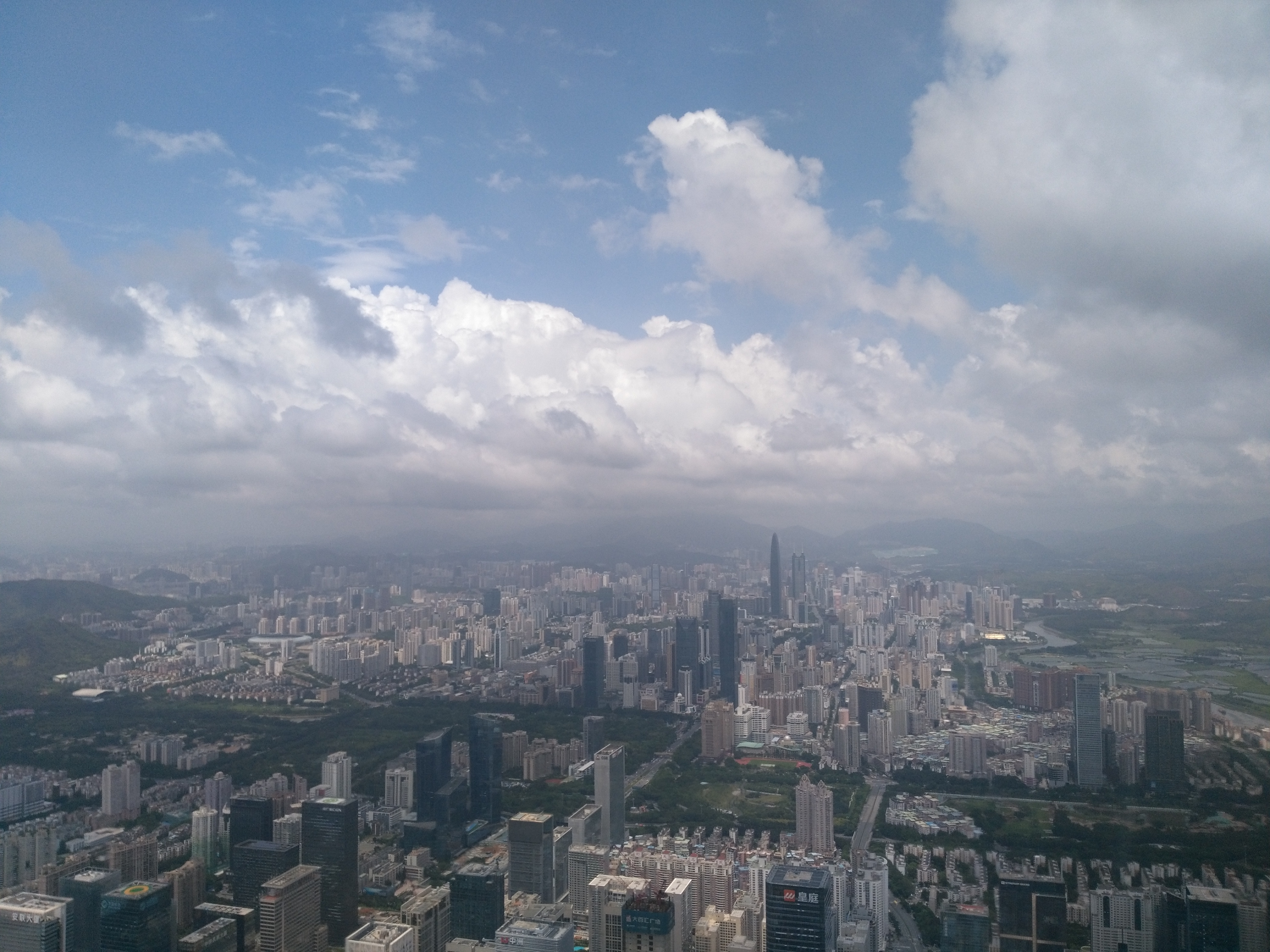
Shun Hing Square as shown from the Ping An Finance Center

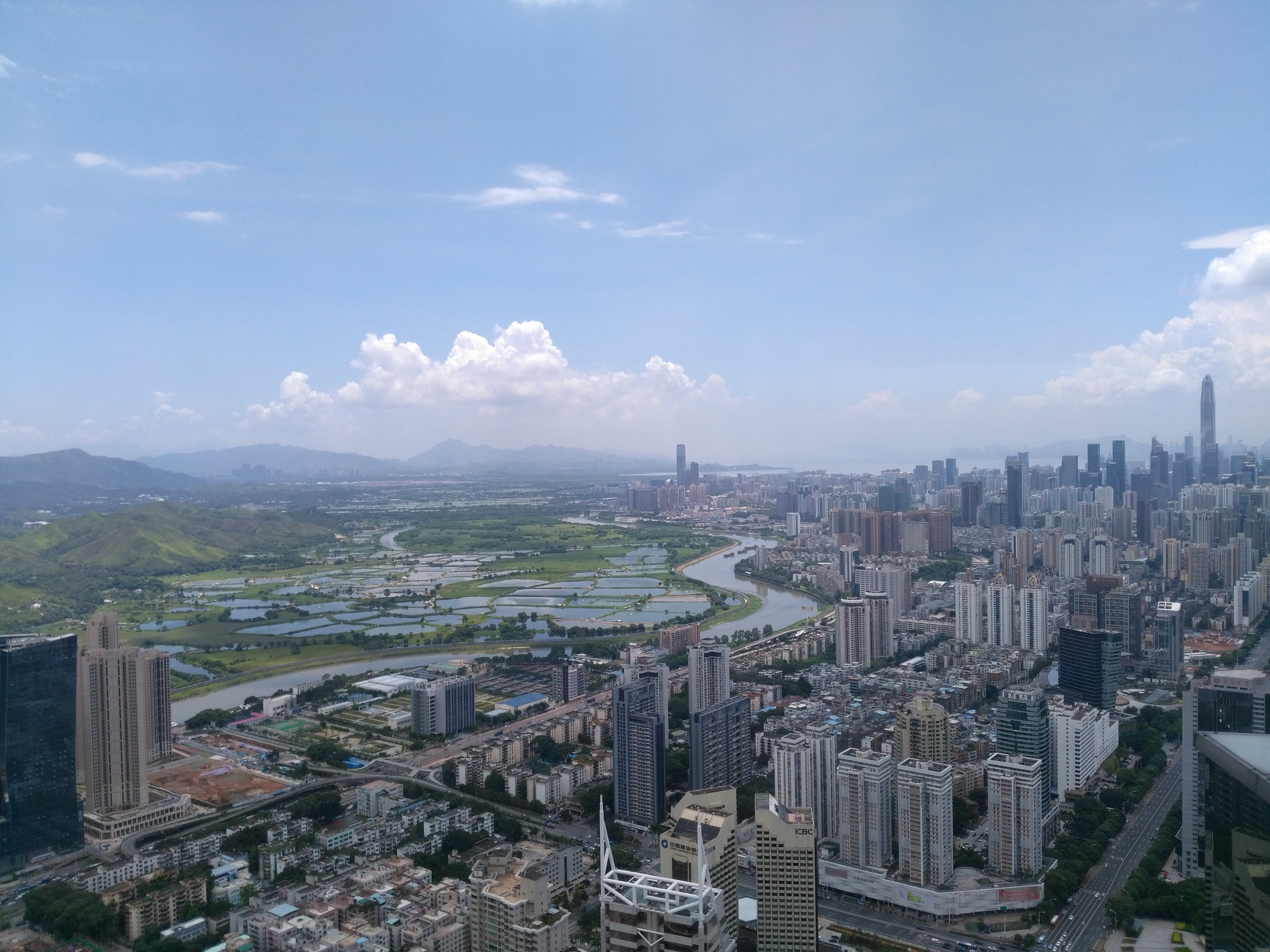
Seeing from the top of Shun Hing Square

== See also ==
- List of tallest buildings in Shenzhen
- List of tallest structures in China
- List of tallest buildings in the world
