= Tianfu Panda Tower =

Tower in Chengdu, Sichuan, China

- 天府熊猫塔
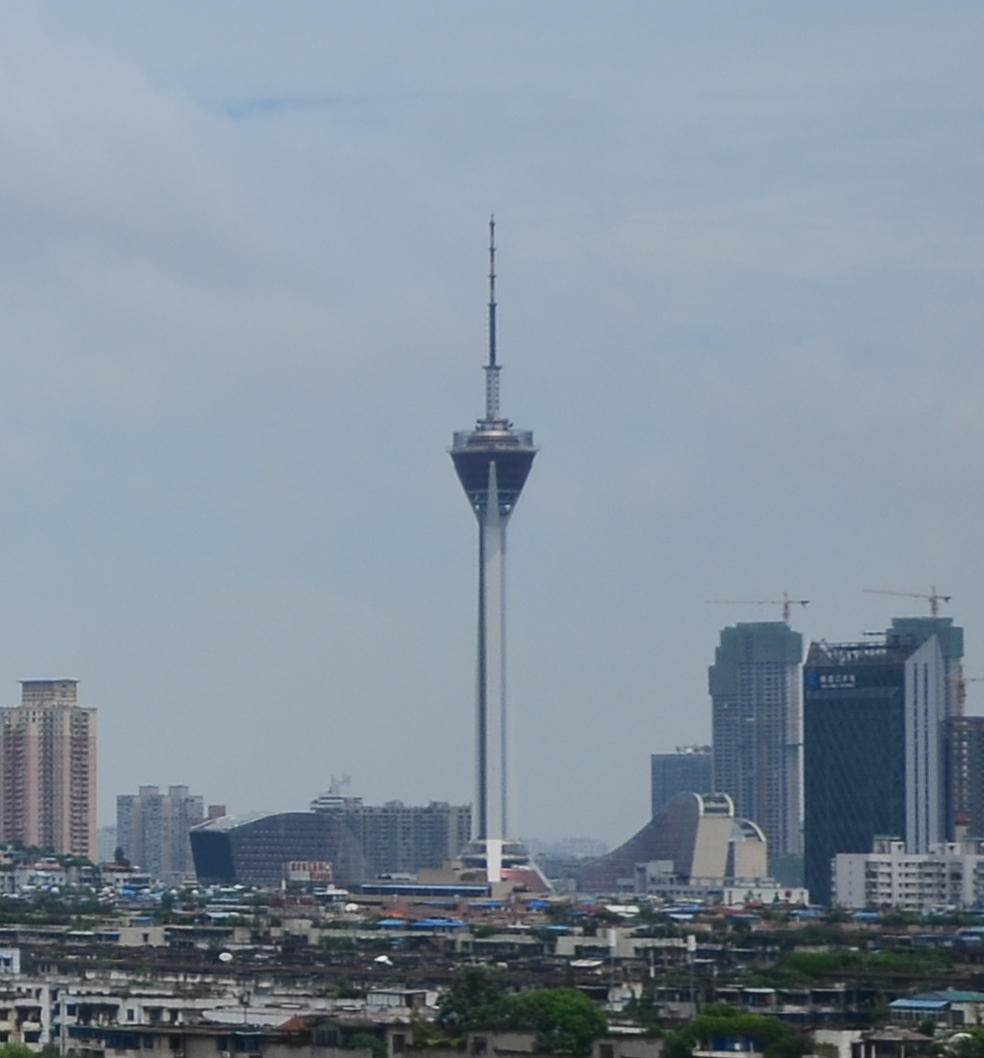
- The tower in 2013

General information
- Status: Completed
- Type: Television tower
- Location: Chengdu, Sichuan, China
- Coordinates: 30°39′52.55″N 104°5′32″E
- Construction started: 1992 (restarted in 1998)
- Completed: 2006; 20 years ago
- Opening: October 17, 2006; 20 years ago

Height
- Antenna spire: 339 m (1,112 ft)
- Roof: 257 m (843 ft)
- Top floor: 230 m (755 ft)

Technical details
- Floor count: 17
- Lifts/elevators: 7

Tianfu Panda Tower (Chinese: 天府熊猫塔), also known as the 339 TV Tower, is a 339-meter (1,112 ft) radio and television tower in Chenghua, Chengdu, Sichuan, China. It stands at 168 Mengzhuiwan Street, by the Jin River. The tower serves as a broadcasting transmission hub for Sichuan and is one of the most prominent landmarks on Chengdu's skyline. It is the tallest tower in western China.

In addition to telecommunications, the tower contains observation areas, dining facilities, and spaces used for tourism and cultural activities. The surrounding 339 area has developed into a concentration of restaurants, bars, entertainment venues, and commercial facilities.

== History ==
The tower was completed in 2006 as the Sichuan Radio and Television Tower (四川广播电视塔). Contemporary reports described it as occupying about 10 mu, approximately 0.67 ha (1.7 acres), and reaching a total height of 339 meters.

The tower's tourism facilities opened to the public on September 15, 2013, as part of the Sichuan Radio and Television Cultural Plaza development. The initial attractions included an indoor observation level at 208 meters and an outdoor observation level at 218 meters. The development also included a panoramic elevator and plans for restaurants at 204 and 213 meters.

By 2015, the tower was renamed Jinxiu Tianfu Tower (锦绣天府塔). Its tourist facilities included a glass observation platform and a rotating restaurant offering panoramic views of Chengdu. The tower was again renamed Tianfu Panda Tower (天府熊猫塔) on 9 February 2018.

The tower was unofficially referred to as "West Pearl Tower" in some English-language skyscraper databases.

== Design and use ==
The Tianfu Panda Tower consists of five principal structural sections: a base, a lower tower building, the main shaft, an upper tower building, and an antenna mast. About 8,000 m^{2} (86,000 sq ft) of space within the tower is used for tourism, dining, entertainment, art exhibitions, observation facilities, and related activities.

The principal observation facilities are in the upper portion of the tower. The indoor observation level is at 208 meters, while the outdoor platform is at 218 meters. A rotating restaurant was subsequently operated in the upper tower and provides a 360-degree view of the city.

Its primary technical function is radio and television transmission. Sichuan's provincial gazetteer describes the tower as a hub for the province's radio and television transmission system. The structure also carries extensive exterior lighting and has been used for light shows and other large-scale visual displays during public celebrations.

The tower has become a landmark of Chengdu's skyline. The tower is used as a large-scale urban lighting installation. Displays have incorporated images associated with Chengdu and Sichuan, including the giant panda, the Golden Sun Bird, the hibiscus, and elements of Sichuan opera. Chengdu municipal government report included the Tianfu Panda Tower among notable city landmarks and scenic sights.

== See also ==
- List of tallest towers
- List of tallest structures in China
