= Liaoning Broadcast and TV Tower =

Communication tower in Shenyang, China

Coordinates: 41.780417°N 123.427972°E

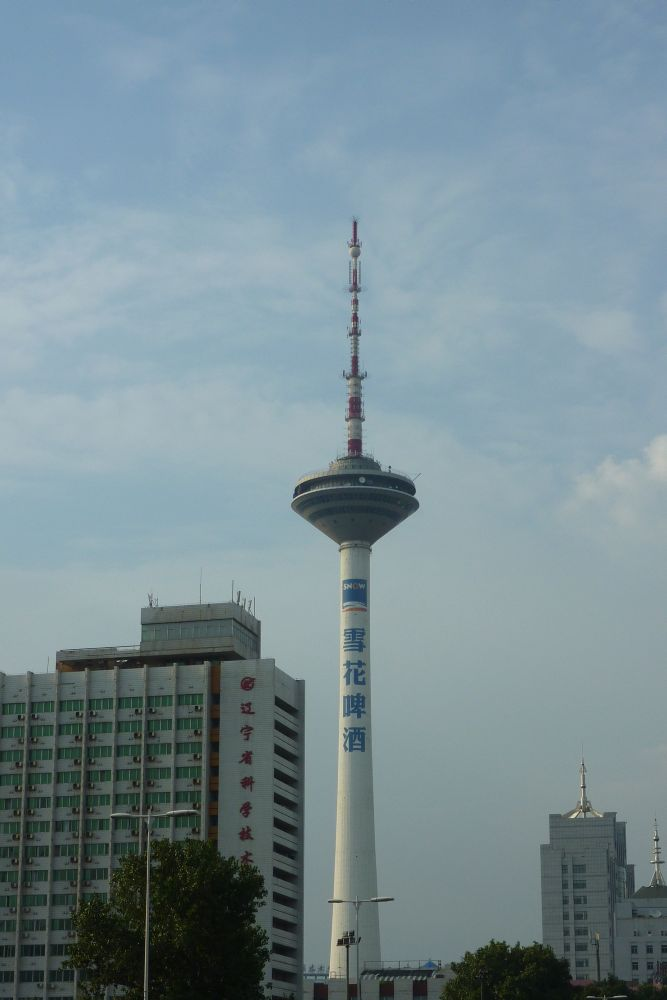
Liaoning Broadcast and TV Tower

The Liaoning Broadcast and Television Tower (Chinese: 辽宁广播电视塔; pinyin: Liáoníng guǎngbō diànshì tǎ) is a tall free-standing structure used for communication. It was built in 1989 in Shenyang, China and is 305.5 metres (1,002 ft) tall. Within the "disk" of the tower, accessible through an elevator, there is an indoor observation deck, a rotating restaurant, and a small bar. On the top of the disk is an outdoor observation deck. This tower is in the World Federation of Great Towers.

== See also ==
- Liaoning Television
- List of towers
