= Jiangsu Nanjing Broadcast Television Tower =

Communication tower in Nanjing, China

Coordinates: 32°4′3.84″N 118°44′42.40″E

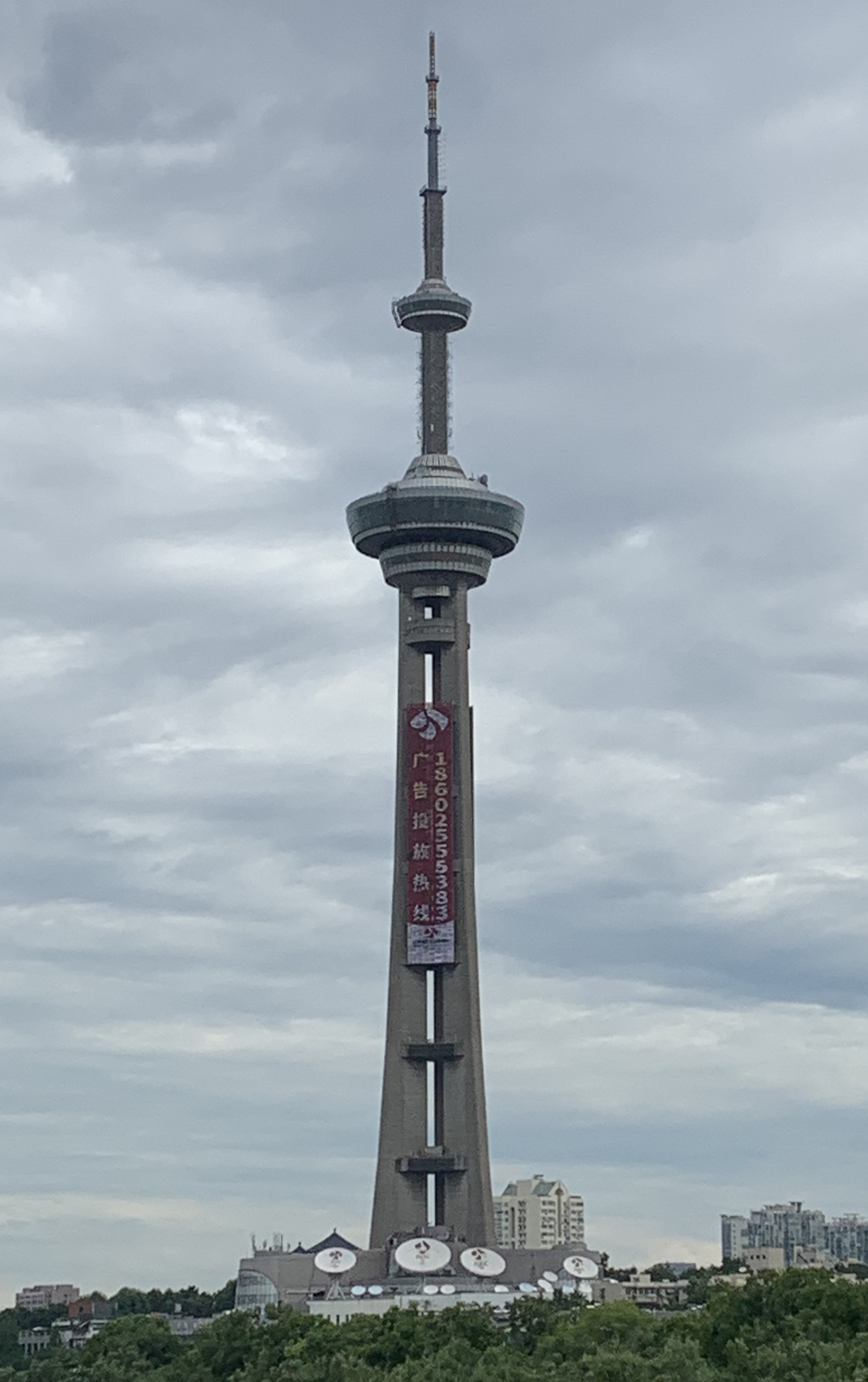
Jiangsu Nanjing Broadcast Television Tower in 2024

The Nanjing Broadcast Television Tower (Chinese: 江苏南京广播电视塔) in Jiangsu Province is a free-standing telecommunications and observation tower whose antenna reaches up to 318.5 metres (1045 feet). It was built in 1996 in Nanjing, China.

== See also ==
- List of towers
