= IAP Meteorological Tower =

The IAP Meteorological Tower is a 325-metre-tall (1,066 ft) guyed tower for meteorological measurements, studies of air pollution and studies of the atmospheric boundary layer in Beijing, China. It is one of the tallest of its kind in the world and was at time of completion in August 1979 the tallest man-made structure in China. Its basement is situated 49 metres (161 ft) above sea level. The Tower carries a webcam at 280 metres (920 ft).
