= Daqing Radio and Television Tower =

1989 telecommunications tower in China

Coordinates: 46°35′51″N 125°4′51″E

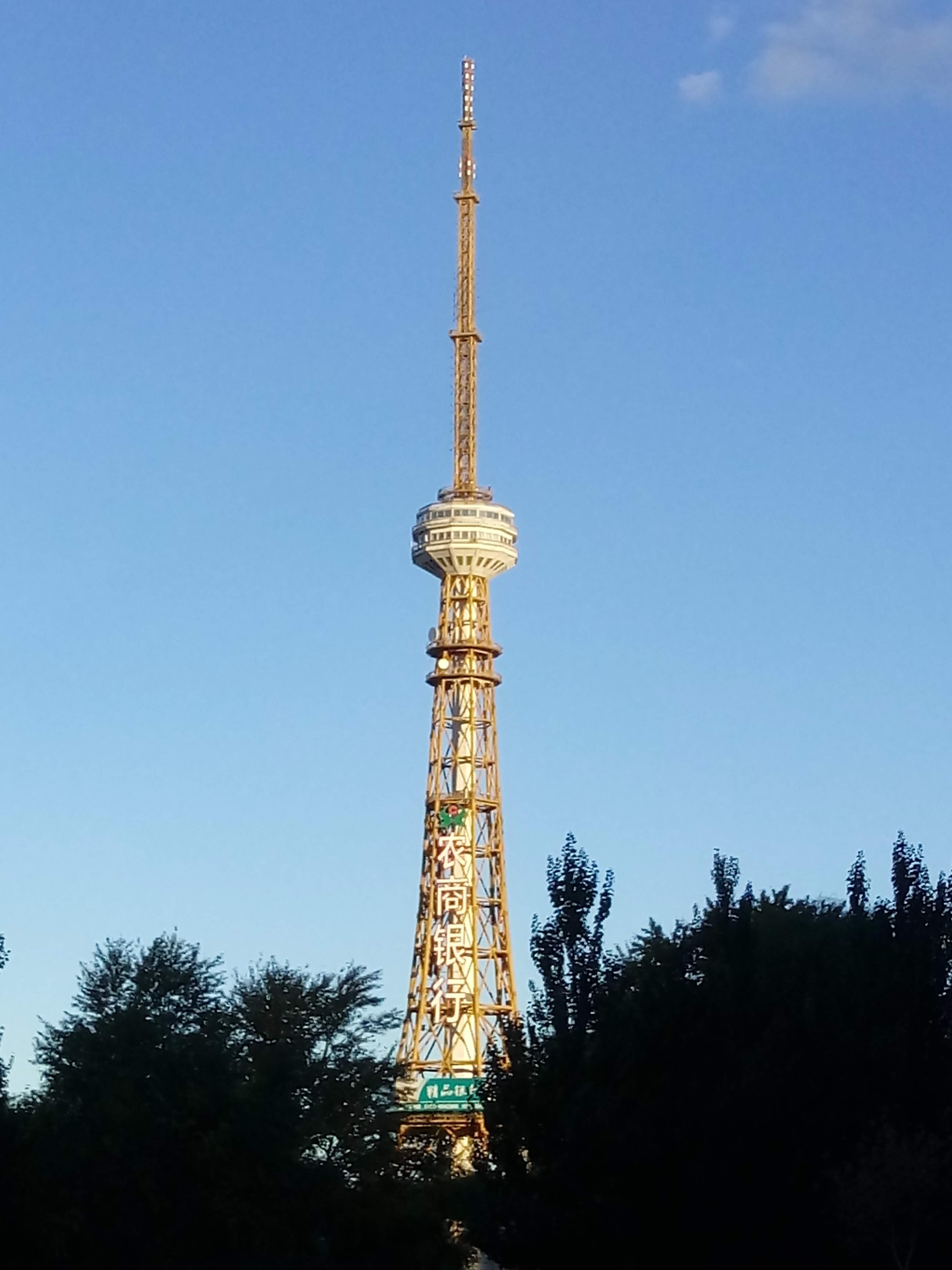
Daqing Radio and Television Tower

Daqing Radio and Television Tower (simplified Chinese: 大庆广播电视塔; traditional Chinese: 大慶廣播電視塔; pinyin: Dàqìng Guǎngbō Diànshìtǎ) is a free standing telecommunications tower built in 1989 in Daqing, China. The tower is 260 m (853 ft) tall.

== See also ==
- Lattice tower
- List of towers
