= China State Construction International Holdings =

Hong Kong construction contractor

China State Construction International Holdings Limited 中國建築國際集團有限公司
- Type: State-owned enterprise Hong Kong–based subsidiary
- Industry: Construction
- Founded: 1979
- Headquarters: Hong Kong, People's Republic of China
- Area served: People's Republic of China, Hong Kong
- Key people: Chairman: Mr. Kong Qingping
- Products: Road, bridges, railways and others
- Parent: State Construction Engineering (Hong Kong) Limited; China Overseas Land and Investment Limited
- Website: China State Construction International Holdings Limited

China State Construction International Holdings Limited ("China State Construction" in short form) (SEHK: 3311) is the largest construction contractor in Hong Kong, mostly from the projects in the government, public organisations and large private corporations. It is operated mainly under the subsidiaries of China State Construction Engineering (Hong Kong) Limited and China Overseas (Hong Kong) Limited currently.

It started its construction business in Hong Kong since 1979. It engages in building construction and civil engineering operations as well as other peripheral operations such as foundation work, site investigation, mechanical and electrical engineering, highway and bridge construction, concrete and pre-cast production.

It was listed in the Hong Kong Stock Exchange in July 2005.

== Business areas ==
China State Construction operates in four segments: construction activities; generation and supply of heat and electricity; provision of connection services, and other activities. The other business includes the insurance business, project consultancy services, and the sales of building materials and pre-cast structure.

China State Construction principally operates in five geographical segments: Hong Kong, Regions in the People's Republic of China other than Hong Kong and Macau, Macau, United Arab Emirates and India. Its major subsidiaries include China Overseas Insurance Limited, China Overseas Insurance Services Limited, China State Construction Engineering (Hong Kong) Limited, Classicman International Limited, Xun An Engineering Company Limited and Zetson Enterprises Ltd.
