= Kaifeng TV Tower =

Coordinates: 34°48′32″N 114°18′50″E

Kaifeng TV Tower is a free standing telecommunications tower in Kaifeng, China which was completed in 1995. The tower stands 268 metres (879 ft) and features a revolving restaurant.

== See also ==
- List of towers
- Lattice tower
