= Glorious Property Holdings =

Glorious Property Holdings Limited 恒盛地产控股有限公司
- Type: Publicly traded company
- Industry: Real estate
- Founded: 2007
- Headquarters: Shanghai, People's Republic of China
- Area served: People's Republic of China
- Key people: Chairman: Zhang Zhi-Rong
- Website: Glorious Property Holdings Limited

Glorious Property Holdings Limited (Chinese: 恒盛地产) (SEHK: 845) is a Shanghai-based property developer, established in 1996. It has a land bank of 13.6 square kilometers in cities like Shanghai, Beijing and Tianjin.

Glorious Property was incorporated in the Cayman Islands in July 2007 and develops property mostly in China. Projects include Sunshine Holiday in Tianjin and Shanghai Bay, situated along the Huangpu River. Its first property was the Sunshine Greenland hotel in Shanghai in 1996.

The company as of July 2009 had 19 projects in various stages of development (seven of them in Shanghai) with a total land bank of around 13.6 square kilometers.

Zhang Zhi Rong, founder, chairman and controlling shareholder, has more than 13 years experience in the industry, and before that was involved in construction materials trading and sub-contracting.

== IPO ==
In September 2009, it is seeking a Hong Kong Stock Exchange initial public offering of US$1.53 billion. Glorious Property is due to list on the Hong Kong stock exchange on October 2.

Glorious Property is seeking to sell 2.25 billion shares at a price range of four Hong Kong dollars to HK$5.30 (52 U.S. cents to 68 U.S. cents) each, translating to a forward price/book multiple of 9.5 to 12.4 times. The company also has an option to increase the deal size by 15% to raise a total of US$1.76 billion. Four cornerstone investors have already been guaranteed US$130 million worth of shares, including Sino-Ocean Land Holdings Ltd., Shanghai Industrial Holdings Ltd., China Southern Fund Management Co. and a private company under Hong Kong conglomerate Nam Fung Group.

== Affiliates/SEC action ==
Zhang also reportedly controls:

- Well Advantage Ltd.
- a company that has a "strategic cooperation agreement" with Chinese oil company CNOOC

These two affiliates gained attention in July 2012 when the US SEC got a court order to freeze assets in an insider trading case involving $13 million in gains on shares of Nexen, a Canadian oil company for which CNOOC had recently announced a tender offer.

Zhang co-founded China Rongsheng Heavy Industries Group, China's biggest non-state-owned shipbuilder by order book in 2012, in 2005. Rongsheng Heavy signed a strategic-cooperation agreement with Cnooc in 2010 and delivered "a 3,000-meter deepwater pipe-laying-crane vessel" in 2011. Zhang, "43 years old and ranked 22nd on Forbes's China wealth list" with a net worth of about $2.6 billion in 2011, was not accused of any wrongdoing in the SEC complaint.

Settlements were negotiated with the SEC:

In October 2012, the SEC announced a settlement with the lead defendant, Well Advantage, which agreed to pay more than $14.2 million to settle the insider trading charges. ... [I]n March 2013, ... a Hong Kong–based broker, her husband, and her brokerage clients agreed to pay more than $3.3 million to settle the SEC's claims. ... [In May 2013, a] Singapore resident ... [reached agreement for] disgorgement of her ill-gotten gains of $466,477.62 and a penalty of $100,000 ... [and] permanently enjoining her from future violations.

== See also ==
- Real estate in China
