= Jiali Plaza =

Skyscraper in Wuhan, China

Coordinates: 30°34′52.1″N 114°17′9.3″E

Jiali Building
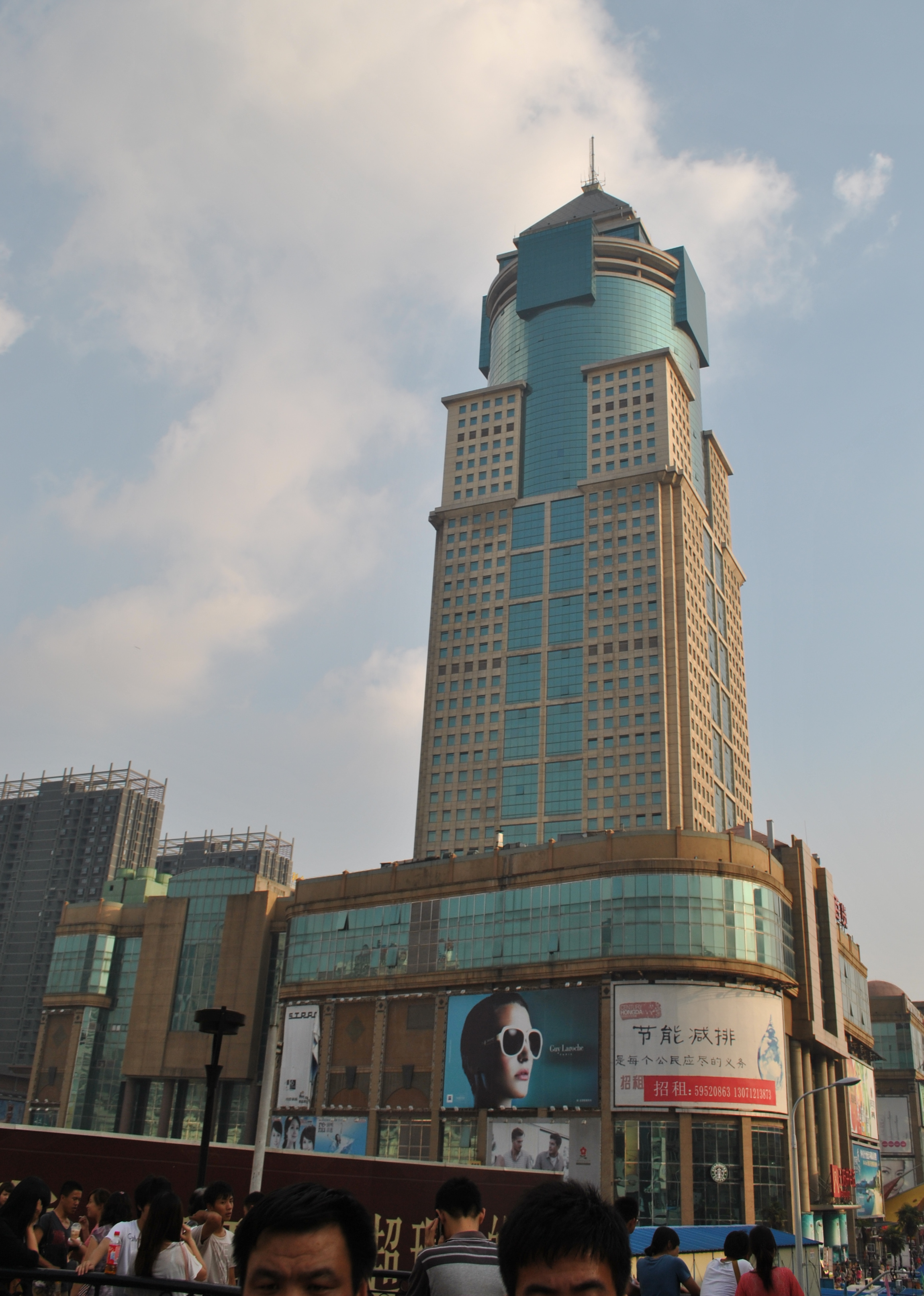
- Jiali Building / Plaza in Wuhan
- Interactive map of the Jiali Building area
- Alternative names: Ping An Building

General information
- Status: Completed
- Location: Wuhan, China
- Completed: 1997

Height
- Height: 823 ft (251 m)

Technical details
- Floor count: 57 (+2 below-grade)
- Floor area: 2,060,212 sq ft (191,400.0 m^{2})

Design and construction
- Architect: WMKY Limited

Jiali Plaza (simplified Chinese: 佳丽广场; traditional Chinese: 佳麗廣場; pinyin: Jiālì Guǎngchǎng), also known as Ping An Building, is a 251-metre (823 ft) tall skyscraper located in Wuhan, China. The 61 storey building was completed in 1997 under the design by WMKY Lim. The building has two underground floors which are used as a car park.

== See also ==
- List of skyscrapers
