= Chengdu Greenland Tower =

Building in Chengdu, China

- 成都绿地中心
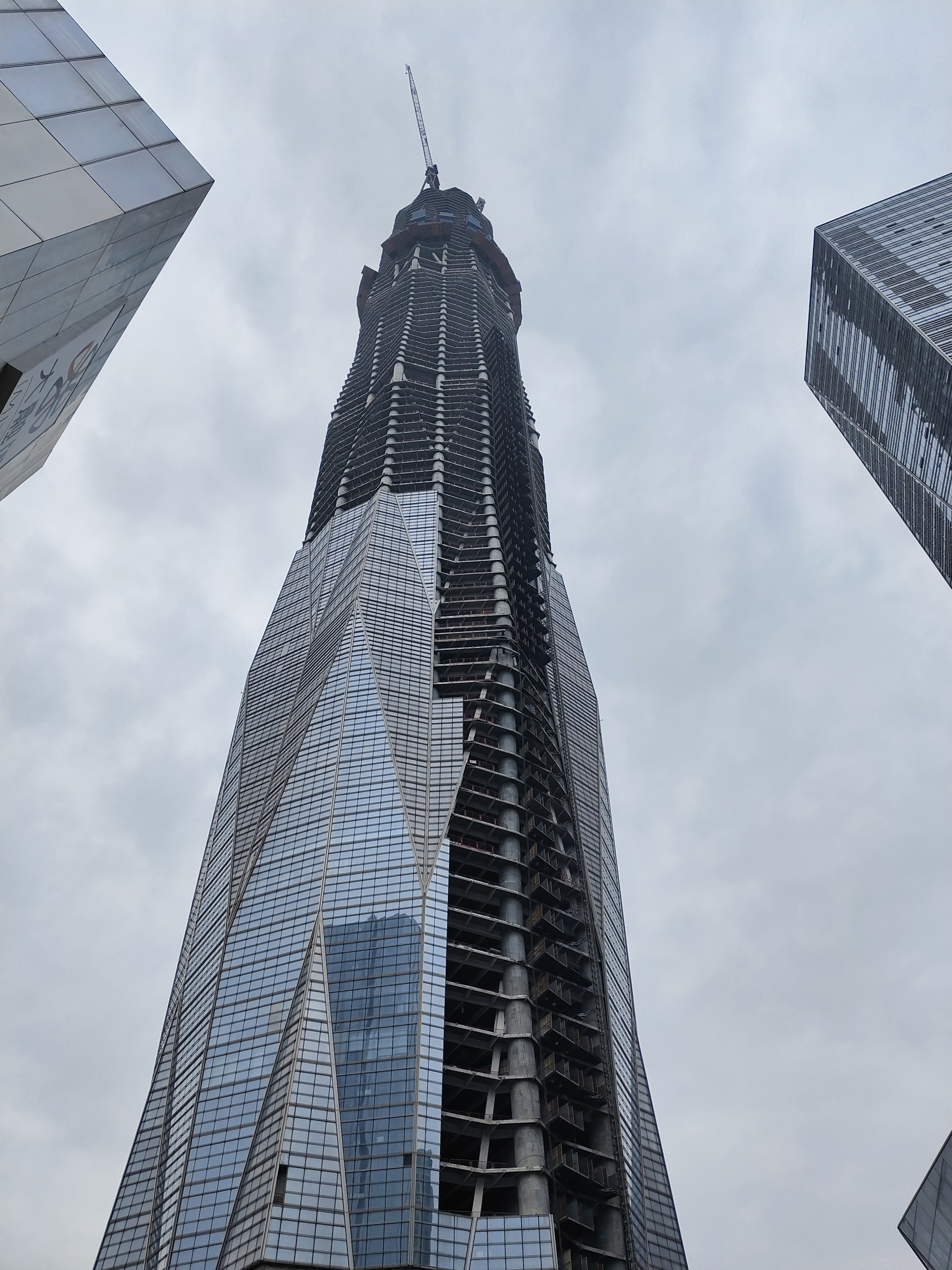
- The tower under construction in March 2026

General information
- Status: Under construction
- Location: Chengdu, China
- Coordinates: 30.6067°N 104.1543°E
- Construction started: 21 November 2014
- Estimated completion: 2029
- Opened: 2026
- Cost: USD 1.072 Billion
- Owner: Greenland Group

Height
- Architectural: 468 m (1,535 ft)
- Top floor: 448.2 m / 1,470 ft

Technical details
- Floor count: 101 (Additional 4 underground)
- Floor area: 220,000 m^{2} (2,400,000 ft^{2})

Design and construction
- Architect: Adrian Smith + Gordon Gill Architecture
- Architecture firm: CRTEC
- Structural engineer: Thornton Tomasetti
- Services engineer: CRTEC
- Civil engineer: CRTEC
- Other designers: CRTEC

Other information
- Parking: 1,651

Chengdu Greenland Tower is an under construction supertall skyscraper in Chengdu, Sichuan, China. It will have a height of 468 metres (1,535 ft) with 101 floors. Construction began in 2014 and was halted in early 2019. Work resumed in mid-2020 but was halted again in 2023 when it was close to topping out at its full height. In April 2025 the Greenland Group announced construction would restart. It is projected that when it is completed, it will be the tallest building in Chengdu and southwestern China.

== See also ==
- List of tallest buildings in China
- List of buildings with 100 floors or more
