= China State Construction Engineering Corporation =

Largest construction company in the world by revenue

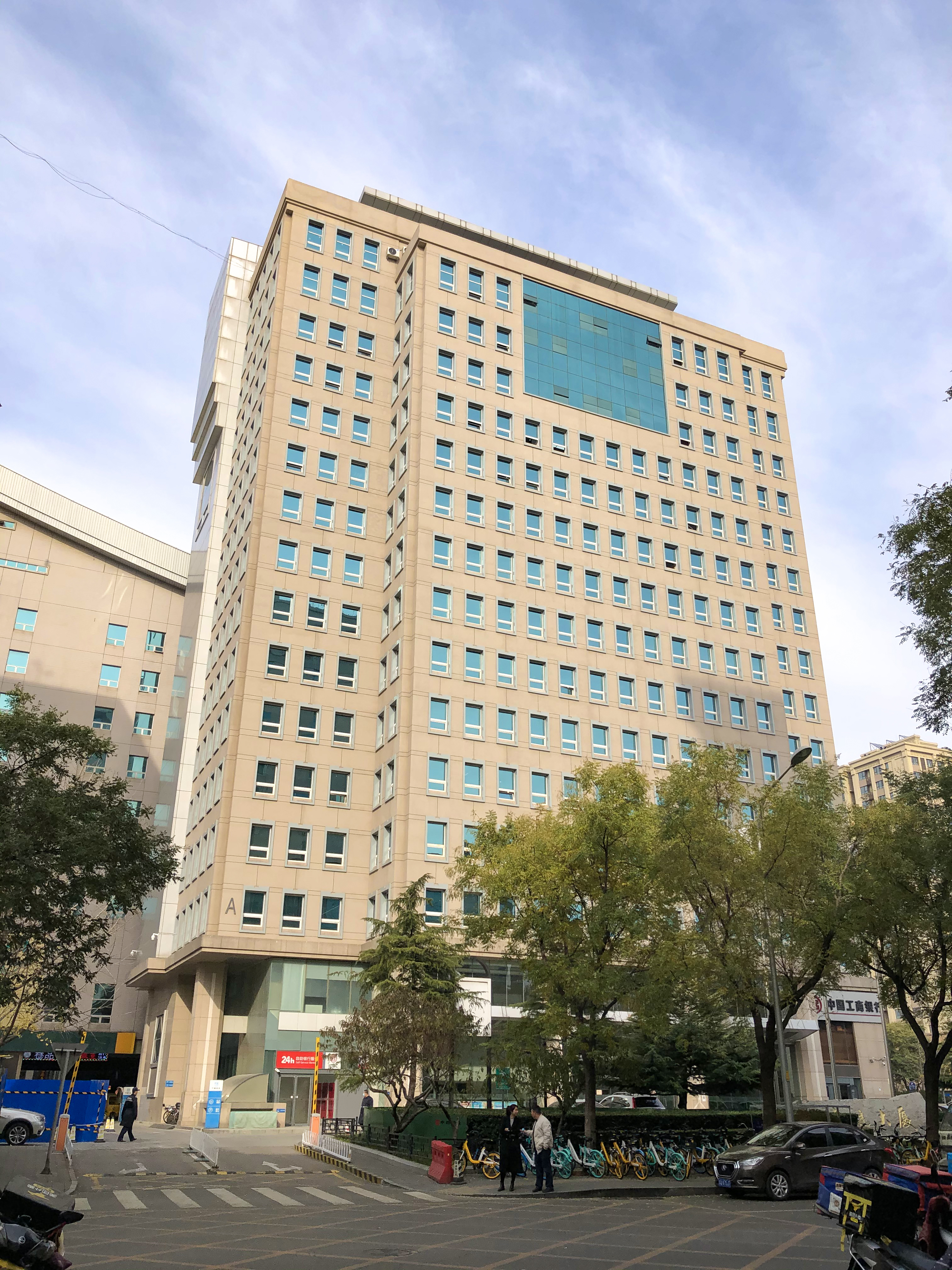
- Headquarters in Beijing
- Native name: 中国建筑集团有限公司
- Type: State-owned enterprise
- Traded as: SSE: SSE: 601668 (CSCEC Ltd.); SSE 50 component; CSI 300 component
- Industry: Construction; Civil engineering; Real estate development; Engineering design
- Founded: 1957; 69 years ago
- Headquarters: Beijing, China
- Area served: Worldwide
- Key people: Zheng Xuexuan (Chairman & Party Secretary); Zhang Zhaoxiang (General Manager)
- Products: Residential and commercial real estate; Infrastructure (railways, bridges, highways, airports, ports, nuclear plants); Modular & prefabricated building units; Heavy construction equipment
- Services: General contracting & construction; EPC (Turnkey contracting); Architectural & engineering design; Urban planning & land surveying; Real estate investment & development; Property management & facility operations
- Revenue: ▼CN¥2.08 trillion (2025) (US$310.81 billion)
- Operating income: ▼CN¥70.22 billion (2025) (US$10.48 billion)
- Net income: ▼CN¥39.07 billion (2025) (US$5.83 billion)
- Total assets: ▲CN¥3.56 trillion (2025) (US$531.53 billion)
- Total equity: ▲CN¥491.56 billion (2025) (US$73.38 billion)
- Owner: SASAC (Central People's Government)
- Number of employees: 370,272 (2025)
- Subsidiaries: China State Construction Engineering Corporation Limited (57.03%); China Overseas Land and Investment; China State Construction International Holdings
- Website: english.cscec.com

China State Construction Engineering Corporation
- Simplified Chinese: 中国建筑集团有限公司
- Traditional Chinese: 中國建築集團有限公司
Transcriptions
Standard Mandarin
- Hanyu Pinyin: Zhōngguó jiànzhú jítuán yǒuxiàn gōngsī

The China State Construction Engineering Corporation (CSCEC; 中国建筑集团有限公司) is a Chinese state-owned construction company headquartered in Beijing. It is the largest construction company in the world by revenue and the 8th largest general contractor in terms of overseas sales, as of 2020. In 2023, the company was ranked 66th in the Forbes Global 2000.

While most of the assets of CSCEC were floated in the stock exchange as China State Construction Engineering Corporation Limited (CSCECL), CSCEC retained some assets such as schools and hospitals, as well as the stake in China Construction International Corporation (中国对外建设总公司) which was not able to be transferred. Thus, CSCEC granted the listed company supervising rights.

This construction firm has built several of the world's tallest buildings and largest construction megaprojects (see Projects list below).

== Corporate structure ==
The CSCEC has numerous branches or subsidiaries. It is divided into five main divisions and twelve traditional core business areas, including eight Group's engineering offices and four Design Institutes, as well as its own national research laboratory. The main business units of the group are planning and design, project development, equipment leasing, trade, construction and facilities management.

Its subsidiary and listed company, China State Construction Engineering Corporation Limited (CSCECL) (Chinese: 中国建筑股份有限公司) (SSE: 601668), was established in 2007. It was listed on the Shanghai Stock Exchange in 2009 with its IPO price at RMB$4.18 per share. The shares closed at RMB$6.53, 56% higher than its IPO price, at the first trading day. It was the world's biggest IPO in 2009, raising US$7.3 billion of capital.

== History ==
The CSCEC was founded in 1957 as a state company. Early on the country had an international profile building heavy industry and infrastructure in Asia, Africa, and the Middle East. The predecessor company opened its first overseas office in Kuwait in the late 1970s. The company broke from its regionally confined work pattern when it entered the U.S. market in 1985, opening an office in Atlanta. The U.S. subsidiary began by building housing developments with joint venture partners before undertaking its first sole development, Lantana Lakes, a 107-acre, $27 million complex of 42 homes, in 1987 in Jacksonville, Florida.

In 2009, the company was blacklisted for six years by the World Bank for collusion in the bidding process for the Philippines National Roads Improvement and Management Project.

With the encouragement of the Chinese government and financing assistance from the Export-Import Bank of China, CSCEC has taken increasingly bold steps as a builder and investor of overseas projects. In 2011, the going abroad trend hit a new high when Baha Mar Resorts, a $3.4 billion casino and resort built and partially owned by CSCEC, opened after "extremely aggressive" efforts by the company to link with the Bahamas developer that started the project. It was the largest construction project undertaken by a Chinese company outside of China.

The China State Construction Engineering Corporation is also constructing the new Athletics and Football Stadium in Grenada.

In 2020, after the coronavirus outbreak, CSCEC built two hospitals in Wuhan in the span of 10 to 12 days. The 1,000-bed Huoshenshan hospital was finished on February 3, while the 1,600-bed hospital Leishenshan was finished on February 5.

On 28 August 2020, the United States Department of Defense released the names of companies with ties to the People's Liberation Army operating directly or indirectly in the United States. China State Construction Group Co., Ltd. was included on the list. In November 2020, Donald Trump issued an executive order prohibiting any American company or individual from owning shares in companies that the United States Department of Defense has listed as having links to the People's Liberation Army, which included China State Construction Group.

Because of the company's continued business with Russia during Russian invasion of Ukraine, China State Construction Engineering is listed among International Sponsors of War by Ukrainian National Agency on Corruption Prevention.

In December 2023, China State Construction Engineers became a strategic partner with NWTN to develop new energy vehicles and green hydrogen projects. CCSCECL was responsible for managing the complex project construction process from planning and feasibility studies, to general contracting and financing assistance. NWTN will handle the projects investment and operations.

== Projects ==
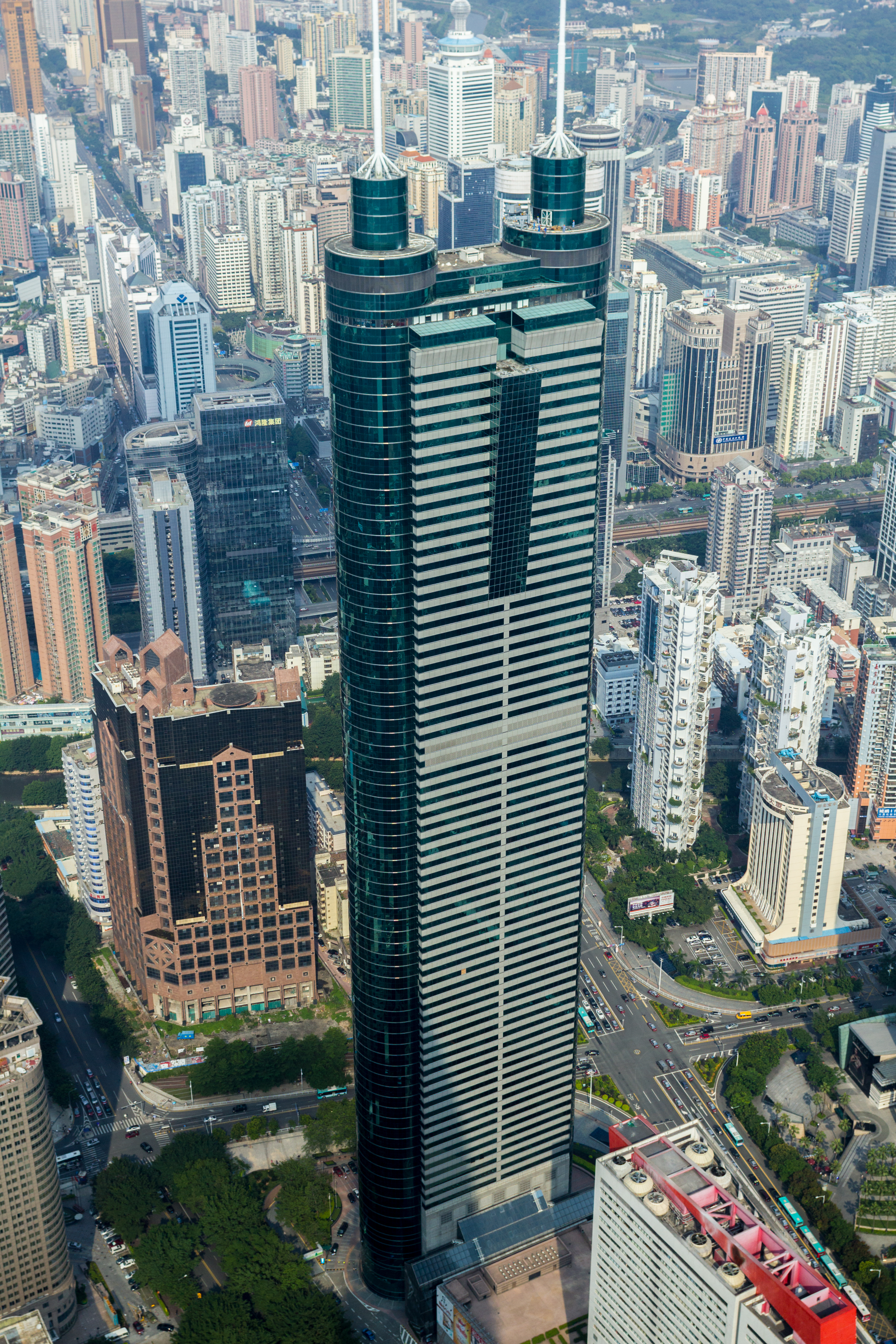
Shun Hing Square, Shenzhen

- Participated in constructing Daxing International Airport
- Construction of the Great Mosque of Algiers ($1.5 billion)
- Realization of the new university town of Constantine ($520 million)
- New extension of Algiers airport ($550 million)
- Construction of the New Administrative Capital of Egypt
- Cairo International Conference Center, Egypt
- AU Conference Center and Office Complex, Ethiopia
- Commercial Bank of Ethiopia Headquarters, Ethiopia
- Addis Ababa National Stadium, Ethiopia
- Renovation of the Alexander Hamilton Bridge, New York City, New York
- Ventilation shafts for the 7 Subway Extension, New York City, New York
- Sukh Chayn Gardens Housing Estate is a gated community in the suburbs of Lahore, Pakistan.
- Federation Tower, Tower A (Ostturm), Moscow: Europe's second-tallest skyscraper
- Shanghai World Financial Center, Shanghai
- Beijing National Aquatics Centre ("Water Cube", water cube): the new Chinese national swim center in Beijing (draft planning in community with the Australian company PTW Architects, the office Ove Arup, and China Construction Design International (CCDI)).
- Shun Hing Square, Shenzhen
- Missile test center of the Shenzhou Space Center (one of the three largest Chinese projects of the eighth five-year plan, won the 1st prize for national scientific and technical progress)
- Airport Passenger Terminal Hong Kong Chek Lap Kok
- One Thousand Museum, Miami, United States
- Leeza SOHO, Beijing, China
- Main administration building of the Bank of China, Hong Kong
- MGI Tower, Dhaka, Bangladesh
- Haier companies building (refrigerator manufacturer), South Carolina, United States
- Nanyang Technological University, Singapore
- Singapore General Hospital, A&E Block, Singapore
- Several HDB (Housing & Development Board) projects, Singapore.
- National Athletics & Football Stadium, Grenada
- Enlargement of the Australian Embassy, Beijing
- Embassy of Malaysia, Beijing
- New German Embassy, Beijing
- Sky City, Changsha
- Villa at the Consulate General in China, New York City, United States
- Sheraton Hotel, Pine Club, Algiers, Algeria
- Marriott Hotel, Shanghai
- Kempinski Hotel, Beijing
- Xianyang International Airport, Xi'an
- Baiyun International Airport, Guangzhou
- Taoxian International Airport, Shenyang
- Stadium project Stade des Martyrs, Kinshasa, Zaire
- Cricket Stadium, Barbados
- Kathmandu-Terai expressway Nepal,($1.2 billion)
- Jinnah Stadium, Islamabad, Pakistan
- National Geological Information Center, Botswana
- Underground water reservoir, Mmankgodi (in Gaborone), Botswana
- Gerald Road, Francistown, Botswana
- Binh Thuan Roadway Project SM2/SM3, South Saigon, Vietnam
- Culasi, Antique-Patnaongon Highway, Panay, Philippines
- North irrigation project Jazir, Iraq
- New Hindiya Dam, including railway bridge, the Euphrates, Iraq
- Boukourdane Dam, Algeria
- Mae Kuang Dam, Thailand
- Rama Bridge, Bangkok, Thailand
- 21st Century Tower, Shanghai
- Arfa Karim Technology Park, Lahore, Pakistan
- Lakeville Residences, Malaysia
- Burj Qatar, Qatar
- The Hilton Dhaka, Dhaka, Bangladesh
- University hospital of Sfax, Tunisia (since 2016).
- M5 Multan-Sukkar Motorways of Pakistan (CPEC)
- Trump International Golf Club, Dubai
- Medical project in Cambodia ($73.6 million)
- Mixed-use real estate development in Australia ($466.8 million)
- A major highway in Argentina ($2.13 billion)
- Tesla Giga Shanghai, Shanghai
- International Trade Center, Dongguan
- Rail Transit Control and Commercial Complex, Dongguan
- The Exchange 106 tower in Tun Razak Exchange (TRX), Kuala Lumpur
- Goldin Finance 117, Tianjin (on hold)
- MET 1 Residences @ KL Metropolis, Kuala Lumpur
- Urban Village Phase II Phnom Penh, Cambodia
- Nasiriyah Medical City in Iraq ($950 million)

== Subsidiaries ==
- China Overseas Land and Investment
- China Construction Design International
- China State Construction International Holdings
- China State Construction Engineering Corp. Middle East LLC.
- China State Construction Engineering (M) Sdn. Bhd.
- China State Construction Engineering Corporation, Ltd. - (Bel-Air, Makati) Phils. Main Branch
- China Construction First Group Corporation Ltd. (CCFGCL)
- China Construction Second Engineering Bureau Ltd. (CCSEBL)
- China Construction Third Engineering Bureau Co. Ltd. (CCTEBCL)-Phils. (Pasay) Branch
- CSCEC Strait Construction Corporation - (Third Group) - Binondo Manila Branch
- China Construction Fourth Engineering Bureau Co., Ltd. -Phils.(Taguig) Branch
- China Construction (South Pacific) Development Co. Pte. Ltd (CCDC) [Singapore]
