= List of architects of supertall buildings =

This is a list of architects who have designed, completed, or topped-out skyscrapers over 300 m (980 ft) tall (supertall).

Firm	Architect	Building	City	Country	Source(s)
5+design (United States)		Minying International Trade Center T2	Dongguan	China	
A + E Design (China)		Longxi International Hotel	Wuxi	China	
Adnan Saffarini (United Arab Emirates)		Princess Tower	Dubai	United Arab Emirates	
Adnan Saffarini (United Arab Emirates)		Elite Residence	Dubai	United Arab Emirates	
Adrian Smith + Gordon Gill Architecture (United States)		Zhongzhou Holdings Financial Center	Shenzhen	China	
Adrian Smith + Gordon Gill Architecture (United States)		Central Park Tower	New York City	United States	
Adrian Smith + Gordon Gill Architecture (United States)		Wuhan Greenland Center	Wuhan	China	
Adrian Smith + Gordon Gill Architecture (United States)		Uptown Tower	Dubai	United Arab Emirates	
AC Martin Partners (United States)	Albert Carey Martin	Wilshire Grand Center	Los Angeles	United States	
AECOM (United States)		Diwang International Fortune Center	Liuzhou	China	
Aedas (United Kingdom)	Andrew Bromberg	Ocean Heights	Dubai	United Arab Emirates	
Aedas (United Kingdom)		Deji Plaza Phase 2	Nanjing	China	
Aedas (United Kingdom)		Wuxi IFS	Wuxi	China	
Aedas (United Kingdom)		Heartland 66 Office Tower	Wuhan	China	
Aedas (United Kingdom)		Hengqin International Financial Center	Zhuhai	China	
Aedas (United Kingdom)		SLS Dubai	Dubai	United Arab Emirates	
Al Hashemi (United Arab Emirates)		HHHR Tower	Dubai	United Arab Emirates	
Archilier Architecture (United States)		Haitian Center Tower 2	Qingdao	China	
Architect Hafeez Contractor (India)	Hafeez Contractor	23 Marina	Dubai	United Arab Emirates	
Architect Hafeez Contractor (India)	Hafeez Contractor	Lokhandwala Minerva	Mumbai	India	
Architectural Design and Research Institute of SCUT (China)		Fortune Center	Guangzhou	China	
Architectural Design and Research Institute of SCUT (China)		Jiuzhou International Tower	Nanning	China	
Atkins (United Kingdom)		The Address Downtown Dubai	Dubai	United Arab Emirates	
Atkins (United Kingdom)	Tom Wright	Burj Al Arab	Dubai	United Arab Emirates	
Atkins (United Kingdom)		Almas Tower	Dubai	United Arab Emirates	
Atkins (United Kingdom)		Landmark 81	Ho Chi Minh City	Vietnam	
AUBE Design (France)		CFC Changfu Centre	Shenzhen	China	
Baikdoosan Architects & Engineers (North Korea)		Ryugyong Hotel	Pyongyang	North Korea	
Benoy (United Kingdom)		Chongqing IFS T1	Chongqing	China	
Büro Ole Scheeren Group (Germany)	Ole Scheeren	King Power Mahanakhon	Bangkok	Thailand	
China Construction Design International		Jinan Yunding Tower	Jinan	China	
	Christian de Portzamparc	One57	New York City	United States	
Cookfox (United States)		Bank of America Tower	New York City	United States	
Dalian Architectural Design & Research Institute (China)		Dalian International Trade Center	Dalian	China	
Dar Al-Handasah (Lebanon)		Abraj Al Bait Royal Clock Tower	Macca	Saudi Arabia	
Dar Al-Handasah (Lebanon)		Iconic Tower	New Administrative Capital	Egypt	
Dennis Lau & Ng Chun Man Architects (Hong Kong)		Central Plaza	Hong Kong	Hong Kong	
Dennis Lau & Ng Chun Man Architects (Hong Kong)		CITIC Plaza	Guangzhou	China	
Dennis Lau & Ng Chun Man Architects (Hong Kong)		The Center	Hong Kong	Hong Kong	
Dennis Lau & Ng Chun Man Architects (Hong Kong)		Nina Tower	Hong Kong	Hong Kong	
Dennis Lau & Ng Chun Man Architects (Hong Kong)		Logan Century Center 1	Nanning	China	
DeStefano + Partners (United States)		Haeundae Doosan We've the Zenith Tower A	Busan	South Korea	
East China Architectural Design & Research Institute		Shimao International Plaza	Shanghai	China	
East China Architectural Design & Research Institute		Wuhan Center	Wuhan	China	
East China Architectural Design & Research Institute		Golden Eagle Tiandi Tower A	Nanjing	China	
East China Architectural Design & Research Institute		Golden Eagle Tiandi Tower B	Nanjing	China	
East China Architectural Design & Research Institute		Golden Eagle Tiandi Tower C	Nanjing	China	
East China Architectural Design & Research Institute		Changsha Shimao World Financial Center	Changsha	China	
Ellerbe Becket (United States)		Kingdom Centre	Riyadh	Saudi Arabia	
Farrells (United Kingdom)		KK100	Shenzhen	China	
Fender Katsalidis Architects (Australia)		Australia 108	Melbourne	Australia	
Fender Katsalidis Architects (Australia)		Merdeka 118	Kuala Lumpur	Malaysia	
Foster and Partners (United Kingdom)		The Index	Dubai	United Arab Emirates	
Foster and Partners (United Kingdom)		Burj Mohammed bin Rashid	Abu Dhabi	United Arab Emirates	
Foster and Partners (United Kingdom)		Comcast Technology Center	Philadelphia	United States	
Foster and Partners (United Kingdom)		Varso	Warsaw	Poland	
Foster and Partners (United Kingdom)		Lusail Plaza Tower 3	Lusail	Qatar	
Foster and Partners (United Kingdom)		Lusail Plaza Tower 4	Lusail	Qatar	
Foster and Partners (United Kingdom)		270 Park Avenue	New York City	United States	
Frank Williams and Associates (Germany)		Mercury City Tower	Moscow	Russia	
Gensler (United States)		Shanghai Tower	Shanghai	China	
Goettsch Partners (United States)		Guangxi China Resources Tower	Nanning	China	
Guangdong Province Architectural Design and Research Institute (China)		Kunming Xishan Wanda Plaza North	Kunming	China	
Guangdong Province Architectural Design and Research Institute (China)		Kunming Xishan Wanda Plaza South	Kunming	China	
Guangzhou Hanhua Architects & Engineers (China)		The Pinnacle	Guangzhou	China	
Hadi Simaan Architects (Qatar)		Aspire Tower	Doha	Qatar	
	Helmut Jahn	Leatop Plaza	Guangzhou	China	
Heerim Architects & Planners (South Korea)		AON Hanoi Landmark 72	Hanoi	Vietnam	
Hijjas Kasturi Associates (Malaysia)		Menara Telekom	Kuala Lumpur	Malaysia	
HKR Architects (United Kingdom)		Abu Dhabi Plaza	Astana	Kazakhstan	
christoph ingenhoven architects (Germany)	Christoph Ingenhoven	Shimao International Plaza	Shanghai	China	
Jaeger Kahlen Partner (Germany)		Guangfa Securities Headquarters	Guangzhou	China	
	Jean Nouvel	53W53	New York City	United States	
John Portman & Associates (United States)		Guangxi Financial Investment Center	Nanning	China	
Khatib and Alami (Lebanon)		Rose Rayhaan by Rotana	Dubai	United Arab Emirates	
Khatib and Alami (Lebanon)		The Marina Torch	Dubai	United Arab Emirates	
Kohn Pedersen Fox (United States)		Shanghai World Financial Center	Shanghai	China	
Kohn Pedersen Fox (United States)		Posco Tower-Songdo	Incheon	South Korea	
Kohn Pedersen Fox (United States)		Forum 66	Shenyang	China	
Kohn Pedersen Fox (United States)		Guangzhou CTF Finance Center	Guangzhou	China	
Kohn Pedersen Fox (United States)		Ping An Finance Center	Shenzhen	China	
Kohn Pedersen Fox (United States)		Lotte World Tower	Seoul	South Korea	
Kohn Pedersen Fox (United States)		CITIC Tower	Beijing	China	
Kohn Pedersen Fox (United States)		China Resources Headquarters	Shenzhen	China	
Kohn Pedersen Fox (United States)		One Shenzhen Bay Tower 7	Shenzhen	China	
Kohn Pedersen Fox (United States)		Suzhou IFS	Suzhou	China	
Kohn Pedersen Fox (United States)		30 Hudson Yards	New York City	United States	
Kohn Pedersen Fox (United States)		35 Hudson Yards	New York City	United States	
Kohn Pedersen Fox (United States)		One Vanderbilt	New York City	United States	
Kohn Pedersen Fox (United States)		Spring City 66	Kunming	China	
Kohn Pedersen Fox (United States)		OCT Tower	Shenzhen	China	
Kohn Pedersen Fox (United States)		Dabaihui Plaza	Shenzhen	China	
Kohn Pedersen Fox (United States)		Vanke Center	Chongqing	China	
Kohn Pedersen Fox (United States)		Autograph Tower	Jakarta	Indonesia	
Kohn Pedersen Fox (United States)		Luminary Tower	Jakarta	Indonesia	
K.Y. Cheung Design Associates (China)		Shun Hing Square	Shenzhen	China	
Lanzhou Nonferrous Metallurgy Design and Research Institute (China)		Honglou Times Square	Lanzhou	China	
Chu-Yuan Lee		Tuntex Sky Tower	Kaohsiung	Taiwan	
Chu-Yuan Lee		Taipei 101	Taipei	Taiwan	
Chu-Yuan Lee		Chongqing World Financial Center	Chongqing	China	
Loebl Schlossman & Hackl (United States)		Two Prudential Plaza	Chicago	United States	
LWK & Partners (Singapore)		Twin Towers Guiyang, East Tower	Guiyang	China	
LWK & Partners (Singapore)		Twin Towers Guiyang, West Tower	Guiyang	China	
Morphosis Architects (United States)		Hanking Center	Shenzhen	China	
	Moshe Safdie	Raffles City Chongqing T3N	Chongqing	China	
	Moshe Safdie	Raffles City Chongqing T4N	Chongqing	China	
Mulia Group Architects (Malaysia)		The Exchange 106	Kuala Lumpur	Malaysia	
NBBJ (United States)		Eton Place Dalian	Dalian	China	
Nikken Sekkei (Japan)		One Za'abeel Tower 1	Dubai	United Arab Emirates	
Norr Group (United Arab Emirates)		Emirates Office Tower	Dubai	United Arab Emirates	
Norr Group (United Arab Emirates)		Jumeirah Emirates Towers Hotel	Dubai	United Arab Emirates	
Norr Group (United Arab Emirates)		Address Boulevard	Dubai	United Arab Emirates	
Norr Group (United Arab Emirates)	Yahya Jan	Ciel Tower	Dubai	United Arab Emirates	
NRY Architects (Malaysia)		Four Seasons Place Kuala Lumpur	Kuala Lumpur	Malaysia	
Pei Cobb Freed & Partners (United States)	Henry N. Cobb	U.S. Bank Tower	Los Angeles	United States	
Pei Cobb Freed & Partners (United States)	I. M. Pei	JPMorgan Chase Tower	Houston	United States	
Pei Cobb Freed & Partners (United States)	I. M. Pei	Bank of China Tower	Hong Kong	Hong Kong	
Pelli Clarke Pelli Architects (United States)	César Pelli	Petronas Twin Towers 1	Kuala Lumpur	Malaysia	
Pelli Clarke Pelli Architects (United States)	César Pelli	Petronas Twin Towers 2	Kuala Lumpur	Malaysia	
Pelli Clarke Pelli Architects (United States)	César Pelli	2 International Finance Centre	Hong Kong	Hong Kong	
Pelli Clarke Pelli Architects (United States)	César Pelli	Abeno Harukas	Osaka	Japan	
Pelli Clarke Pelli Architects (United States)	César Pelli	Salesforce Tower	San Francisco	United States	
Pelli Clarke Pelli Architects (United States)	César Pelli	Baoneng Center	Shenzhen	China	
Pelli Clarke Pelli Architects (United States)	César Pelli	1 Corporate Avenue	Wuhan	China	
Pelli Clarke Pelli Architects (United States)	César Pelli	Azabudai Hills Mori JP Tower	Tokyo	Japan	
Pelli Clarke Pelli Architects (United States)	César Pelli	City Tower One	Dubai	United Arab Emirates	
Plan Architects (Thailand)		Baiyoke Tower II	Bangkok	Thailand	
Renzo Piano Building Workshop (Italy)	Renzo Piano	The New York Times Building	New York City	United States	
Renzo Piano Building Workshop (Italy)	Renzo Piano	The Shard	London	United Kingdom	
Rafael Viñoly Building Workshop (Uruguay)	Rafael Viñoly	432 Park Avenue	New York City	United States	
RMJM (United Kingdom)		Gate to the East	Suzhou	China	
RMJM (United Kingdom)		Zhuhai Tower	Zhuhai	China	
RMJM (United Kingdom)		Suning Plaza, Zhenjiang	Zhenjiang	China	
RMJM (United Kingdom)		Lakhta Center	Saint Petersburg	Russia	
RMJM (United Kingdom)		Shenzhen Bay Innovation and Technology Centre Tower 1	Shenzhen	China	
Rocco Design Architects (Hong Kong)		International Metropolitan Plaza	Guangzhou	China	
Roche-Dinkeloo (United States)	Kevin Roche	Bank of America Plaza	Atlanta	United States	
Rogers Stirk Harbour + Partners (United Kingdom)	Richard Rogers	3 World Trade Center	New York City	United States	
Rogers Stirk Harbour + Partners (United Kingdom)	Richard Rogers	Parc1 Tower	Seoul	South Korea	
RTKL Associates (United States)		Suning Plaza, Wuxi	Wuxi	China	
RTKL Associates (United States)		Wenzhou World Trade Center	Wenzhou	China	
RW Armstrong (United States)		Sky Tower	Abu Dhabi	United Arab Emirates	
Shreve, Lamb and Harmon (United States)		Empire State Building	New York City	United States	
SHoP Architects (United States)		111 West 57th Street	New York City	United States	
SHoP Architects (United States)		The Brooklyn Tower	New York City	United States	
Skidmore, Owings and Merrill (United States)	Bruce Graham, Fazlur Rahman Khan	John Hancock Center	Chicago	United States	
Skidmore, Owings and Merrill (United States)	Bruce Graham, Fazlur Rahman Khan	Willis Tower	Chicago	United States	
Skidmore, Owings and Merrill (United States)	Richard Keating	Wells Fargo Plaza	Houston	United States	
Skidmore, Owings and Merrill (United States)	Adrian Smith	Jin Mao Tower	Shanghai	China	
Skidmore, Owings and Merrill (United States)	Adrian Smith	Franklin Center	Chicago	United States	
Skidmore, Owings and Merrill (United States)	Adrian Smith	Trump International Hotel and Tower	Chicago	United States	
Skidmore, Owings and Merrill (United States)	Adrian Smith	Burj Khalifa	Dubai	United Arab Emirates	
Skidmore, Owings and Merrill (United States)	Adrian Smith	Nanjing Greenland Financial Center	Nanjing	China	
Skidmore, Owings and Merrill (United States)	Adrian Smith	China World Trade Center Tower III	Beijing	China	
Skidmore, Owings and Merrill (United States)	Gordan Gill	Pearl River Tower	Guangzhou	China	
Skidmore, Owings and Merrill (United States)		Tianjin World Financial Center	Tianjin	China	
Skidmore, Owings and Merrill (United States)	David Childs	One World Trade Center	New York City	United States	
Skidmore, Owings and Merrill (United States)		OKO South Tower	Moscow	Russia	
Skidmore, Owings and Merrill (United States)		Greenland Puli Center	Jinan	China	
Skidmore, Owings and Merrill (United States)		Tianjin Modern City Office Tower	Tianjin	China	
Skidmore, Owings and Merrill (United States)		Hon Kwok City Center	Shenzhen	China	
Skidmore, Owings and Merrill (United States)		White Magnolia Plaza	Shanghai	China	
Skidmore, Owings and Merrill (United States)		Tianjin CTF Finance Centre	Tianjin	China	
Skidmore, Owings and Merrill (United States)		Haeundae LCT The Sharp Landmark Tower	Busan	South Korea	
Skidmore, Owings and Merrill (United States)		Haeundae LCT The Sharp Residential Tower A	Busan	South Korea	
Skidmore, Owings and Merrill (United States)		Haeundae LCT The Sharp Residential Tower B	Busan	South Korea	
Skidmore, Owings and Merrill (United States)		One Manhattan West	New York City	United States	
Skidmore, Owings and Merrill (United States)		Shum Yip Upperhills Tower 1	Shenzhen	China	
	Edward Durell Stone	Aon Center	Chicago	United States	
Studio Gang Architects (United States)	Jeanne Gang	St. Regis Chicago	Chicago	United States	
Super Geometry Architects (Hong Kong)		Guiyang International Financial Center T1	Guiyang	China	
Sunland Group (Australia)		Q1	Gold Coast	Australia	
Tchoban Voss Architekten (Germany)		Federation Tower East Tower	Moscow	Russia	
Tongji Architectural Design (China)		Moi Center	Shenyang	China	
UNStudio (Netherlands)	Ben van Berkel	Wasl Tower	Dubai	United Arab Emirates	
Urban Architects (Thailand)		Magnolias Waterfront Residences Iconsiam	Bangkok	Thailand	
Vizzion Mimarlik (Turkey)	Şefik Birkiye	CBRT Tower	Istanbul	Turkey	
Wilkinson Eyre (United Kingdom)		Guangzhou International Finance Center	Guangzhou	China	
Wilkinson Eyre (United Kingdom)		Yuexiu Fortune Center Tower 1	Wuhan	China	
	William Van Alen	Chrysler Building	New York City	United States	
Wong & Ouyang (Hong Kong)		One Island East	Hong Kong	Hong Kong	
Wong & Ouyang (Hong Kong)		International Commerce Centre	Hong Kong	Hong Kong	
Wong & Ouyang (Hong Kong)		East Pacific Business Center Tower A	Shenzhen	China	
Wong Tung & Partners (Hong Kong)		Yantai Shimao No.1 The Harbour	Yantai	China	
Wong Tung & Partners (Hong Kong)		Changsha IFS Tower 1	Changsha	China	
Wong Tung & Partners (Hong Kong)		Changsha IFS Tower 2	Changsha	China	
Woods Bagot (Australia)		Xiangjiang Fortune Finance Center Tower 1	Changsha	China	
Wuhan Architectural Design Institute (China)		Minsheng Bank Building	Wuhan	China	
Zaha Hadid Architects (United Kingdom)		Nanjing International Youth Cultural Centre Tower 1	Nanjing	China	
