= Riverview Plaza =

Supertall skyscraper in Wuhan, Hubei, China

- 武汉天地
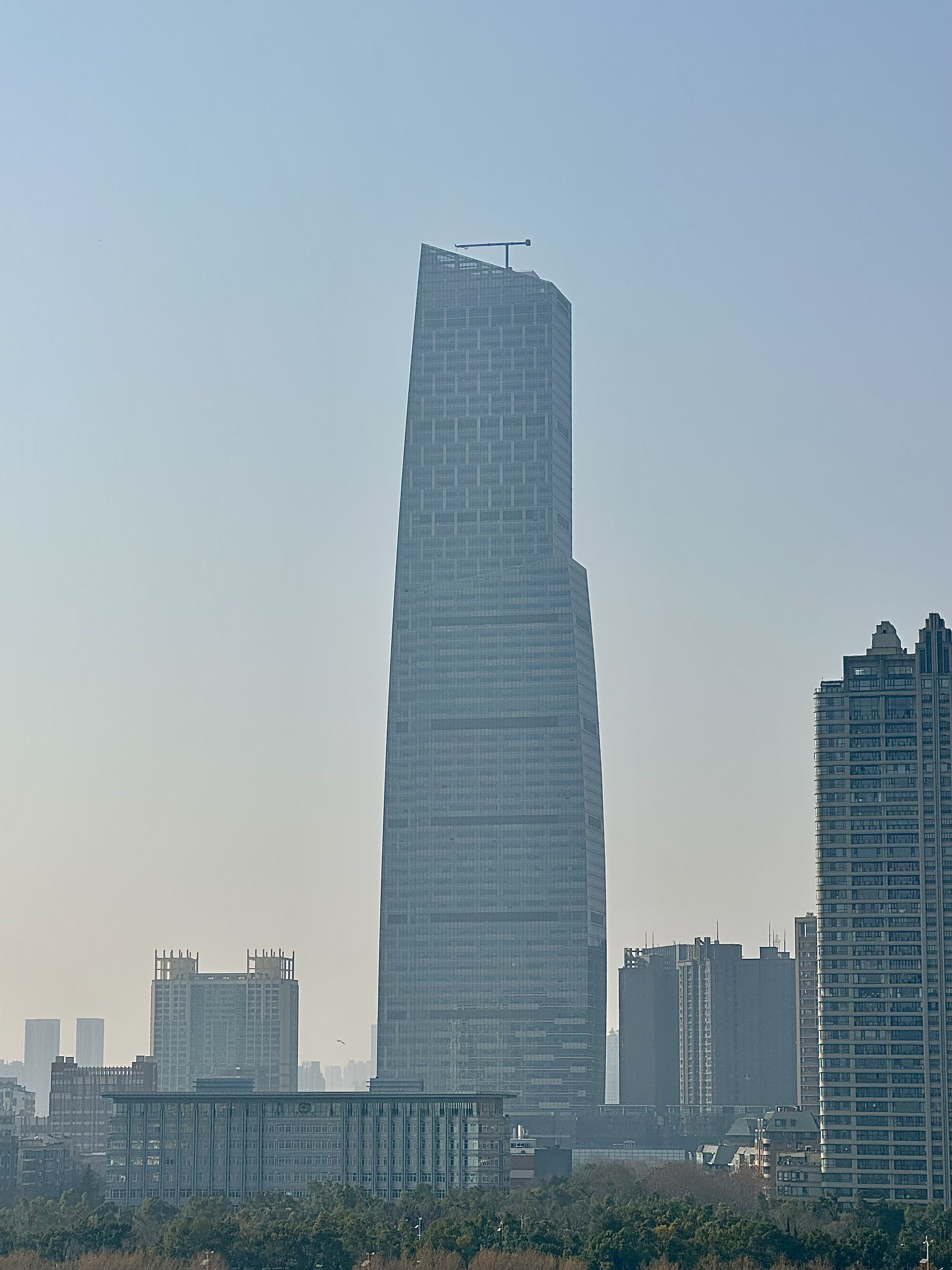
- Wuhan Riverview Plaza A1 in 2024
- Interactive map of the Riverview Plaza area
- Alternative names: 1 Corporate Avenue, Wuhan Tiandi Corporate Center A1

General information
- Status: Completed
- Type: Hotel, Office
- Location: Wuhan, Hubei, Jiefang Avenue, China
- Groundbreaking: 2010
- Construction started: January 17, 2013
- Completed: 2021
- Opened: 2021
- Owner: Shui On Land

Height
- Architectural: 376 m (1,234 ft)
- Tip: 376 m (1,234 ft)
- Top floor: 330.3 m (1,084 ft)

Technical details
- Floor count: 73 (+3 underground)
- Floor area: 185,296 m^{2} (1,994,510 sq ft)
- Lifts/elevators: 42

Design and construction
- Architecture firm: Pelli Clarke Pelli
- Structural engineer: P & T Group
- Services engineer: P & T Group
- Main contractor: China State Construction Engineering

Other information
- Number of rooms: 256
- Parking: 2,885

Riverview Plaza, formerly known as Wuhan Tiandi A1, is a 376-meter tall skyscraper in Wuhan, China. It is currently the third-tallest building in the city, behind Wuhan Greenland Center and Wuhan Center.

== See also ==
- List of tallest buildings in China
