= Guangdong Development Bank Building =

Supertall skyscraper in Wuhan, Hubei, China

- 武汉广发银行大厦
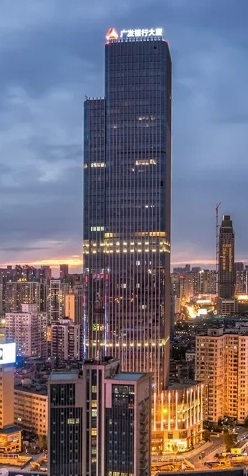

General information
- Status: Completed
- Type: Office
- Location: Wuhan, Hubei, China, H7XF+6V6, Jianshe Avenue, Jianghan District, Wuhan
- Coordinates: 30.59804°N 114.27462°E
- Construction started: 2010
- Completed: 2014

Height
- Roof: 218 m (715 ft)
- Top floor: 231 m (758 ft)

Technical details
- Structural system: Reinforced concrete
- Floor count: 51 (+2 underground)
- Floor area: 104,368 m^{2} (1,120,000 sq ft)
- Lifts/elevators: 21

Design and construction
- Developer: Hubei Xinhai Shengdun Real Estate Co.

The Guangdong Development Bank Building (Chinese: 武汉广发银行大厦) is an office skyscraper in the Jianghan District of Wuhan, China. Built between 2010 and 2014, the tower stands at 218 m (715 ft) tall by roof height (231 m (758 ft) by antenna spire height) with 51 floors and is the current 16th tallest building in Wuhan.

== History ==
=== Architecture ===
Development Bank Building is located at the northwest corner of the intersection of Jianshe Avenue and Yunlin Street in Wuhan City. It is adjacent to Jianshe Avenue to the south, Wuhan Acrobatic Hall to the east, Huayincheng Residence to the north, and Yinquan Building to the west. It is a class A office building.

The total land area of the China Guangfa Bank Building is approximately 7,417 square meters, and the total construction area is 90,362 square meters, of which the above-ground construction area is 78,517 square meters and the underground construction area is 11,845 square meters. The building has 51 floors, a plot ratio of 10.0, a green area ratio of 25%, and a building height of 224 meters. Floors 1 to 5 are podiums with a floor height of 5 to 7 meters, and a standard floor height of 4 meters. The building started construction at the end of 2009 and was put into use in 2014. When the building was first built, the companies and institutions that moved in included the Wuhan Branch of China Guangfa Bank, Wuhan Investment and Financing Service Chamber of Commerce, Hubei Zhongrong Huitong Investment Co., Ltd., Hanfei Investment Holding Group Co., Ltd. and Hubei Agricultural Production Materials Group Co., Ltd.

On May 6, 2023, the Wuhan Guangfa Bank Building Red Cross Society was established. This is the first Red Cross Society in Wuhan based on a skyscraper building.

== See also ==
- List of tallest buildings in China
- List of tallest buildings in Wuhan
