= International Finance Complex =

General information
- Status: Under construction
- Type: Mix-use
- Location: Phnom Penh, Cambodia
- Construction started: June 2008
- Estimated completion: 2012
- Cost: US$1 billion

Technical details
- Floor count: 52

Design and construction
- Developer: GS Engineering & Construction
- Main contractor: GS Engineering & Construction

The International Finance Complex is a 52 story complex that is in the process of being built in Phnom Penh, Cambodia near the Tonle Bassac River. The complex, which will cover an area of 737,000 square feet (68,500 m^{2}), will cost about $1 billion. The project will include a main office tower which is 52 storeys tall, making it the tallest building in all of Cambodia once it is completed. This tower will be surrounded by 6 smaller buildings, each standing 32 floors tall. Overall, there will be housing for an international school, a conference center, 1,064 apartment units and 275 serviced apartments. The project is being hailed by Cambodia's leaders as a symbol of the country's galloping economy, which has averaged 11 percent growth over the past three years. Deputy Prime Minister Sok An said that "IFC is the highest building in the history of Cambodia's capital and is a symbol of the economic growth in Cambodia." When it is completed in 2012, it will dramatically change the skyline of Phnom Penh, along with the other buildings scheduled to be completed around this time such as Gold Tower 42, OCIC Tower, River Palace, and many more.

== Project scales down ==
In November 2008, the project was scaled down due to the 2008 financial crisis. The seven building, 1 billion dollar complex was cut back to three buildings at half the price according to the developer. The revised plan will include two 51 floor condominiums and one mixed-use 52 floor building. Construction on the project has halted until 2010 while the company submits revised plans to the Royal Government for approval.

== See also ==
- List of tallest buildings in the world
- List of tallest buildings and structures in the world
- List of architects of supertall buildings
