= Wuhan World Trade Tower =

Skyscraper in Wuhan, Hubei, China

Coordinates: 30°34′58″N 114°15′47″E

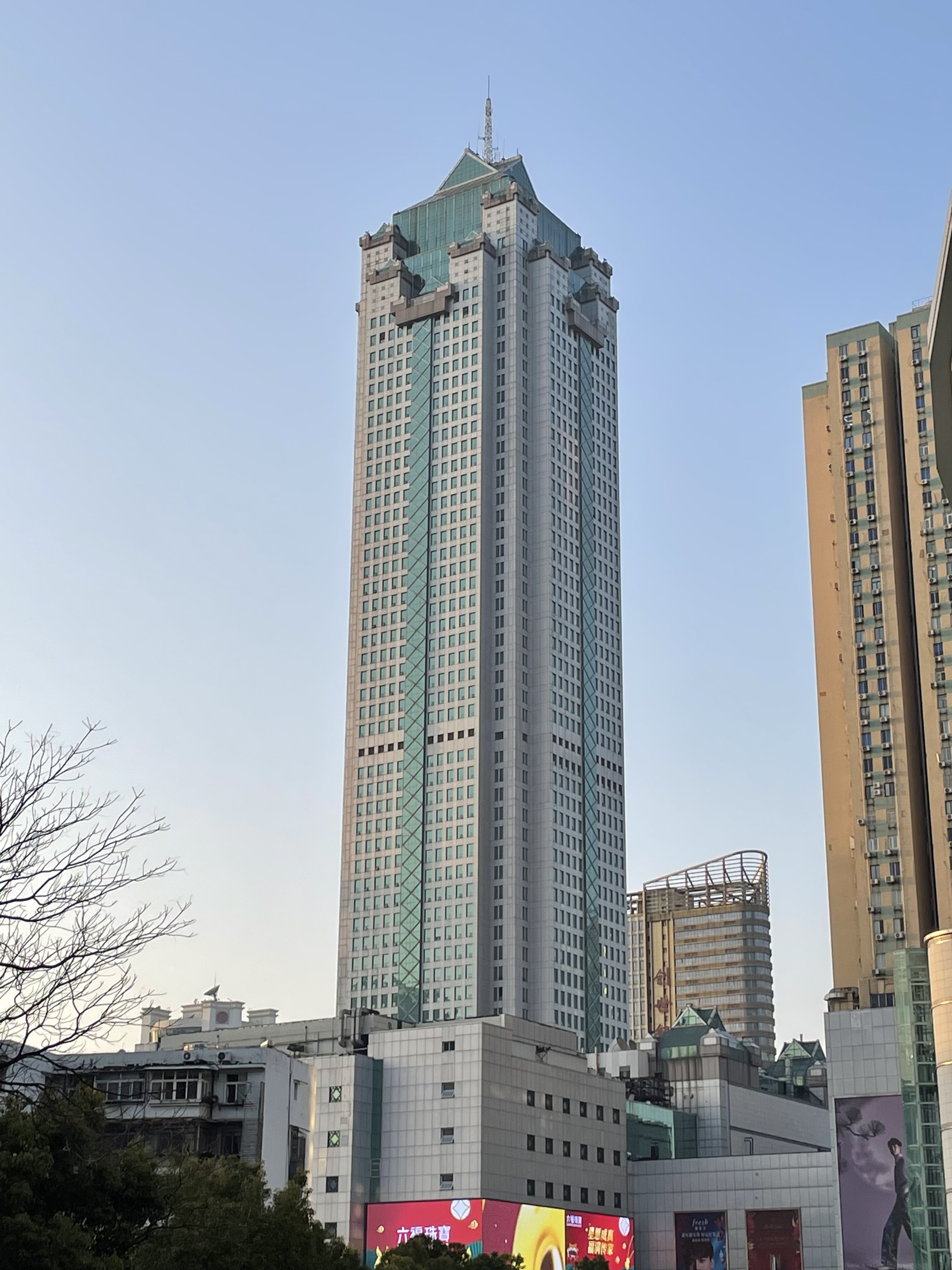
- Interactive map of the Wuhan World Trade Tower area

General information
- Status: Completed
- Location: 686 Jiefang Dadao, Wuhan, China
- Completed: 1998

Height
- Tip: 912 ft (278 m)

Technical details
- Floor count: 60 (+2 below-grade)
- Floor area: 1,291,669 sq ft (120,000.0 m^{2})
- Lifts/elevators: 13

Design and construction
- Architect: Wuhan Architectural Institute

The Wuhan World Trade Tower (Chinese: 武汉世界贸易大厦) is a 273-meter (896 foot) tall skyscraper located in Wuhan, Hubei, China. It became the tallest building in Wuhan after its completion. However, it was surpassed by the Minsheng Bank Building in 2007. As of September 2025 it is the 9th tallest in Wuhan measured up to the highest architectural point.

It was completed in 1998 and has 60 floors, two of which are underground and 58 are above ground. The lower levels of serve as a shopping mall and all levels above the mall serve as office spaces.

The tower's total height is 273 meters with the antenna. The tower is 248 metres tall up to the spire and 229 meters tall up to the roof. It has a total floor area of 1,430,000 square meters. The postmodern skyscraper is a tube-in-tube style structure with a curtain wall facade.

== See also ==
- List of skyscrapers
- List of tallest buildings in Wuhan
- List of tallest buildings in China
