= Wuhan CFD Time Finance Center =

Supertall skyscraper in Wuhan, Hubei, China

- 红人财富中心 or 武汉CFD时代财富中心
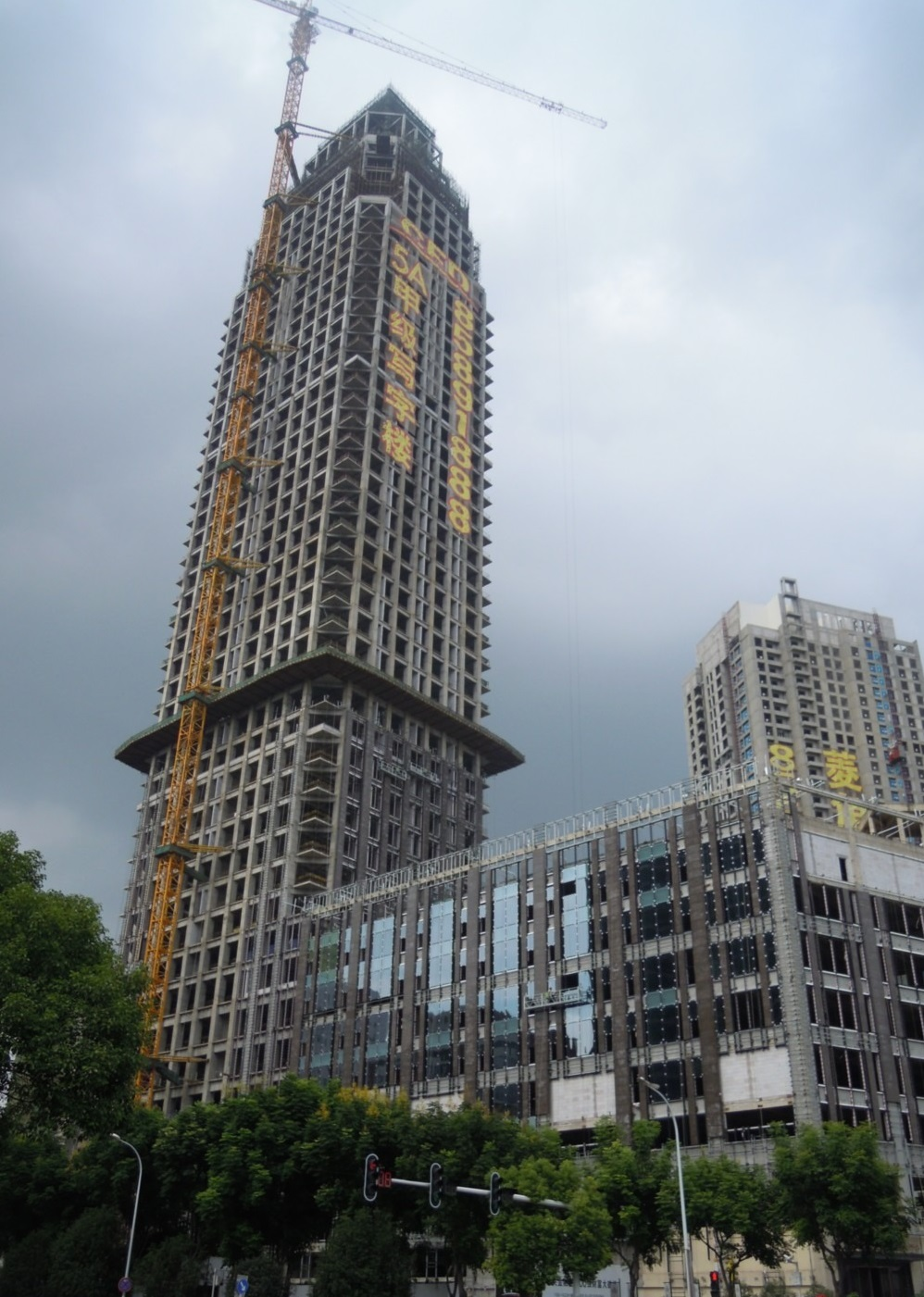
- Interactive map of the Wuhan CFD Time Finance Center area

General information
- Status: Completed
- Type: Office
- Location: Wuhan, Hubei, China, J73C+WM4, Changjiangribao Rd, Jianghan District, Wuhan
- Coordinates: 30.60477°N 114.27170°E
- Construction started: 2013
- Completed: 2016

Height
- Roof: 264.7 m (868 ft)

Technical details
- Structural system: Reinforced concrete
- Floor count: 47 (+2 underground)
- Floor area: 100,000 m^{2} (1,080,000 sq ft)

Design and construction
- Developer: Redman Group R26; Zhonglian Real Estate

The Wuhan CFD Time Finance Center also known as the Hongren Fortune Center (Chinese: 红人财富中心) is an office skyscraper in the Jianghan District of Wuhan, China. Built between 2013 and 2016, the tower stands at 264.7 m (868 ft) tall with 47 floors and is the current 10th tallest building in Wuhan.

== Architecture ==
The project is located at the intersection of Xinhua Road and Changjiang Daily Road in Hankou, Wuhan. It is adjacent to the Lingjiao Lake in the north, the Xinhua Road in the west, and the Changjiang Daily Road in the south. The building has an Art Deco architectural style, and the exterior wall is made of dry-hanging stone combined with LOW-E glass, showing an international classic style. It is an office building developed by Redman Group R26 and Zhonglian Real Estate on the Wuhan Inner Ring Financial Cross Axis.

CFD Times Wealth Center is a 5A Class A office building developed by Redman Group Zhonglian Real Estate on the Wuhan Inner Ring Financial Cross Axis. The total construction area of the project is nearly 100,000 m^{2} (1,080,000 sq ft), including 69,000 m^{2} (743,000 sq ft) of office buildings and 15,000 square meters of commercial buildings. The plot ratio is 6.09, the total building height is 218 meters, with 46 floors above ground and 2 floors underground.

== See also ==
- List of tallest buildings in China
- List of tallest buildings in Wuhan
