= Moi Center =

Supertall skyscraper in Shenyang, Liaoning, China

Coordinates: 41.7644°N 123.4361°E

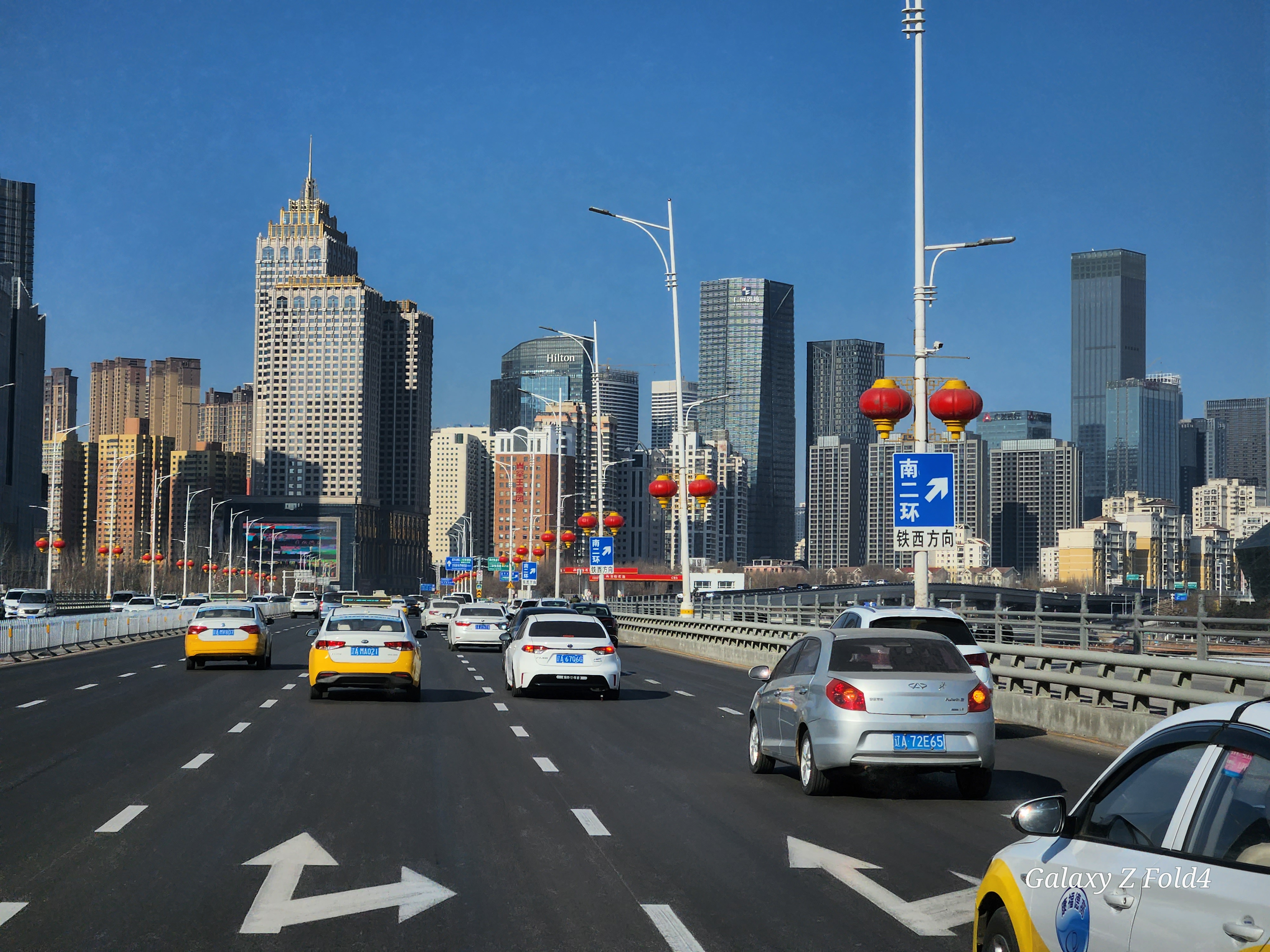
- Skyline of Shenyang, with the Moi Center on the far right
- Interactive map of the Moi Center area

General information
- Status: Completed
- Location: Shenyang, China
- Construction started: April 9, 2008
- Completed: November 24, 2014 (Tower A); June 22, 2012 (Tower B); June 14, 2013 (Tower C)

Height
- Height: 311 m (1,020 ft) (Tower A); 187.8 m (616 ft) (Tower B); 163.2 m (535 ft) (Tower C)

Technical details
- Floor count: 75 (Tower A); 54 (Tower B); 44 (Tower C)

Moi Center is a complex of three buildings in Shenyang, China.

== See also ==
- List of tallest buildings in Shenyang
- List of tallest buildings in China
