= Wuhan Yangtze River Shipping Center =

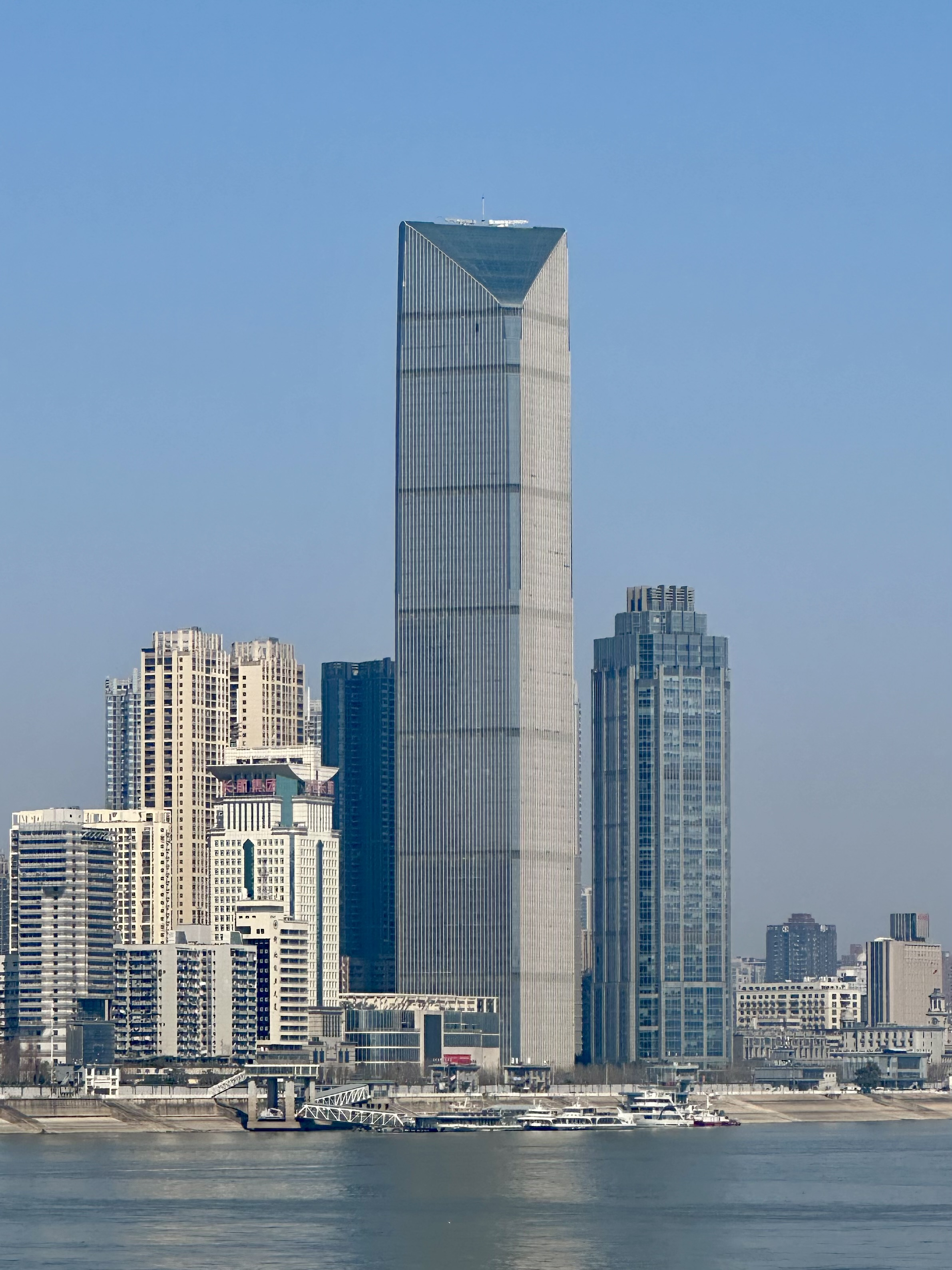
- Wuhan Yangtze River Shipping Center in February 2024

General information
- Status: Completed
- Type: Hotel, Office
- Location: Yanjiang Avenue, Wuhan, Hubei, China
- Groundbreaking: July 2011
- Construction started: 2014
- Completed: February 8, 2023

Height
- Architectural: 330 metres (1,082.7 ft)
- Tip: 330 metres (1,082.7 ft)

Technical details
- Floor count: 65

Wuhan Yangtze River Shipping Center is a supertall skyscraper in Wuhan, Hubei, China. It is 330 metres (1,082.7 ft) tall. Construction started in 2014, and the building was completed in 2023.

== See also ==
- List of tallest buildings in Wuhan
