= List of tallest buildings in Lanzhou =

Skyline of Lanzhou
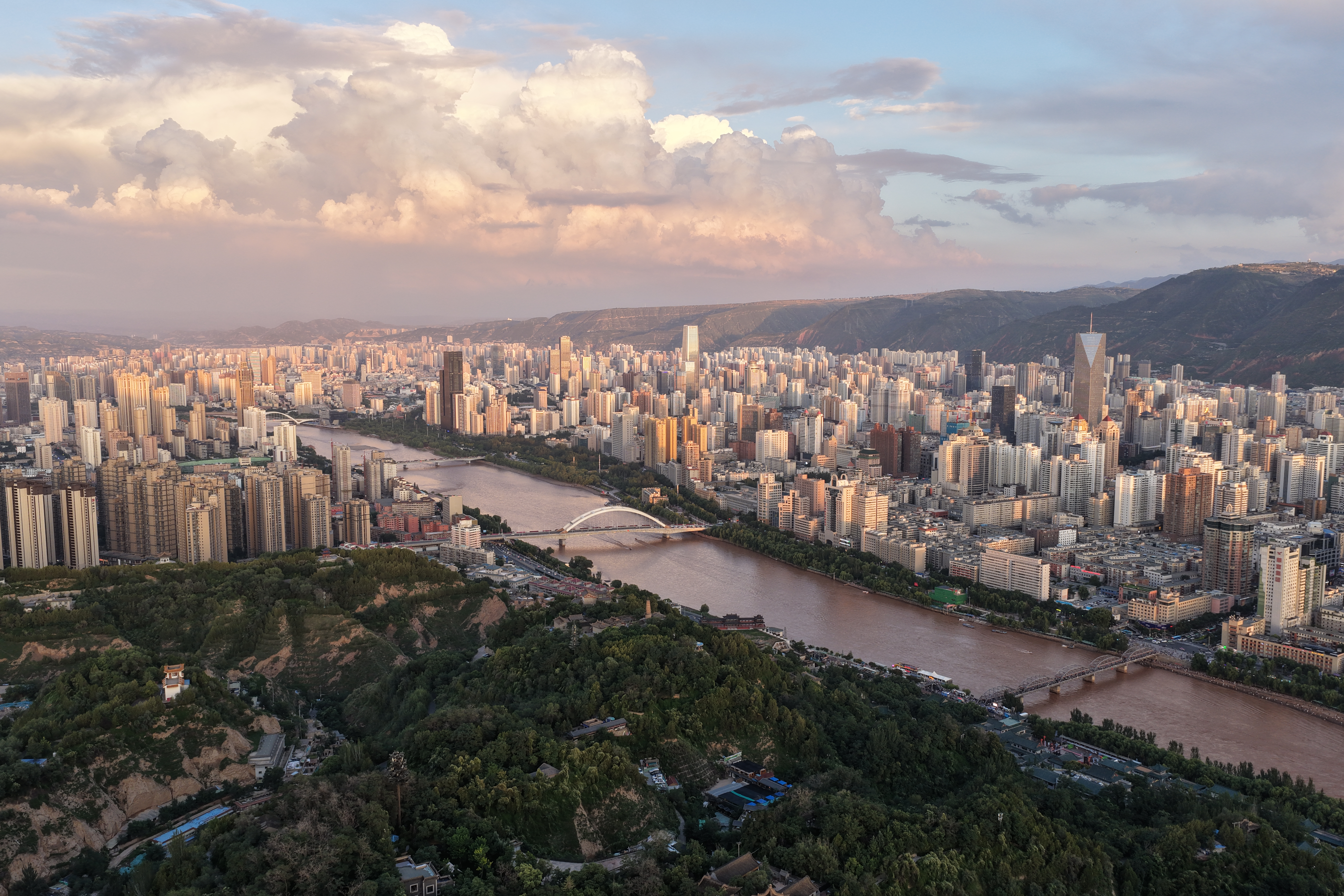
- The skyline of Lanzhou in 2025.
- Tallest building: Honglou Times Square (2018)
- Tallest building height: 313 m (1,027 ft)
- First 150 m+ building: Guofang Hotel (2008)

Number of tall buildings (2025)
- Taller than 150 m (492 ft): 19
- Taller than 200 m (656 ft): 10
- Taller than 300 m (984 ft): 1

Lanzhou is the largest and capital city of Gansu province in the northwestern region of China. It is the largest city on the Yellow River and has a population of 3,431,000 people as of 2025. The city has 10 high-rises which stand over 200 m (656 ft) tall. As of January 2026, the tallest building in Lanzhou is Honglou Times Square which stands 313 m (1,027 ft) tall.

== Cityscape ==
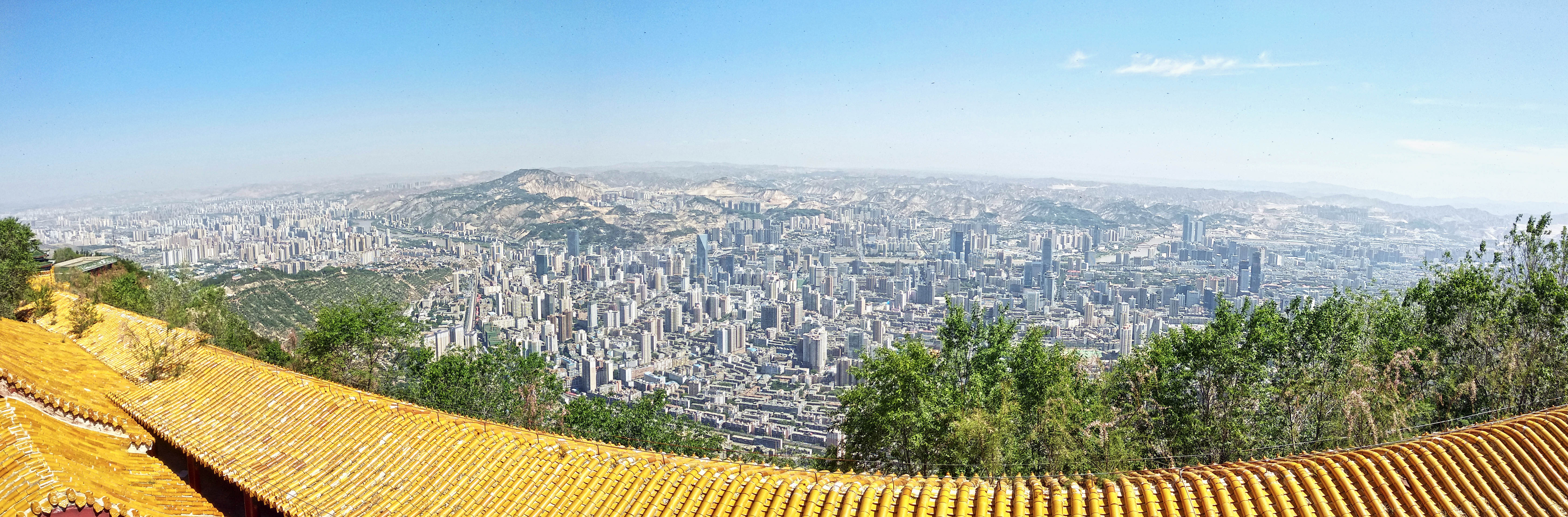
The skyline of Lanzhou seen from Lanshan Park.

== Tallest buildings ==
This list ranks completed buildings in Lanzhou which stand over 200 m (656 ft) tall. Spires and other architectural details are included in the height of a building, however, antennas are excluded.

Tallest building in Lanzhou upon completion

Rank	Name	Image	Location	Height	Floor Count	Year	Use	Notes
1	Honglou Times Square	红楼时代广场	36°03′14″N 103°49′30″E	313 m (1,027 ft)	56	2018	Hotel, Office	First building in Lanzhou to reach 300 m in height.
2	Lanzhou City Plaza Building 1		36°04′32″N 103°51′44″E	281 m (920 ft)	60	2018	Hotel, Office	
3	Fortune Jinmao Tower A	Fortune Jinmao Tower A Skyline Lanzhou August 2025 (cropped)	36°03′14″N 103°50′33″E	278 m (912 ft)	57	2020	Residential, Hotel, Office, Retail	
4	State Trade Center		36°05′41″N 103°42′34″E	239 m (785 ft)	48	2022	Hotel, Office	
5	New Victory Hotel		36°03′14″N 103°48′56″E	230 m (755 ft)	51	2015	Hotel	
6	Lanzhou Center Office Tower	兰州中心七里河区	36°04′06″N 103°46′17″E	229 m (751 ft)	40	2017	Office	
7	Lanzhou Shengda Financial Plaza B		36°03′12″N 103°51′17″E	220 m (722 ft)	51	2020	Hotel, Office, Retail	
8	Europe Sunshine City		36°04′01″N 103°50′22″E	216 m (709 ft)	50	2020	Residential	
9	Tianbao Times Square		36°03′37″N 103°48′50″E	210 m (688 ft)	53	2018	Office	
10	Jin Kai Rui Building		36°03′44″N 103°50′21″E	205 m (672 ft)	45	2018	Office	

== Tallest under construction ==
Rank	Name	Height	Floor Count	Year (est.)	Notes
1	Lanzhou Central Business District Project 4 Tower 1	277 m (909 ft)	47		
2	Lanzhou Hongsen Silver Beach Plaza	216 m (709 ft)	45	2025	

== Timeline of tallest buildings ==
Name	Image	Years as tallest	Height	Floors	Notes
Guofang Hotel	广场_-_panoramio_-_天王星_(2)	2008 - 2015	162 m (531 ft)	39	
New Victory Hotel		2015 - 2018	230 m (755 ft)	51	
Honglou Times Square	Honglou_Times_Square_201905	2018 - Present	313 m (1,027 ft)	56	
