= Honglou Times Square =

Supertall skyscraper in Lanzhou, Gansu, China

- 红楼时代广场
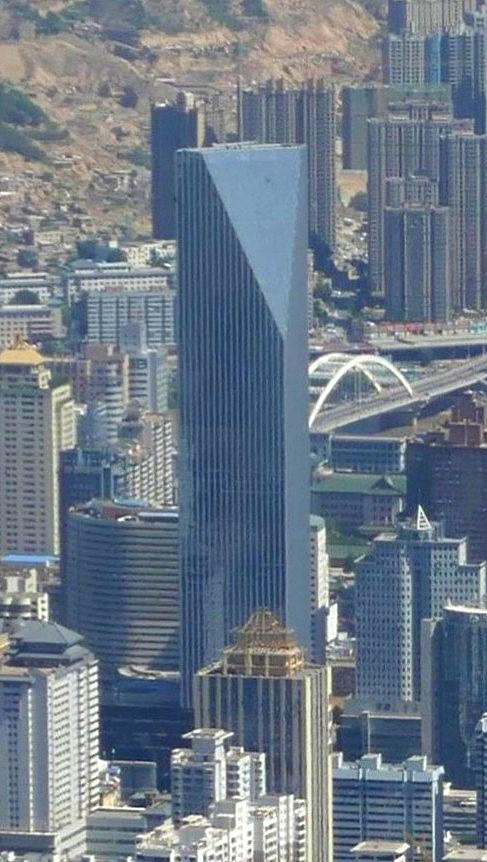
- Honglou Times Square in May 2019
- Interactive map of the Honglou Times Square area

General information
- Status: Completed
- Type: Office
- Location: 159 Qingyang Road, Chengguan District, Lanzhou, Gansu, China
- Coordinates: 36°03′14″N 103°49′27″E
- Construction started: April 7, 2012
- Completed: September 14, 2018

Height
- Architectural: 313 metres (1,026.9 ft)
- Tip: 313 metres (1,026.9 ft)
- Top floor: 246.2 metres (807.7 ft)
- Observatory: 240 metres (787.4 ft)

Technical details
- Floor count: 56
- Floor area: 134,000 m^{2}

Honglou Times Square (Chinese: 红楼时代广场) is a 313-metre (1,026.9 ft) tall skyscraper in Lanzhou, Gansu, China. Construction started in 2012 and was completed in 2018. It is the tallest building in Gansu.

The building was developed by the Lanzhou Minbai Group, a subsidiary of Zhejiang Honglou Group, at a cost of 2 billion yuan and constructed by Zhejiang Construction Group. On 13 April 2018, a fire broke out on the 11th floor while the building was still under construction.

The skyscraper has 59 floors in total, including 3 underground floors. On the 55th floor, at 240 m, there is a publicly accessible viewing area. In addition, there is a glass skywalk. The building is used for shopping malls, restaurants, entertainment, offices and hotels.

== Floor use ==
Floor	Use
-3, -2	Parking, utilities
-1	Supermarket
1-7	Shopping mall
8-14	Leisure and entertainment
15-37	Offices
38-53	Marriott Hotel
54-55	Observatory

== See also ==
- List of tallest buildings in China
- List of tallest buildings in Lanzhou
