= Baoneng Shenyang Global Financial Center =

Building in Shenyang, China

Baoneng Shenyang Global Financial Center 沈阳宝能环球金融中心
- Interactive map of the Baoneng Shenyang Global Financial Center 沈阳宝能环球金融中心 area

General information
- Status: Under Construction (Tower 1); Topped-out (Tower 2)
- Location: Shenyang, Liaoning, China
- Coordinates: 41.7790°N 123.4348°E
- Construction started: 2014
- Estimated completion: 2027
- Owner: Baoneng Group

Height
- Height: 388 m (1,273 ft) 328 m / 1,076 ft (Tower 2) 200 m / 656 ft (Towers 3 to 7)

Technical details
- Floor count: 75 (Tower 1) 80 (Tower 2) 56 (Towers 3 to 7)

Design and construction
- Architecture firm: Atkins
- Structural engineer: RBS, Shenzhen General Institute
- Main contractor: China Construction Third Engineering Bureau Corp.

Baoneng Shenyang Global Financial Center (Chinese: 沈阳宝能环球金融中心; pinyin: Shěnyáng Bǎonéng Huánqiú Jīnróng Zhōngxīn) is an under construction high-rise development located in Shenyang, Liaoning, China.

It consists of seven total buildings, with two being office buildings and the other five serving as apartment buildings. Although the residential towers were completed in 2018, the two office towers remain unfinished. Global Financial Center Tower 2, the 328-meter tower, is topped out at its full height and has been on-hold since 2022, but construction was resumed in December 2025 and will finish by 2027. The tallest building, the Global Financial Center Tower 1 is the building that has had the most difficulties out of the entire development. Originally planned to rise 568 metres (1,864 ft), construction reached nine floors, but was put on hold. Due to a ban in China on the construction of buildings over 500 meters (1,641 feet), the 568-meter design was abandoned and subsequently reduced in height to various heights before being scrapped entirely and completely redesigned. The redesigned Tower 1 is now expected to be 388 metres (1,273 ft) tall and its construction will finish in 2027.

== See also ==
- List of tallest buildings in Shenyang
