= List of tallest buildings in Wuhan =

Tall buildings in Wuhan
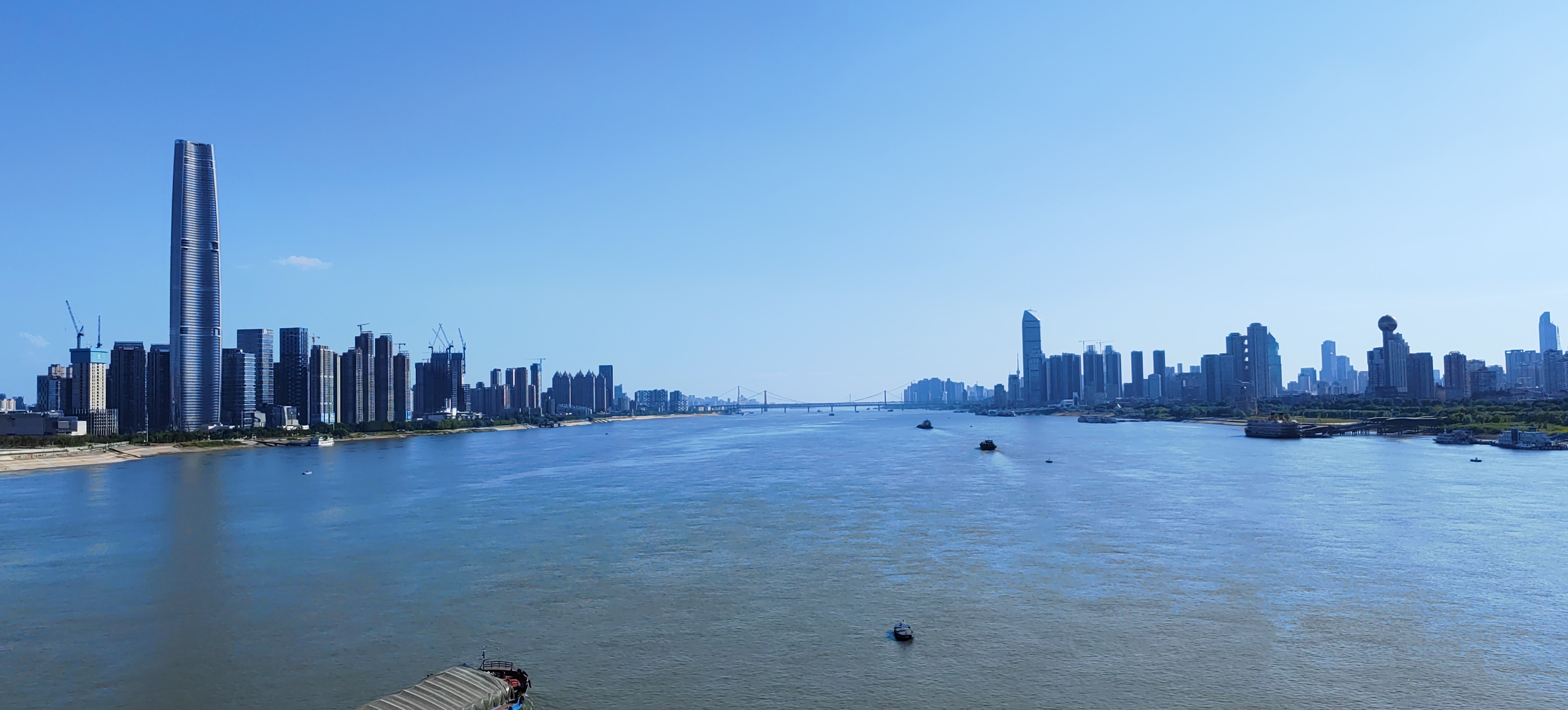
- Wuchang District, featuring Wuhan Greenland Center under construction on the left of the Yangtze
- Tallest building: Wuhan Greenland Center (2023)
- Tallest building height: 475.6 m (1,560 ft)
- First 150 m+ building: Truroll Plaza (1996)

Number of tall buildings
- Taller than 150 m (492 ft): 196 (2025) (7th)
- Taller than 200 m (656 ft): 73 (2025) (5th)
- Taller than 300 m (984 ft): 8 (2025) (5th)
- Taller than 400 m (1,312 ft): 2

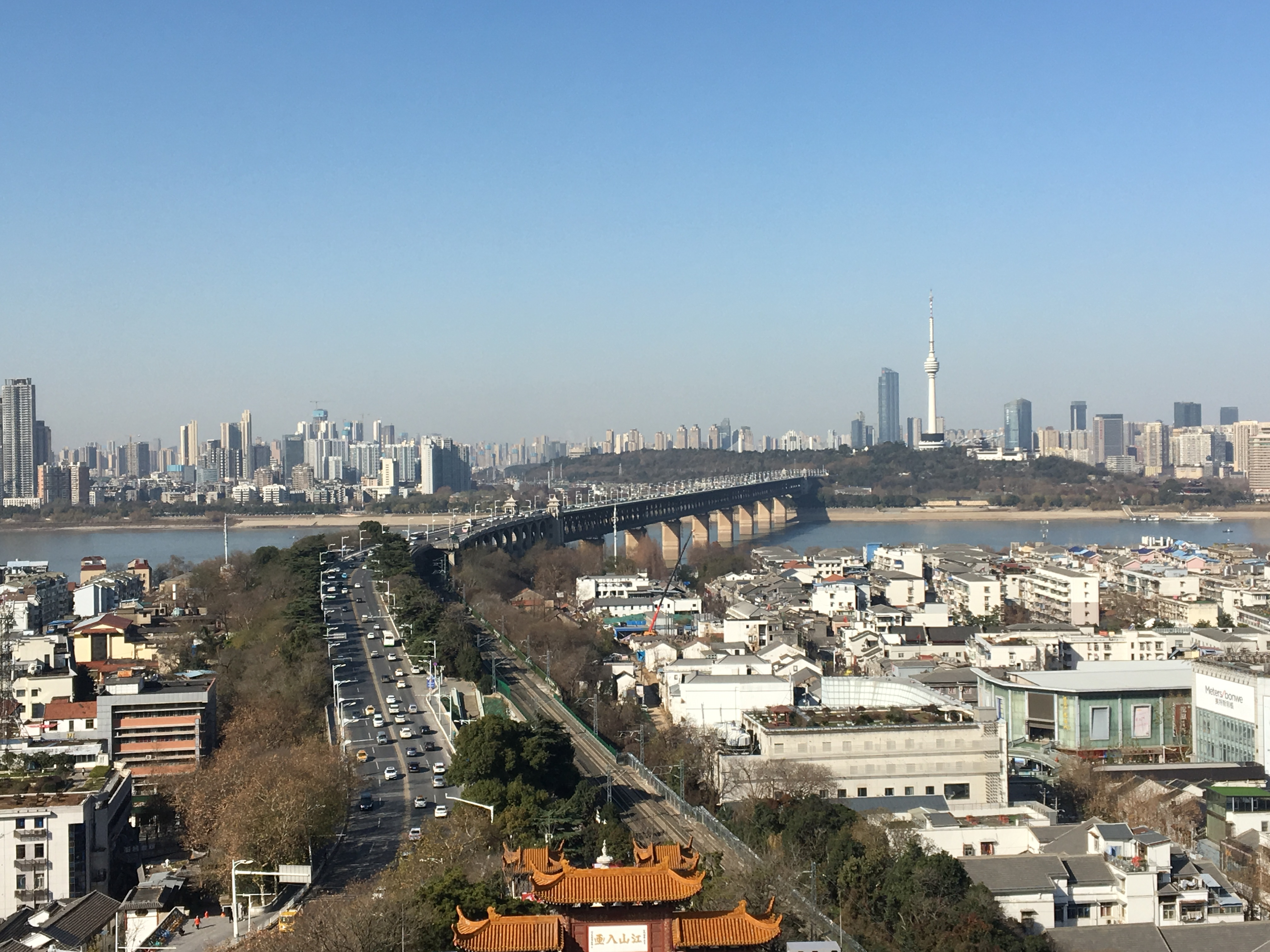
View of Wuhan over the Yangtze River Bridge in 2020

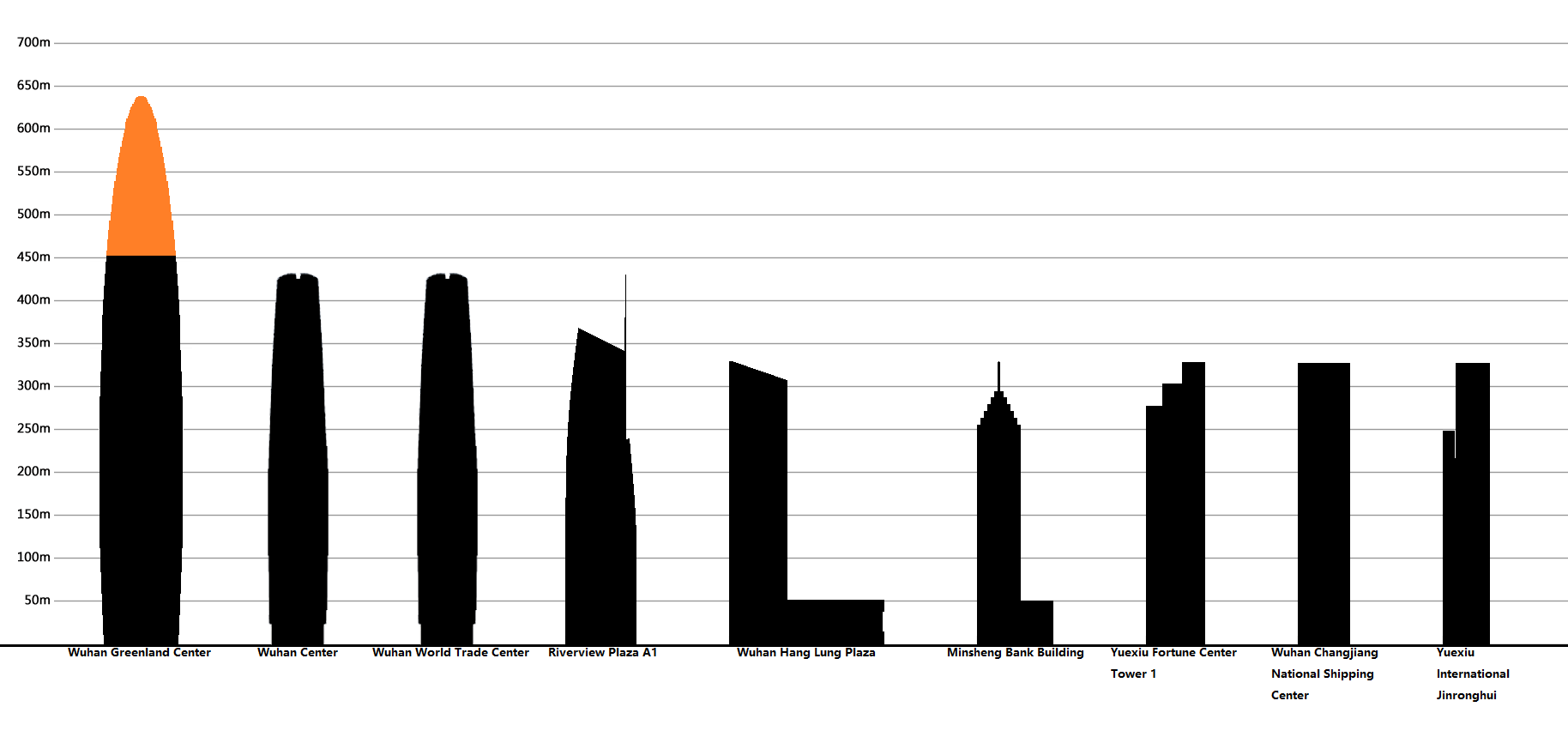
Diagram of Wuhan's tallest buildings in 2019

This list of tallest buildings in Wuhan ranks skyscrapers in the Chinese city of Wuhan, Hubei by height. Wuhan is the capital and largest city in Hubei, with a population of over 13 million people as of 2022 and an urban area population of over 10.3 million. Wuhan is the largest city in Central China and a major financial, economic, cultural, and transportation hub. Most of Wuhan's tallest buildings are located in the central districts of Jiang'an, Jianghan, Qiaokou and Wuchang, lining both sides of the Yangtze River.

Wuhan is one of the cities with the most tall buildings in the world; it has the seventh-most skyscrapers taller than 150 metres (492 feet), with 193 of them as of 2025. 71 skyscrapers rise above 200 m (656 ft) in height, the fifth most in the world. Wuhan has a total of seven completed supertall skyscrapers, the fifth-most in the world, which is tied with Chicago, Nanjing, and Shanghai. A further three are under construction. Since 2023, the tallest building in Wuhan has been the Wuhan Greenland Center, a supertall skyscraper that reaches a height of 476 m (1,650 ft). It was originally planned to reach a height of 636 m (2,087), earning it the status of a megatall skyscraper, but was redesigned owing to airspace restrictions.

Wuhan's earliest skyscrapers were built in the late 1990s. The Wuhan World Trade Tower, built in 1998 at a height of 273 m (896 ft), was the tallest building in Wuhan for ten years until 2008, upon the completion of Wuhan's first supertall skyscraper, the Minsheng Bank Building, at 331 m (1,086 ft) in height. During the 2010s, the rate of skyscraper construction accelerated significantly. Despite being the starting point of the COVID-19 pandemic, the rate of construction increased further. Wuhan is mainland China's fourth-largest skyline and the largest in Central China.

== Tallest buildings ==
This lists ranks Wuhan skyscrapers that stand at least 200 m (656 ft) tall, based on standard height measurement. This includes spires and architectural details but does not include antenna masts. Existing structures are included for ranking purposes based on present height.

Was the tallest building in Wuhan upon completion

Rank	Building	Image	Height	Floors	Use	Year	Notes
1	Wuhan Greenland Center		475.6 m	101	Mixed-use	2023	Tallest building in Wuhan
2	Wuhan Center		443.1 m	88	Mixed-use	2019	
3	Riverview Plaza A1		376 m	73	Office	2021	Tallest office-only building in Wuhan
4	Minsheng Bank Building		331 m	68	Office	2008	Minsheng Bank Building was the tallest building in Wuhan when it was completed in 2008. It retained the title until Wuhan Center surpassed it in 2014
5	Yuexiu Fortune Center Tower 1		330 m	68	Office	2017	Tallest building in Qiaokou District.
6	Wuhan Yangtze River Shipping Center		330 m	65	Mixed-use	2023	
7	Heartland 66 Office Tower		320.7 m	59	Office	2020	
8	Tianyue Xinchen Tower 1		275.3 m	43	Office	2018	
9	Wuhan World Trade Tower		273 m	60	Office	1998	
10	Alibaba Central China Headquarters Tower 1		272.5 m	52	Mixed-use	2024	
11	Wuhan CFD Time Finance Center		264.7 m	47	Office	2016	
12	Shanhe Enterprise Tower		264 m	56	Mixed-use	2014	The tower was formerly named PTJ International Finance Center.
13	Puyang Building		263.2 m	58	Office	2023	
14	Wuhan China Resources Center Tower 1		260 m	55	Office	2023	
15	Ping An Building		251 m	57	Office	1997	Formerly named Jiali Plaza.
16	Wanda Zun B		245.8 m	58	Office	2018	
17	Changjiang Media Tower		243 m	49	Office	2017	
18	Greatwall Tower 1		240 m	40	Office	2015	
19	Wuhan Xibeihu International Finance Center		240 m	45	Office	2022	
20	Wuhan International Financial Plaza		237 m	51	Office	2017	
21	Wuhan International Trade Center A		232.8 m	45	Office	2020	
22	1818 Center		232 m	42	Mixed-use	2015	
23	Huangpu International Center		229.1 m	47	Office	2024	
24	Sanyang Road Station Tower 1		229 m	46	Office	2022	
25	Changchenghui Tower 1		228 m	43	Mixed-use	2016	
26	Wuhan Euro-Asia Plaza Office Building		228 m	45	Office	2017	Tallest building in Dongxihu District.
27	China City B1		227.7 m	51	Office	2016	
28	Wuhan Royal Lake Hanyin 1#		225.9 m	60	Residential	2024	
29	Wuhan Royal Lake Hanyin 2#		225.9 m	60	Residential	2024	
30	Wuhan International Trade Center B		225 m	45	Mixed-use	2018	
31	Paradise Walk Wuhan Jiangchen Tower 1		223.5 m	50	Office	2022	
32	Optical Valley New World Center A		222.1 m	44	Office	2017	
33	Hanzheng Street Project Tower 1		220 m	54	Office	2021	
34	Wuhan Kunyu International Center		220 m	51	Office	2023	
35	Wuhan Hong Kong Center A		220 m	47	Office	2023	
36	Wuhan Chenggong Tower		220 m	45	Office	2022	
37	China Merchants One River Jingcheng Tower 1		220 m	47	Office	2024	
38	Guangdong Development Bank Building		218.5 m	51	Office	2014	
39	Sunac Wangjiang Mansion Tower 11		217.5 m	43	Office	2024	
40	Jointown Pharmaceutical Headquarters		213 m	47	Office	2024	
41	Bank of China Hubei Province Headquarters		212.4 m	42	Office	2019	
42	New World Trade Tower		212 m	55	Office	2003	
43	Vanke Future Center East Tower		211.9 m	48	Mixed-use	2021	
44	Poly Cultural Plaza		211.8 m	46	Office	2012	Has been given the nicknames of "the Giant Chair" and "the Alpaca Building"
45	Zhejiang International Building		211.6 m	48	Office	2014	
46	Sanyang Road Station Tower 2		211.4 m	46	Office	2023	
47	Wuhan Evergrande City Building 2		211.1 m	55	Mixed-use	2019	
48	Greenland International Expo Fortune Centre		211 m	43	Office	2022	
49	Jinyinhu Building		210 m	47	Office	2022	
50	Chensheng International Center Tower 1		210 m	46	Office	2024	
51	Wuhan Evergrande City Building 1		209.5 m	43	Office	2018	
52	Rongqiao Tianyu Centre		208.5 m	43	Office	2024	
53	Wuhan Times Square Tower 1		208 m	56	Multiple	2007	
54	Jian Yin Tower A		208 m	50	Office	1997	
55	New Times Business Center		208 m	48	Mixed-use	2007	
56	Hanjiang International Tower		207 m	41	Office	2014	
57	Wuhan Ruichuang Center #45		206.2 m	45	Office	2016	
58	Merchants Jiangshan Fenghua Tower 1		203.8 m	62	Residential	2023	
59	Merchants Jiangshan Fenghua Tower 2		203.8 m	62	Residential	2023	
60	Hubei Radio & Television Media Centre		203.5 m	40	Office	2024	
61	Wuhan Evergrande Riverside Center Tower 1		203 m	58	Office	2017	
62	Xinhua Tower		203 m	35	Office	2022	
63	Greentown Jindi Fengqi Tinglan Tower 8		202.9 m	58	Residential	2023	
64	Greentown Jindi Fengqi Tinglan Tower 9		202.9 m	58	Residential	2023	
65	Chang Hang Building		202 m	42	Office	2001	
66	New World Phase III		202 m	36	Mixed-use	2019	
67	New Binkai Han City Tower K3-1		202 m (Note: Height is an estimate.)	59	Residential	2024	
68	Zhongnan Research and Design Center		200.5 m	43	Office	2024	
69	DSM International Center Tower 3		200 m	37	Office	2018	
70	Gezhouba Nanda Tiandi		200 m	42	Office	2018	
71	China Oceanwide Fortune Plaza		200 m	46	Office	2016	

== Tallest under construction or proposed ==
=== Under construction ===
This list ranks skyscrapers under construction in Wuhan that are expected to be at least 200 m (656 ft) m tall as of October 2026, based on standard height measurement. The Year column indicates the expected year of completion.

Building	Height	Floors	Use	Year	Notes
Wuhan Chow Tai Fook Finance Centre	475 m	84	Office	2029	
Great River Center	400 m	82	Office	2026	
Yuexiu Global Financial Center	330 m	68	Office	2025	
Huarong Three Town Center Office Building	273.8 m	56	Office	2026	
Taikang Online Headquarters Tower 1	270.8 m	51	Office	2026	
Guohua Financial Center Tower 2	269 m	63	Office	2026	
Taikang Online Headquarters Tower 2	261.7 m	48	Office	2026	
New Hope Central China Regional Headquarters Main Tower	250 m	56	Mixed-use	2026	
Greenland Hanzheng Center Tower 2	249.8 m	54	Office	2025	
Greenland Hanzheng Center Tower 1	249.8 m	52	Office	2025	
Ping An Happiness Center	245.2 m	50	Office	2025	
Yujing Star City Office Tower 1	240.6 m	51	Office	2025	
Taikang Online Headquarters Tower 3	238.6 m	45	Office	2025	
Yangtze River Coastal Railway Company Headquarters Tower 1	229.8 m	43	Office	2025	
Poly Binjiang Plaza Tower 1	228.9 m	54	Office	2025	
Wuhan Royal Lake Hanyin 6#	223.4 m	60	Residential	2026	
HIID Headquarters Tower 2	220 m	41	Office	2025	
Hubei Trading Industry Headquarters A	220 m	41	Office	2025	
Wuhan Headquarters of China Construction Third Engineering Bureau	211 m	43	Office	2025	
Mingyue Jiangwan Tower 6	205.5 m	63	Residential	2025	
Mingyue Jiangwan Tower 5	205.5 m	63	Residential	2025	
Huarong Three Town Center Tower 2	205.3 m	62	Residential	2025	
New Hope Central China Regional Headquarters Auxiliary Tower	200 m	47	Office	2026	
Changtou Hankou Office Tower	200 m	44	Office	2025	
