= Shanghai Shimao Festival City =

Supertall skyscraper in Shanghai, China

- 上海世茂广场
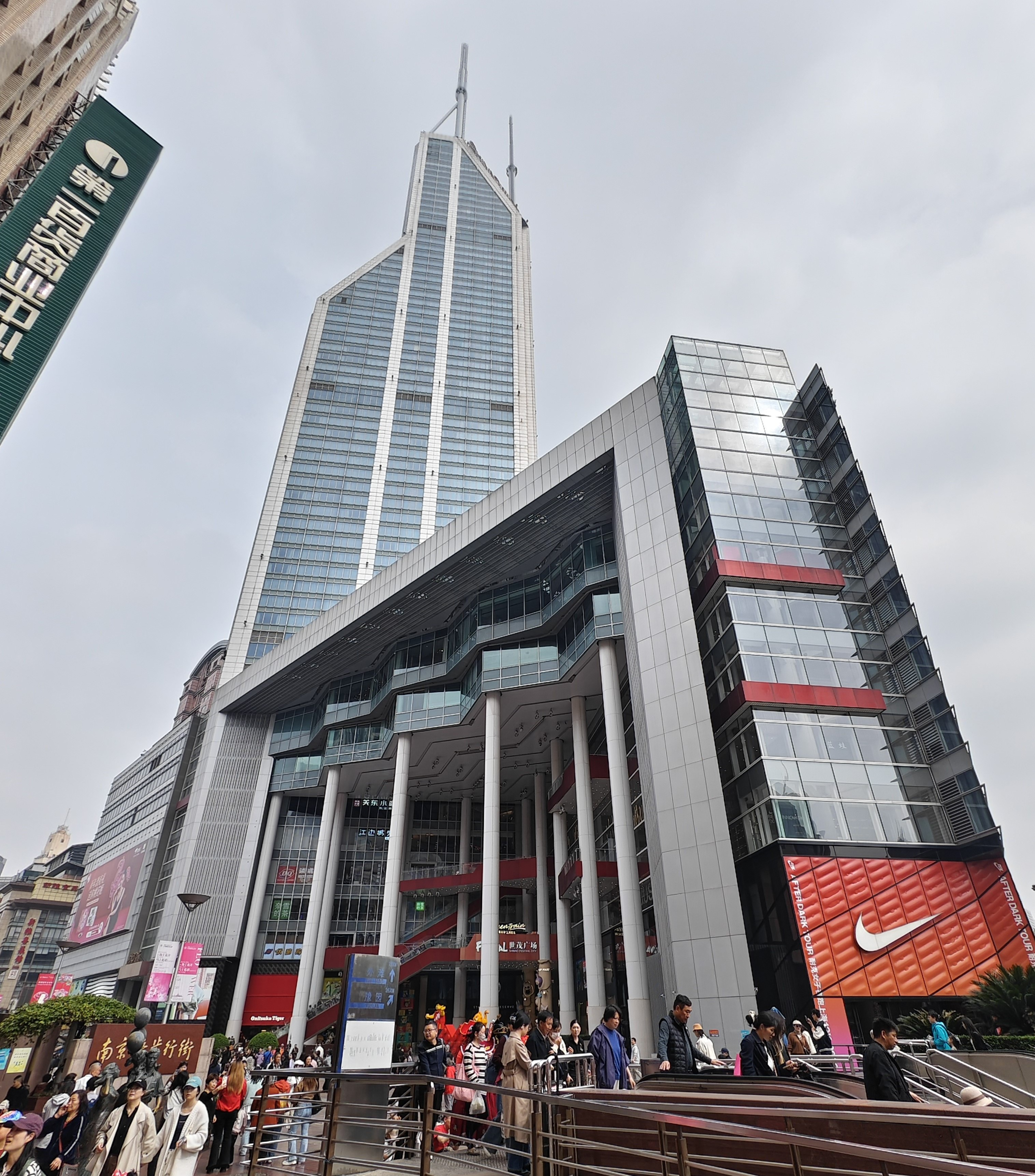
- Shanghai Shimao Festival City in 2026
- Interactive map of the Shanghai Shimao Festival City area

General information
- Status: Completed
- Type: Hotel, Retail
- Location: Huangpu District, Shanghai
- Coordinates: 31°14′11″N 121°28′17″E
- Construction started: October 2001
- Completed: September 2006

Height
- Architectural: 333.3 m (1,094 ft)
- Roof: 256 m (840 ft)
- Top floor

Technical details
- Floor count: 60
- Floor area: 91,600 m^{2} (986,000 sq ft)

Design and construction
- Architects: Ingenhoven Overdiek und Partner, East China Architectural Design & Research Institute Co. Ltd.

Shanghai Shimao Festival City (Chinese: 上海世茂广场), previously known as Shimao International Plaza (Chinese: 上海世茂国际广场), is a 333.3 m (1,094 ft) tall skyscraper of 60 stories in Shanghai's Huangpu District. It was completed in 2006 under the design of Ingenhoven, Overdiek und Partner, East China Architecture and Design Institute.

Shanghai Shimao Festival City has two spires on its top, which make its total construction height to 333.3 metres. Most of the building (the upper 48 floors) houses, Conrad Shanghai, a luxury hotel with 728 rooms known as Le Royal Méridien Shanghai prior to January 1, 2022. The building also includes a 9 floor shopping mall and 3 floors of exclusive clubs.

Shanghai Shimao Group bought the original developer of the tower, Wan Xiang Group, in 2001 and the name of the building was changed.

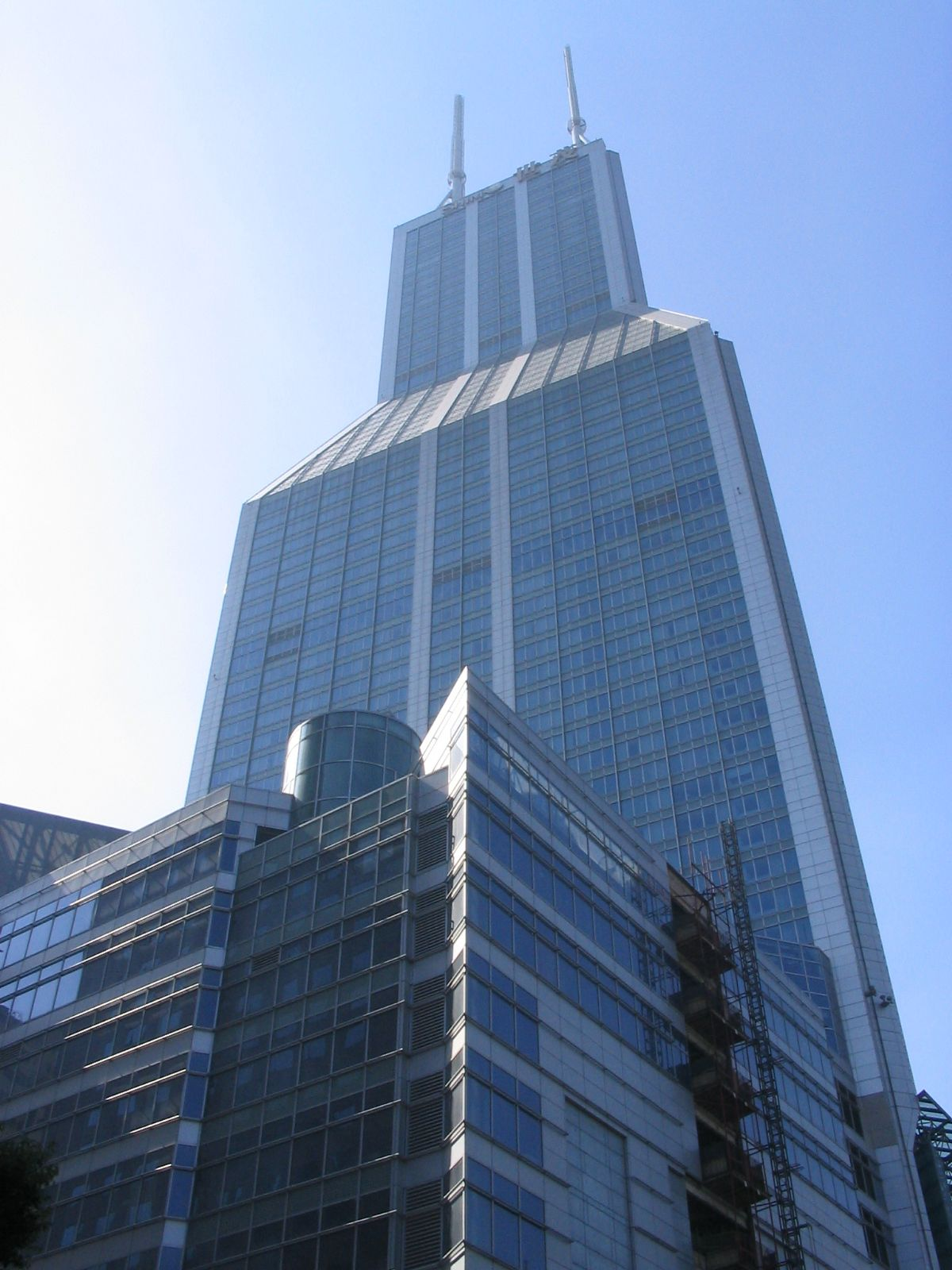
The eastern façade of the Shanghai Shimao Festival City

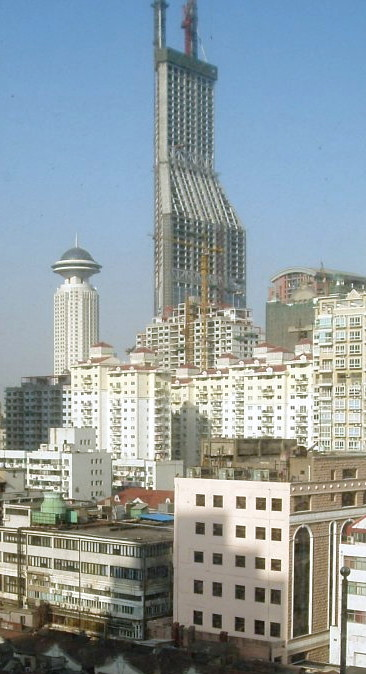
Under construction in 2005

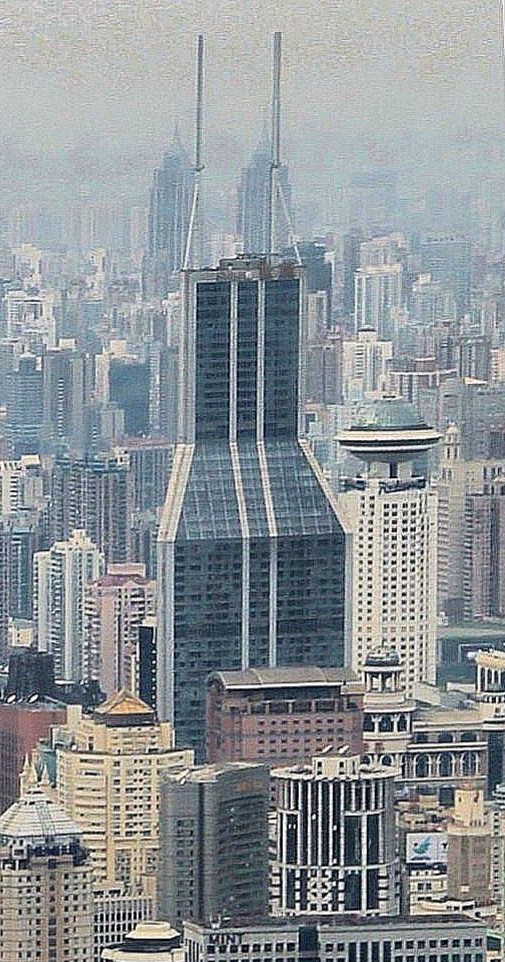
The building in 2015

== See also ==
- List of tallest buildings in Shanghai
