= List of tallest buildings in Shenyang =

Tall buildings in Shenyang
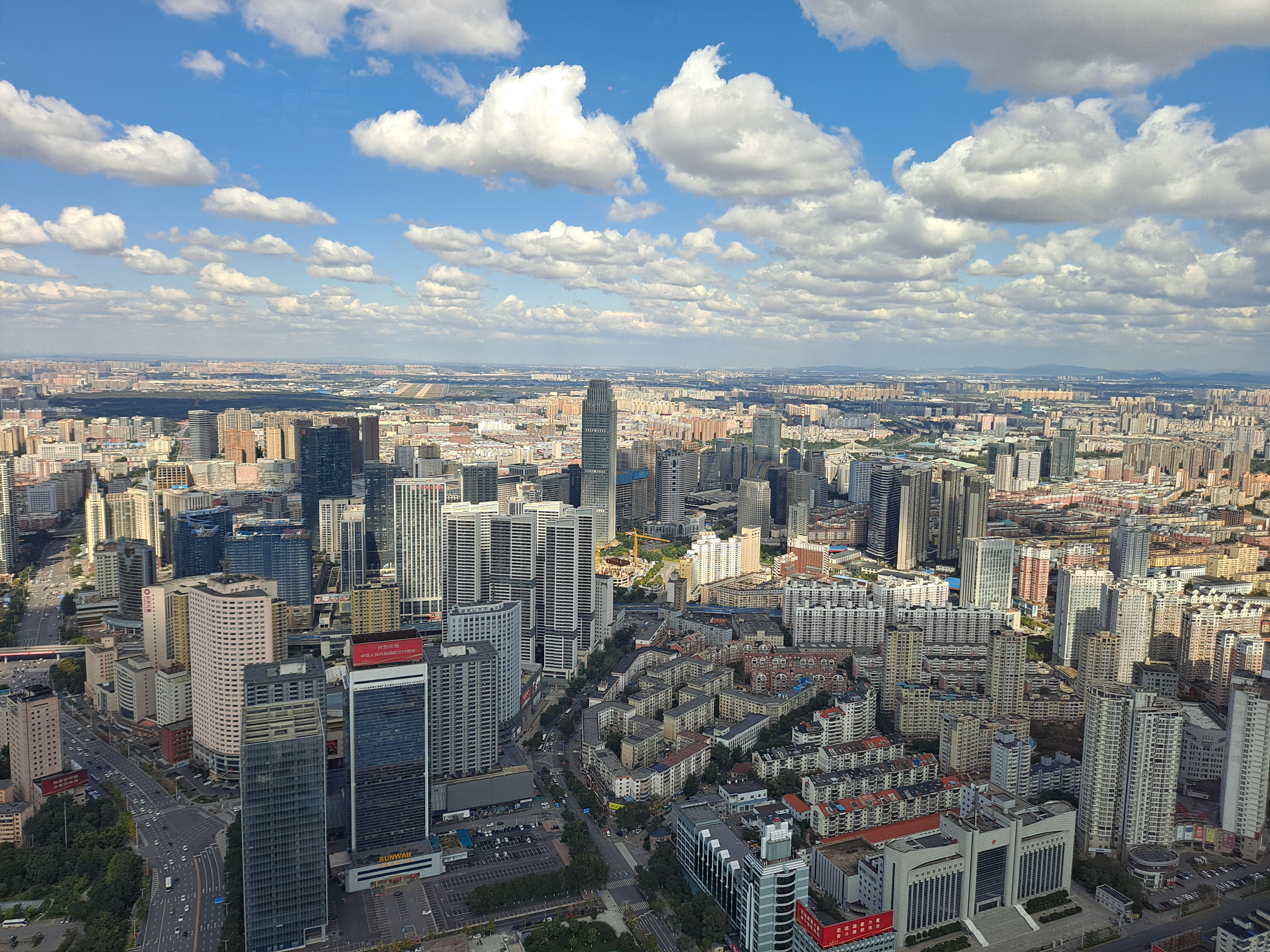
- Skyline of Shenyang in 2024
- Tallest building: Forum 66 Tower 1 (2015)
- Tallest building height: 350.6 m (1,110 ft)
- First 150 m+ building: Northeast Electric Power Mansion (1997)

Number of tall buildings
- Taller than 150 m (492 ft): 101 (2025)
- Taller than 200 m (656 ft): 30 (2025)
- Taller than 300 m (984 ft): 3 (2025)

This list of tallest buildings in Shenyang ranks skyscrapers in Shenyang, China by height. Shenyang is the capital and largest city of the province of Liaoning, as well as the largest city in Northeast China, with a population of 9.1 million as of the 2020 census and an urban population of 7.9 million.

Shenyang is home to 101 completed skyscrapers that reach a height of 150 m (492 ft) or greater. Of these, 30 of them are over 200 m (656 ft) in height. A majority of these are formed from buildings in two complexes: Shengjing Finance Plaza, and Baoneng Shenyang Global Financial Center. Shenyang ranks as the city with the 18th most skyscrapers in the world, and the 7th largest skyline in mainland China. Like many other major Chinese cities, Shenyang underwent a large building boom in the 2010s, having built only 5 skyscrapers above 150 meters before 2010.

The tallest building in Shenyang is Forum 66 Tower 1, a supertall skyscraper with a height of 350.6 meters (1,150 ft) built in 2015. It is one of three supertall skyscrapers in Shenyang. The under construction Shenyang International Center Tower 1 is expected to take the title of the tallest building in the city when it is complete in 2027, with a height of 366 meters. Two more supertall skyscrapers are under construction as of 2026: Golden Corridor 22-1 Project Tower 1, and Shenyang International Center Tower 2. When these projects are completed, Shenyang will be home to six supertall skyscrapers.

== Tallest buildings ==
This lists ranks Shenyang skyscrapers that stand at least 200 m (656 ft) tall, based on standard height measurement. This includes spires and architectural details but does not include antenna masts. Existing structures are included for ranking purposes based on present height.

Was the tallest building in Shenyang upon completion

| Rank | Name | Image | Height (m) | Floors | Usage | Year | Notes |
|---|---|---|---|---|---|---|---|
| 1 | Forum 66 Tower 1 | | 350.6 | 68 | Hotel/Office | 2015 | |
| 2 | Huaqiang Golden Corridor City Plaza Main Tower | | 327 | 66 | Hotel/Office | 2023 | |
| 3 | Moi Center Tower A | | 311 | 75 | Hotel/Office | 2014 | |
| 4 | SunnyWorld Center | | 260 | 59 | Hotel/Office | 2014 | |
| 5 | Longemont Asia Pacific Center Tower A | | 245.2 | 56 | Office | 2013 | |
| 6 | Longemont Asia Pacific Center Tower B | | 245.2 | 56 | Office | 2013 | |
| 7 | Lingxi Center Tower 1 | | 242.1 | 47 | Hotel/Office | 2024 | |
| 8 | North Yoker Plaza Tower A | | 228.9 | 45 | Office | 2016 | |
| 9 | Shenyang New World Center Tower C | | 224.4 | 57 | Serviced Apartments | 2017 | |
| 10 | Shenyang Royal Wan Xin International Mansion Tower A | | 219 m | 45 | Hotel | 2009 | |
| 11 | Shenyang New World Center Tower E | | 217.8 | 55 | Serviced Apartments | 2017 | |
| 12 | Summer Palace Tower A | | 208 | 41 | Office | 2015 | |
| 13 | Shengjing Finance Plaza R12 | | 204.8 | 60 | Residential | 2018 | |
| 14 | Shengjing Finance Plaza R11 | | 204.8 | 60 | Residential | 2018 | |
| 15 | Shengjing Finance Plaza R10 | | 204.8 | 60 | Residential | 2018 | |
| 16 | Shengjing Finance Plaza R9 | | 204.8 | 60 | Residential | 2020 | |
| 17 | Shengjing Finance Plaza R8 | | 204.8 | 60 | Residential | 2020 | |
| 18 | Shengjing Finance Plaza R7 | | 204.8 | 60 | Residential | 2020 | |
| 19 | Shengjing Finance Plaza R6 | | 204.8 | 60 | Residential | 2020 | |
| 20 | Shengjing Finance Plaza R5 | | 204.8 | 60 | Residential | 2020 | |
| 21 | Shengjing Finance Plaza R4 | | 204.8 | 60 | Residential | 2020 | |
| 22 | Shengjing Finance Plaza R2 | | 204.8 | 60 | Residential | 2020 | |
| 23 | Shengjing Finance Plaza R1 | | 204.8 | 60 | Residential | 2020 | |
| 24 | Eton Shenyang Center #5 | | 202.6 | 60 | Residential | 2016 | |
| 25 | Hongyun Building Tower A | | 201.2 | 44 | Office | 2016 | |
| 26 | Baoneng Shenyang Global Financial Centre Tower 7 | | 200 | 56 | Residential | 2018 | |
| 27 | Baoneng Shenyang Global Financial Centre Tower 6 | | 200 | 56 | Residential | 2018 | |
| 28 | Baoneng Shenyang Global Financial Centre Tower 5 | | 200 | 56 | Residential | 2018 | |
| 29 | Baoneng Shenyang Global Financial Centre Tower 4 | | 200 | 56 | Residential | 2018 | |
| 30 | Baoneng Shenyang Global Financial Centre Tower 3 | | 200 | 56 | Residential | 2018 | |

== Tallest under construction or proposed ==
=== Under construction ===
The following table ranks skyscrapers that are under construction in Shenyang that are expected to be at least 200 m (656 ft) tall as of 2026, based on standard height measurement. The "Year" column indicates the expected year of completion. Buildings that are on hold are not included.

| Name | Height (m) | Floors | Year | Notes |
|---|---|---|---|---|
| Shenyang International Center Tower 1 | 388 | 75 | 2027 | Office |
| Golden Corridor 22-1 Project Tower 1 | 330 | 71 | 2026 | Office |
| Shenyang International Center Tower 2 | 328 | 80 | 2027 | Hotel / Office |
| Golden Corridor 22-1 Project Tower 2 | 210 | 65 | 2026 | Office |
