= Heartland 66 Office Tower =

Supertall skyscraper in Wuhan, Hubei, China

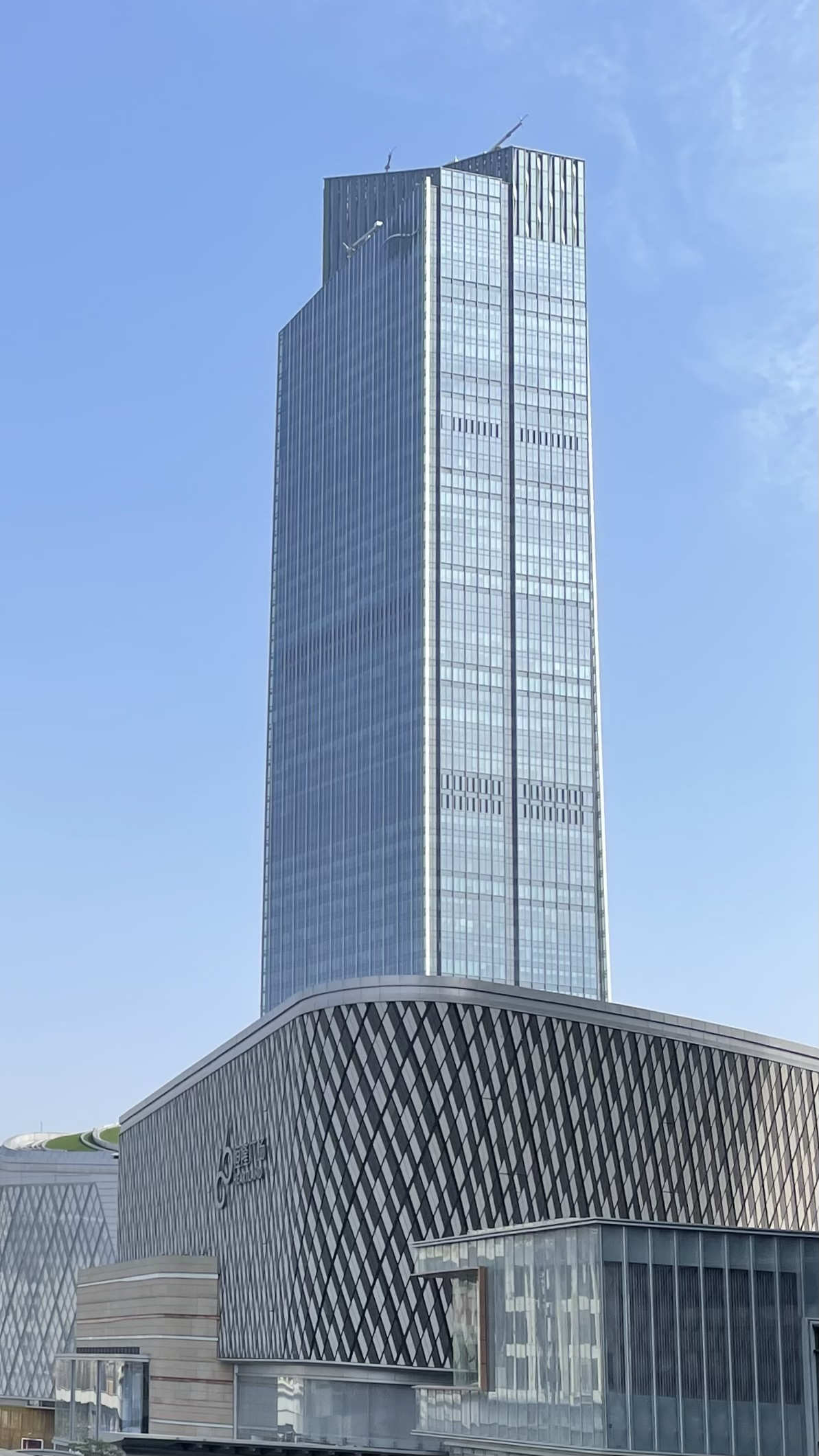
- Interactive map of the Heartland 66 Office Tower area

General information
- Status: Completed
- Location: Wuhan, China
- Coordinates: 30°34′50.5″N 114°16′12.8″E
- Groundbreaking: 2013
- Construction started: 2015
- Completed: 2020

Height
- Architectural: 320.9 m (1,053 ft)

Technical details
- Floor count: 61

Heartland 66 Office Tower is an office supertall skyscraper in Wuhan, Hubei, China. Built between 2015 and 2020, the tower stands at 320.9 m (1,053 ft) tall with 61 floors and is the current 7th tallest building in Wuhan.

== See also ==
- List of tallest buildings in Wuhan
- List of tallest buildings in China
