= Wuhan Greenland Center =

Supertall skyscraper in Wuhan, Hubei, China

- 武汉绿地中心
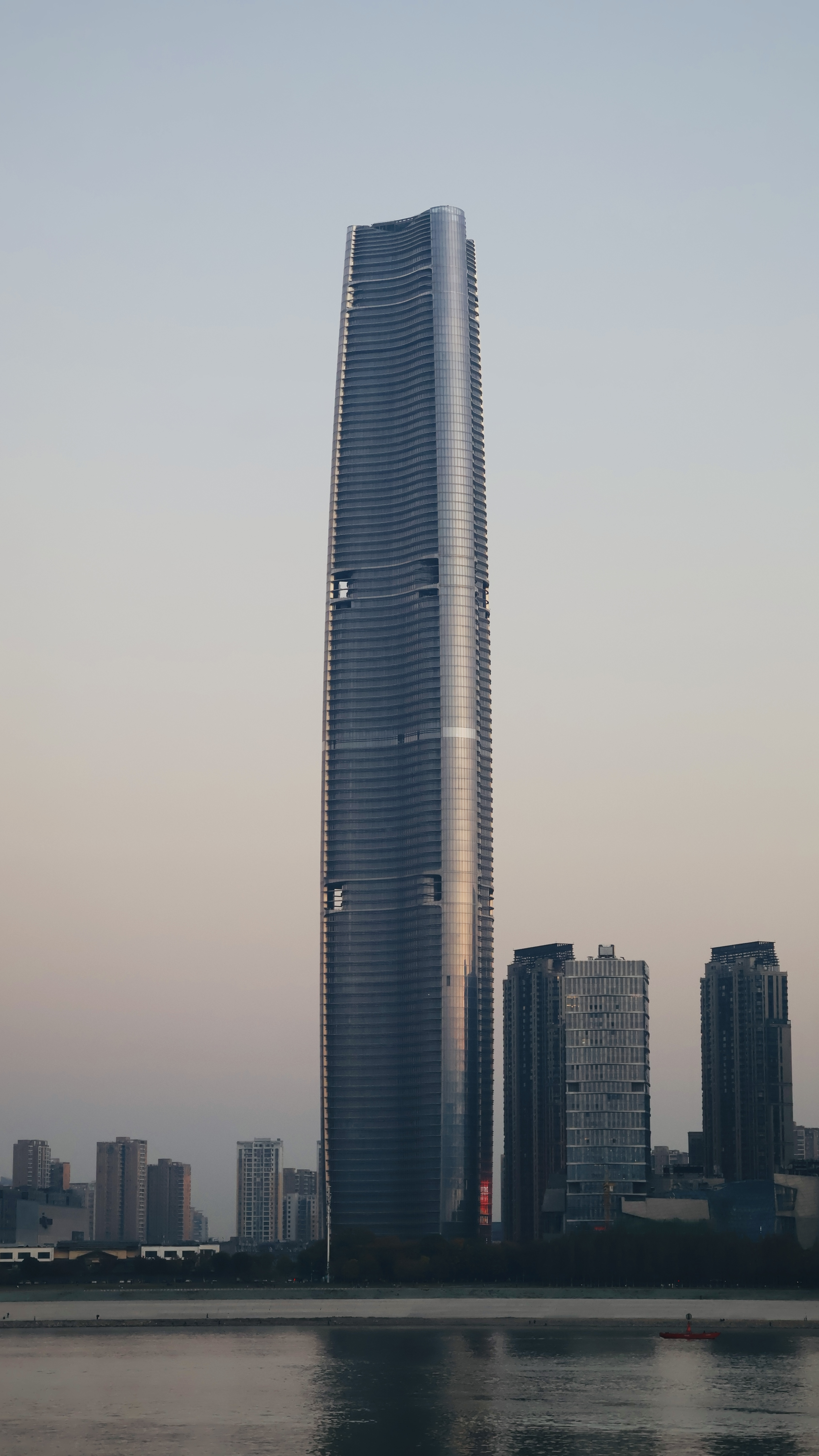
- Alternative names: Greenland Center, WGC

General information
- Status: Completed
- Type: Hotel / serviced apartments / office
- Architectural style: Modern
- Location: Wuhan, Hubei, Linjiang Avenue, China
- Construction started: 28 June 2012
- Completed: 2022
- Cost: $4.5 billion
- Owner: Wuhan Greenland Bin Jiang Property

Height
- Height: 476 m (1,562 ft)

Technical details
- Material: Composite
- Floor count: 101 (+6 below ground)
- Floor area: 303,275 m^{2} (3,264,420 sq ft)
- Lifts/elevators: 84

Design and construction
- Architect: Adrian Smith + Gordon Gill Architecture
- Architecture firm: Adrian Smith + Gordon Gill Architecture; ECADI
- Developer: Greenland Group
- Structural engineer: Thornton Tomasetti
- Services engineer: PositivEnergy Practice; Parsons Brinckerhoff
- Civil engineer: Prism Engineering
- Main contractor: China State Construction Engineering; Greenland Group

Other information
- Parking: 1051

Wuhan Greenland Center is a 476-metre (1,562 ft) supertall Skyscraper in Wuhan, China. It is the ninth-tallest building in China and the fourteenth-tallest building in the world. The tower was originally planned to be 636 metres (2,087 ft), but was redesigned mid-construction due to airspace regulations so its height does not exceed 502 metres (1,650 ft) above ground level.

The building was designed by Adrian Smith + Gordon Gill Architecture in conjunction with Thornton Tomasetti Engineers won the design competition to build the tower for Greenland Group, a real estate developer owned by the Shanghai city government. Construction started in 2012 and had been put on-hold numerous times following the redesign in mid-2017 ranging from financial problems, to the COVID-19 pandemic. The building was structurally topped-out in 28 January 2019 and completed in 2022. The Wuhan Greenland Center is Central China's tallest building with a cost of US$4.5 billion, mostly due to the number of times it had been put on-hold.

== Original design ==
The original plan for the building was to have it rise 636 metres (2,087 ft), surpassing the Shanghai Tower by only 4.3 metres (14 ft) and the Tokyo Skytree by 2.1 metres (7 ft), making it the second tallest man-made structure in the world. The tower was also supposed to have 126 floors, the second most of any building in the world, as well. When the Wuhan Greenland Center reached its 96th floor, construction was halted due to airspace restrictions which led to its subsequent redesign to a 476-metre (1,562 ft) building instead of a 636-metre (2,087 ft) building. The Wuhan Greenland Center is currently the 14th tallest building in the world.

== Construction gallery ==
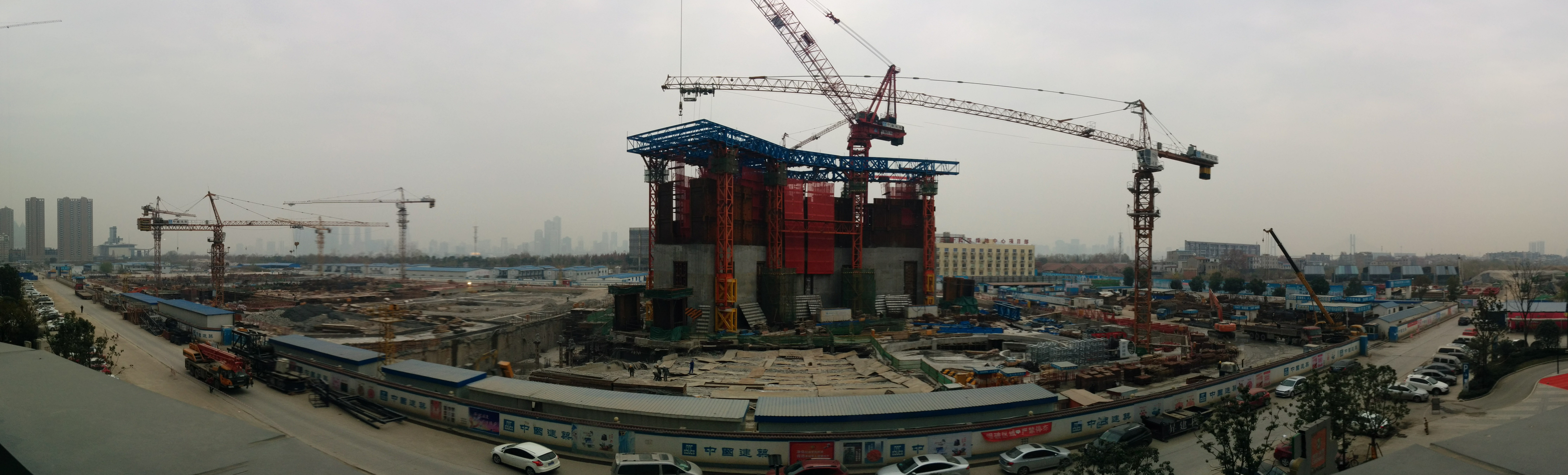
Construction Site

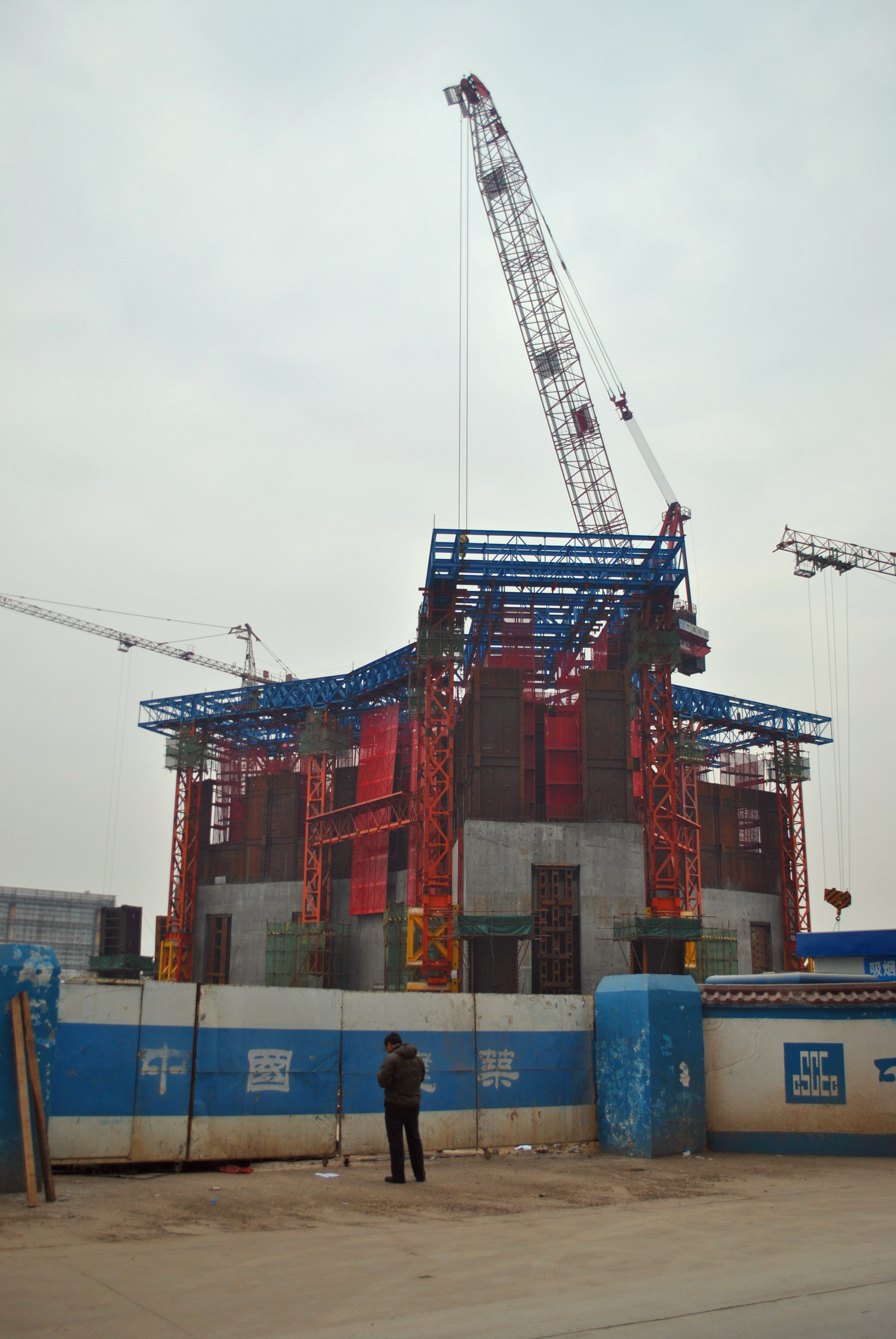
Main tower in 2014

== See also ==
- Goldin Finance 117
- Baoneng Shenyang Global Financial Center
- List of tallest buildings in Wuhan
- List of tallest buildings in China
