= Yuexiu Fortune Center Tower 1 =

Supertall skyscraper in Wuhan, Hubei, China

Coordinates: 30.5942°N 114.2732°E

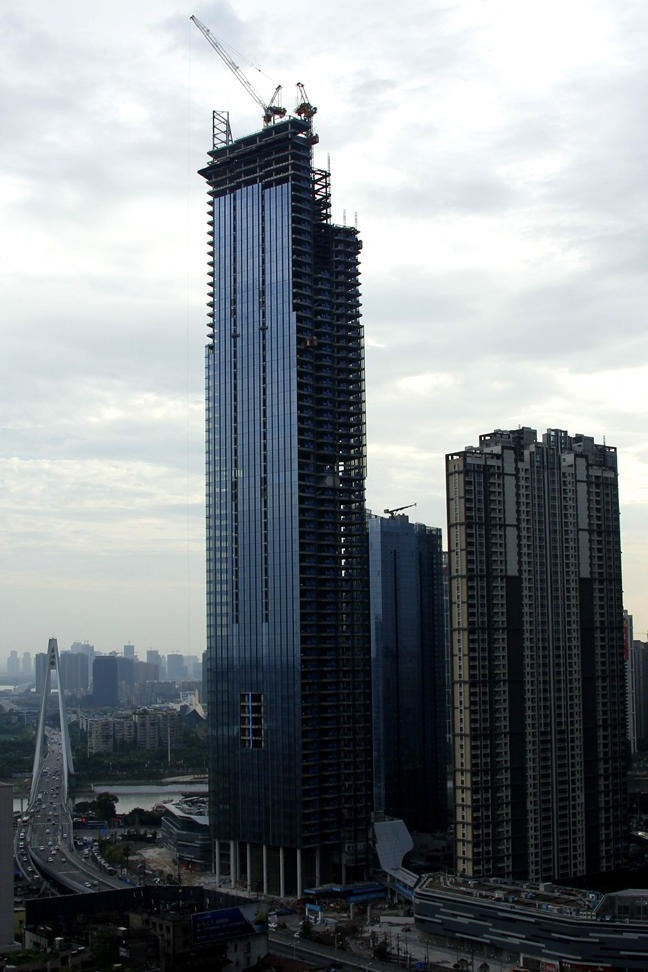
- Interactive map of the Yuexiu Fortune Center Tower 1 area
- Alternative names: Wuhan Starry Winking, Wuhan Qiakou Project Tower 1

General information
- Status: Completed
- Type: Office
- Location: Wuhan, Hubei, Yanhe Avenue, China
- Construction started: 2012
- Completed: 2017
- Owner: Yuexiu Property

Height
- Architectural: 330 m (1,080 ft)
- Tip: 330 m (1,080 ft)

Technical details
- Floor count: 68
- Floor area: 182,600 m^{2} (1,965,000 sq ft)

Design and construction
- Architecture firm: Wilkinson Eyre
- Services engineer: Meinhardt Group
- Main contractor: China State Construction Engineering Corporation

Yuexiu Fortune Center Tower 1 is an office supertall skyscraper in Wuhan, Hubei, China. It has a height of 330 metres (1,080 ft). Construction began in 2012 and the building was completed in 2017. The tower is the tallest building in a complex which includes an additional 8 residential towers and a shopping mall.

== See also ==
- List of tallest buildings in Wuhan
- List of tallest buildings in China
