= Minsheng Bank Building =

Supertall skyscraper in Wuhan, Hubei, China

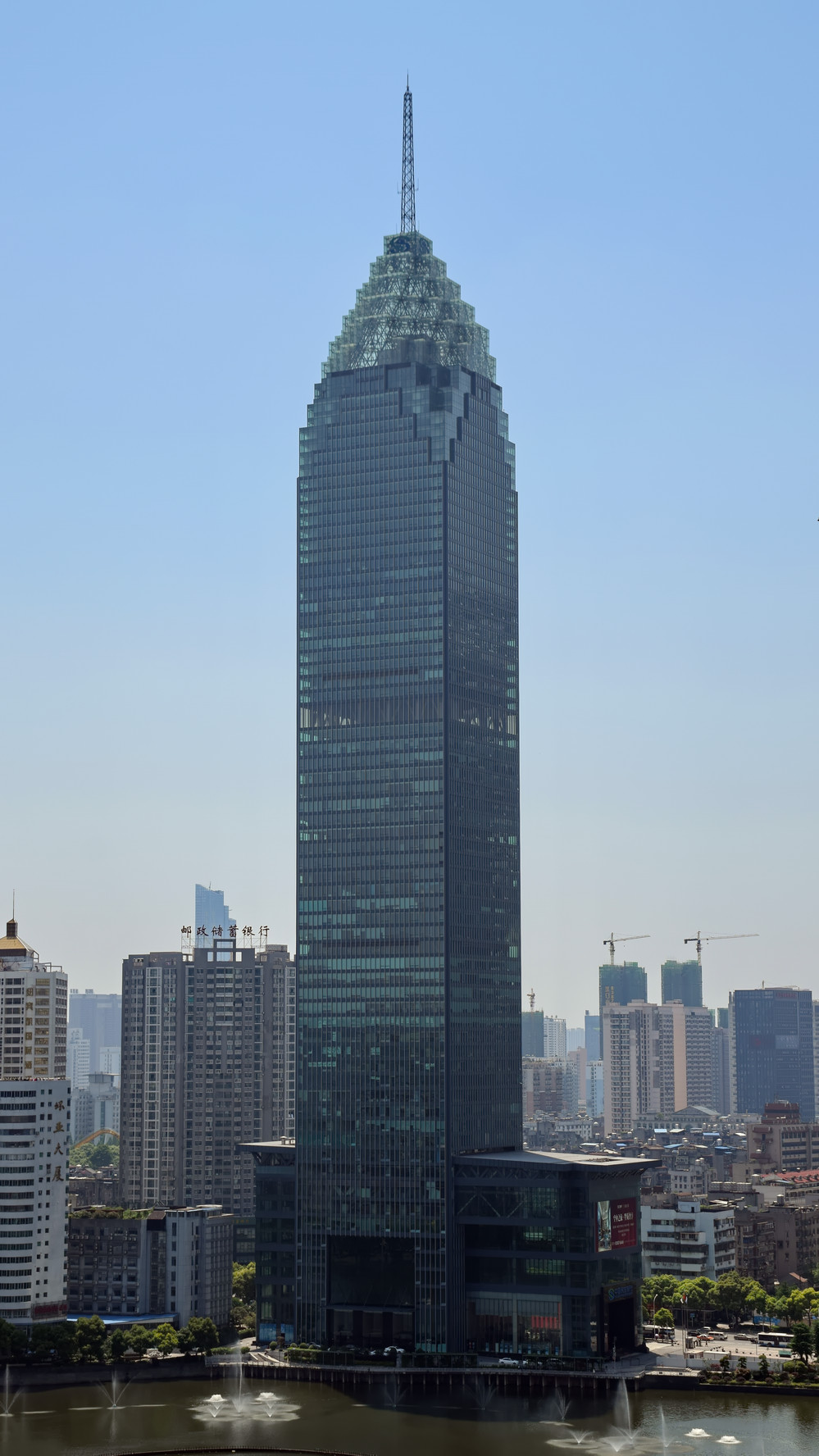
- Interactive map of the Minsheng Bank Building area

General information
- Type: office
- Location: Wuhan, Hubei, China
- Coordinates: 30.597°N 114.268°E
- Construction started: January 6, 2001
- Completed: June 19, 2008

Height
- Architectural: 331.0 m (1,086.0 ft)
- Roof: 290 m (950 ft)
- Top floor: 237.4 m (779 ft)

Technical details
- Floor count: 68
- Floor area: 110,000 m^{2} (1,200,000 sq ft)

Design and construction
- Architect: Wuhan Architectural Design Institute

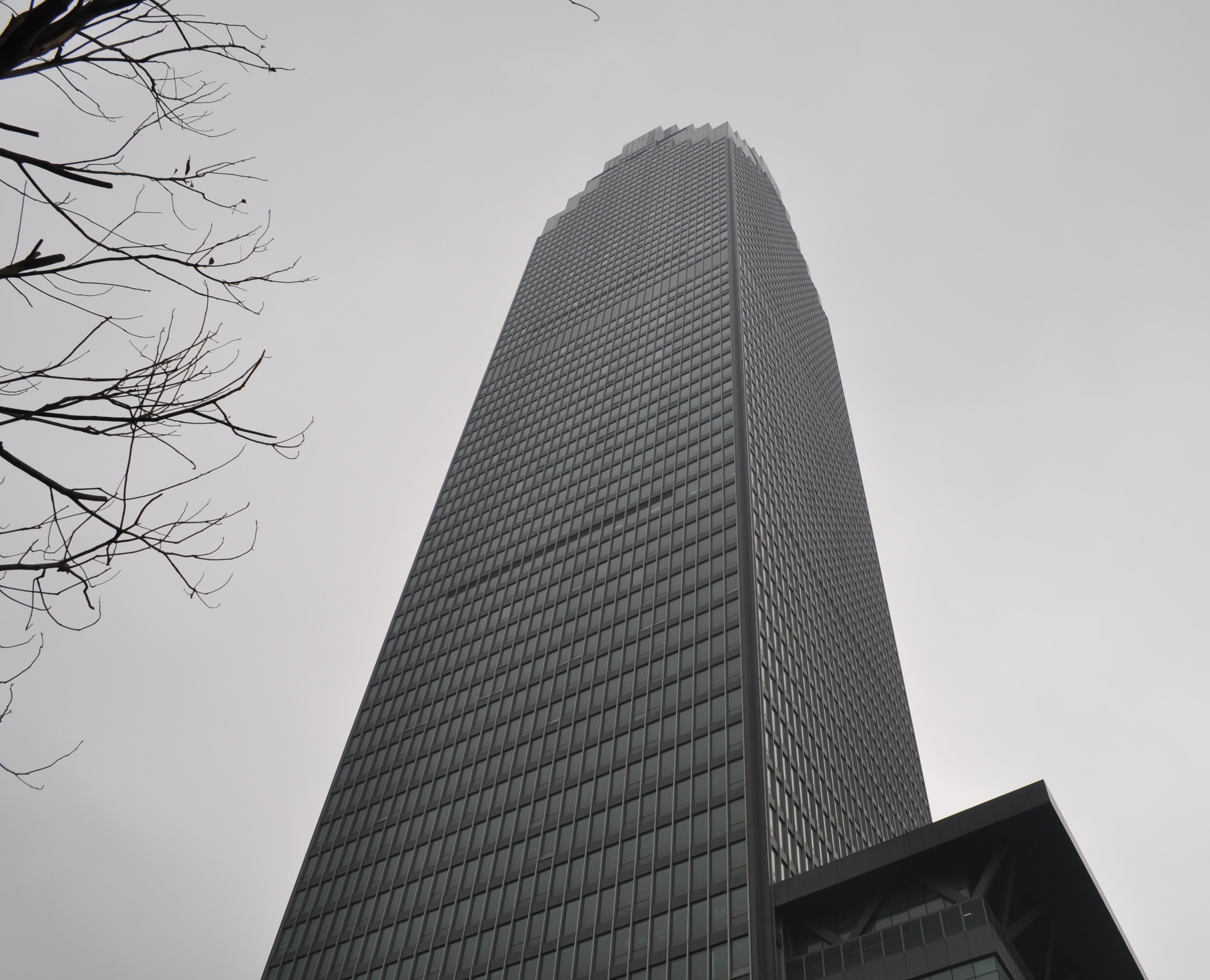
Photo of Minsheng Bank Building, Wuhan, China, 2010

The Minsheng Bank Building (also known as Wuhan International Securities Building) is a supertall skyscraper located in Wuhan, Hubei, China. It is the tallest building in mainland China entirely steel-structured lacking a reinforced concrete core.

== See also ==
- China Minsheng Bank
- List of tallest freestanding structures in the world
- List of tallest freestanding steel structures
- List of tallest buildings in Wuhan
