= Wuhan Center =

Supertall skyscraper in Wuhan, Hubei, China

Coordinates: 30°35′48″N 114°14′23″E

- 武汉中心
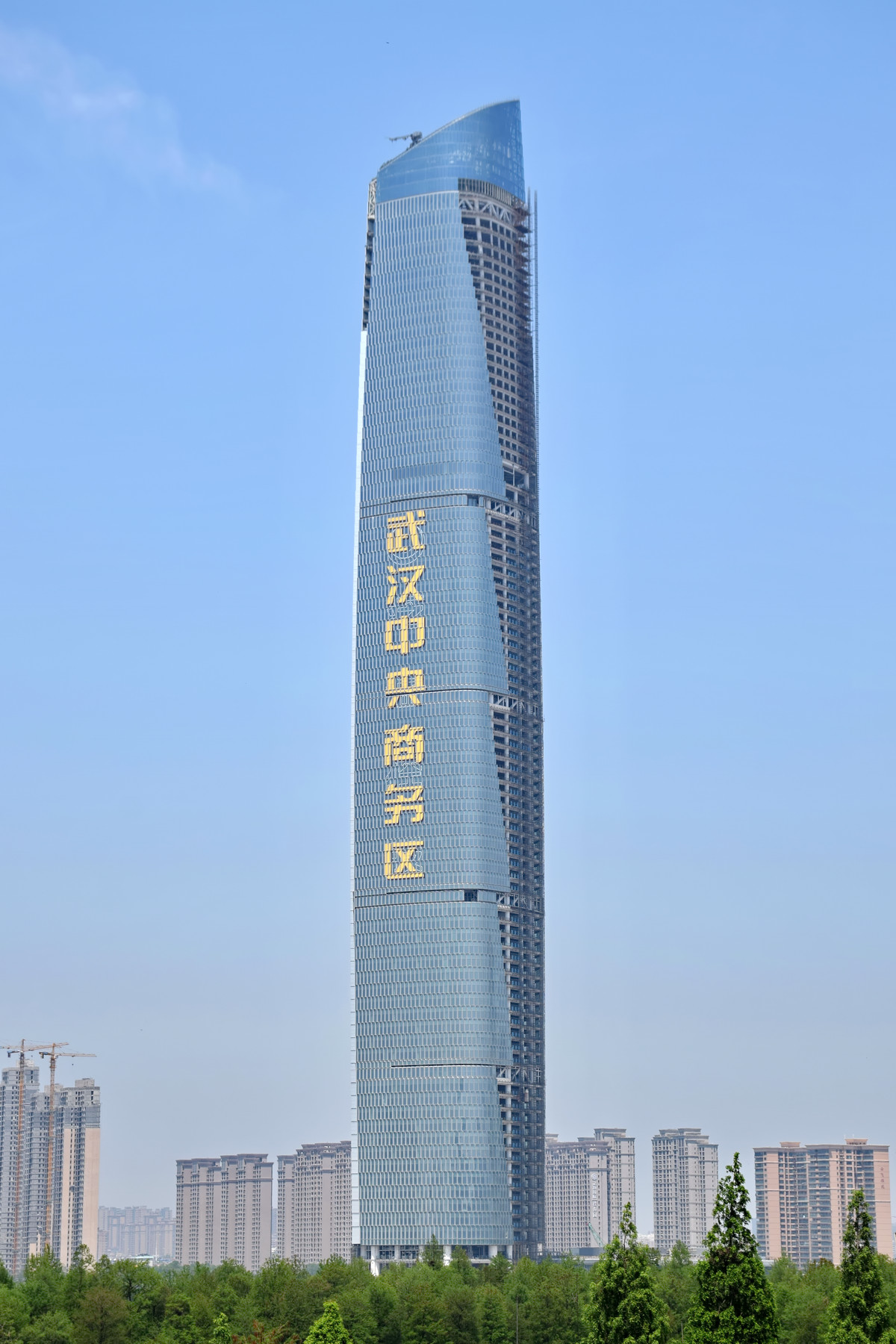
- Wuhan Center under construction in April 2017.
- Interactive map of the Wuhan Center area

General information
- Status: Completed
- Type: Hotel, Residential, Office
- Location: Wangjiadun CBD, Jianghan District, Wuhan, Hubei, China, Hanxi Road
- Groundbreaking: September 25, 2009
- Construction started: December 10, 2011
- Topped-out: April 16, 2015
- Opened: 2019
- Owner: Oceanwide Holdings

Height
- Architectural: 443.1 m (1,454 ft)

Technical details
- Floor count: 88
- Floor area: 343,900 m^{2} (3,702,000 sq ft)

Design and construction
- Architecture firm: East China Architectural Design & Research Institute (ECADI)
- Developer: Oceanwide Holdings
- Structural engineer: ECADI
- Services engineer: ECADI
- Main contractor: China State Construction Engineering

Other information
- Parking: 1,200

Wuhan Center (simplified Chinese: 武汉中心; traditional Chinese: 武漢中心; pinyin: Wǔhàn Zhōngxīn) is a skyscraper in Wuhan near Wuhan Business District Station in Jianghan District, Wuhan, Hubei, China. The skyscraper's construction started in 2011, and was completed and subsequently opened in 2019. The tower was topped out on April 16, 2015. It is the second tallest building in Central China, and the first building in Wuhan to exceed 300 m (980 ft).

== See also ==
- List of tallest buildings in China
- List of tallest buildings in Wuhan
