= List of tallest buildings =

The 828-metre-tall (2,717 ft) Burj Khalifa in Dubai has been the tallest building since 2009. The Burj Khalifa has been classified as megatall.

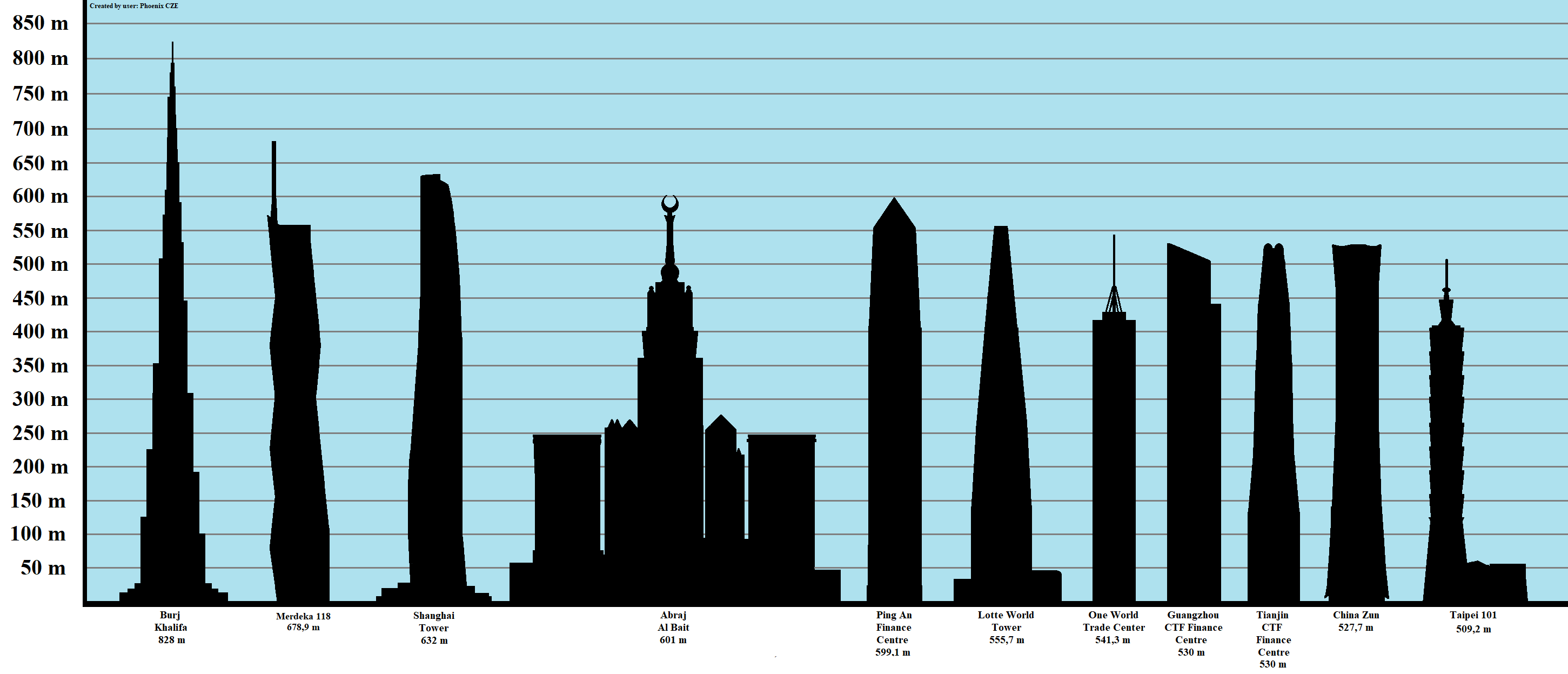
A diagram showing the tallest buildings as of 2024 (Outdated)

This is a list of the tallest buildings. Tall buildings, such as skyscrapers, are intended here as enclosed structures with continuously occupiable floors and a height of at least 350 metres (1,148 ft). Such definition excludes non-building structures, such as radio towers.

== History ==
Historically, the world's tallest man-made structure was the Great Pyramid of Giza in Egypt, which held the position for more than 3,800 years until the construction of Lincoln Cathedral in 1311. The Strasbourg Cathedral in France, completed in 1439, was the world's tallest building until 1874.

The first building considered to be a skyscraper was the 138 ft (42.1 m) Home Insurance Building, built in Chicago in 1885. The United States would remain the location of the world's tallest building throughout the 20th century until 1998, when the Petronas Towers were completed. Since then, two other buildings have gained the title: Taipei 101 in 2004 and Burj Khalifa in 2009. Since the beginning of the 21st century, the Middle East, China, and Southeast Asia have experienced booms in skyscraper construction.

== Ranking criteria and alternatives ==
The international non-profit organization Council on Vertical Urbanism (CVU) was formed in 1969 and announces the title of "The World's Tallest Building" and sets the standards by which buildings are measured. It maintains a list of the 100 tallest completed buildings in the world. The organization currently ranks Burj Khalifa in Dubai as the tallest at 828 m (2,717 ft). However, the CVU only recognizes buildings that are complete, and some buildings included within the lists in this article are not considered finished by the CVU.

In 1996, as a response to the dispute as to whether the Petronas Towers or the Sears Tower was taller, the council listed and ranked buildings in four categories:

- height to structural or architectural top;
- height to highest occupied floor;
- height to top of roof (removed as category in November 2009); and
- height to top of any part of the building.

All categories measure the building from the level of the lowest significant open-air pedestrian entrance.

Spires are considered integral parts of the architectural design of buildings, changes to which would substantially change the appearance and design of the building, whereas antennas may be added or removed without such consequences. The Petronas Towers, with their spires, are thus ranked higher than the Willis Tower (formerly the Sears Tower) with its antennas, despite the Petronas Towers' lower roofs and lower highest point.

Until 1996, the world's tallest building was defined by the height to the top of the tallest architectural element, including spires but not antennae. In 1930, this definitional argument led to a rivalry between the Bank of Manhattan Building and the Chrysler Building. The Bank of Manhattan Building (i.e. 40 Wall Street) employed only a short spire, was 282.5 m (927 ft) tall, and had a much higher top occupied floor (the second category in the 1996 criteria for tallest building). In contrast, the Chrysler Building employed a very large 38 m (125 ft) spire secretly assembled inside the building to claim the title of world's tallest building with a total height of 319 m (1046 ft), although it had a lower top occupied floor and a shorter height when both buildings' spires were excluded.

Upset by Chrysler's victory, Shreve & Lamb, the consulting architects of the Bank of Manhattan Building, wrote a newspaper article claiming that their building was actually the tallest, since it contained the world's highest usable floor, at 255 m (837 ft). They pointed out that the observation deck in the Bank of Manhattan Building was nearly 30 m (98 ft) above the top floor in the Chrysler Building, whose surpassing spire was strictly ornamental and inaccessible.

The Burj Khalifa currently tops the list regardless of which criterion is applied, though at a much lower margin when measured to highest occupied floor.

== Tallest buildings in the world ==
As of 2026, this list includes all 98 buildings (completed and architecturally topped out) that reach a height of 350 m (1,150 ft) or more, as assessed by their highest architectural feature. The building is considered as architecturally topped out when it is under construction, structurally topped out, fully clad, and the highest finished architectural elements are in place.

Of these buildings, almost half are in China. Six of the last seven buildings to have held the record as "tallest building" are still found in the list, with the exception being the North Tower of the original New York World Trade Center at 417 m (1,368 ft) after its destruction in the September 11 attacks of 2001. Had the World Trade Center Twin Towers never been destroyed and One World Trade Center never built, they would have ranked 39 and 40 on the list today.

Clear	Denotes building that is or was once the tallest in the world

	Name	Height		Floors	Image	City	Country	Year	Comments	Ref
	Name	m	ft	Floors	Image	City	Country	Year	Comments	Ref
1	Burj Khalifa	828	2,717	163 (+ 2 below ground)		Dubai	United Arab Emirates	2010	Tallest building in the world since 2009	
2	Merdeka Maybank Tower	678.9	2,227	118 (+ 5 below ground)		Kuala Lumpur	Malaysia	2024	Tallest building in Southeast Asia	
3	Shanghai Tower	632	2,073	128 (+ 5 below ground)		Shanghai	China	2015	Tallest building in East Asia, tallest twisted building in the world; second tallest by floor count; contains the highest luxury hotel in the world. Tallest building in China.	
4	Mecca Royal Clock Tower	601	1,972	120 (+ 3 below ground)		Mecca	Saudi Arabia	2012	Tallest building in Saudi Arabia, tallest clock tower and contains the highest museum in the world	
5	Ping An Finance Centre	599.1	1,966	115 (+ 5 below ground)		Shenzhen	China	2017	Tallest all-office building in the world; tallest in Guangdong Province	
6	Lotte World Tower	554.5	1,819	123 (+ 6 below ground)		Seoul	South Korea	2017	Tallest building in South Korea and the OECD	
7	One World Trade Center	541.3	1,776	104 (+ 5 below ground)		New York City	United States	2014	Tallest building outside of Asia; tallest building on an island. Tallest building in the Western Hemisphere, the United States and New York City.	
8	Guangzhou CTF Finance Centre	530	1,740	111 (+ 5 below ground)		Guangzhou	China	2016		
8	Tianjin CTF Finance Centre	530	1,740	97 (+ 4 below ground)		Tianjin	China	2019	Tallest completed building in Tianjin; tallest building in the world fewer than 100 floors	
10	CITIC Tower	527.7	1,731	109 (+ 8 below ground)		Beijing	China	2018	Tallest building in Beijing	
11	Taipei 101	508	1,667	101 (+ 5 below ground)		Taipei	Taiwan	2004	Tallest building in the world from 2004 to 2009; tallest building in Taiwan	
12	Shanghai World Financial Center	492	1,614	101 (+ 3 below ground)		Shanghai	China	2008	Tallest building in the world with a hole	
13	International Commerce Centre	484	1,588	108 (+ 4 below ground)		Hong Kong	China	2010	Tallest building in Hong Kong	
14	Wuhan Greenland Center	475.6	1,560	101 (+ 6 below ground)		Wuhan	China	2023	Tallest building in Hubei Province	
15	Central Park Tower	472.4	1,550	98 (+ 4 below ground)		New York City	United States	2021	Tallest residential building	
16	Lakhta Center	462	1,516	87 (+ 3 below ground)		Saint Petersburg	Russia	2019	Tallest building in Europe and Russia; Northernmost skyscraper in the world	
17	Landmark 81	461.2	1,513	81 (+ 3 below ground)		Ho Chi Minh City	Vietnam	2018	Tallest building in Vietnam	
18	International Land-Sea Center	458	1,503	98 (+ 4 below ground)		Chongqing	China	2024	Tallest building in Chongqing	
19	The Exchange 106	453.6	1,488	95 (+ 6 below ground)		Kuala Lumpur	Malaysia	2019		
20	Changsha IFS T1	452.1	1,483	94 (+ 5 below ground)		Changsha	China	2018	Tallest building in Hunan Province	
21	Petronas Tower 1	451.9	1,483	88 (+ 5 below ground)		Kuala Lumpur	Malaysia	1998	Tallest buildings in the world from 1998 to 2004; tallest buildings built in the 20th century; Tallest twin buildings	
21	Petronas Tower 2	451.9	1,483	88 (+ 5 below ground)		Kuala Lumpur	Malaysia	1998	Tallest buildings in the world from 1998 to 2004; tallest buildings built in the 20th century; Tallest twin buildings	
23	Zifeng Tower	450	1,480	89 (+ 5 below ground)		Nanjing	China	2010	Tallest building in Jiangsu Province, tied with Suzhou IFS	
23	Suzhou International Financial Center	450	1,480	95 (+ 5 below ground)		Suzhou	China	2019	Tallest building in Jiangsu Province, tied with Zifeng Tower	
25	Wuhan Center	443.1	1,454	88 (+ 4 below ground)		Wuhan	China	2019		
26	Willis Tower	442.1	1,450	108 (+ 3 below ground)		Chicago	United States	1974	Tallest building in the world from 1974 to 1998 as Sears Tower; tallest building in Illinois	
27	KK100	441.8	1,449	98 (+ 4 below ground)		Shenzhen	China	2011		
28	Guangzhou International Finance Center	438.6	1,439	101 (+ 4 below ground)		Guangzhou	China	2010		
29	111 West 57th Street	435.3	1,428	84 (+ 2 below ground)		New York City	United States	2021	Thinnest skyscraper in the world with a width-to-height ratio of about 1:24	
30	Shandong International Financial Center	428	1,404	88 (+ 4 below ground)		Jinan	China	2025	Tallest building in Shandong Province	
31	One Vanderbilt	427	1,401	62 (+ 4 below ground)		New York City	United States	2020		
32	432 Park Avenue	425.7	1,397	85 (+ 3 below ground)		New York City	United States	2015		
33	Marina 101	425	1,394	101 (+ 6 below ground)		Dubai	United Arab Emirates	2017		
34	Trump International Hotel and Tower	423.2	1,388	98 (+ 2 below ground)		Chicago	United States	2009		
35	270 Park Avenue	423	1,388	60		New York City	United States	2025		
36	Minying International Trade Center T2	422.6	1,386	85 (+ 3 below ground)		Dongguan	China	2021		
37	Jin Mao Tower	420.5	1,380	88 (+ 3 below ground)		Shanghai	China	1999		
38	Nanjing Financial City Phase II Plot C Tower 1	416.6	1,367	88		Nanjing	China	2025		
39	Princess Tower	413.4	1,356	101 (+ 6 below ground)		Dubai	United Arab Emirates	2012		
40	Al Hamra Tower	412.6	1,354	80 (+ 3 below ground)		Kuwait City	Kuwait	2011	Tallest building in Kuwait	
41	International Finance Centre	412	1,352	88 (+ 6 below ground)		Hong Kong	China	2003		
42	Haeundae LCT The Sharp Landmark Tower	411.6	1,350	101 (+ 5 below ground)		Busan	South Korea	2019	Tallest building in Busan	
43	Ningbo Central Plaza	409	1,342	80		Ningbo	China	2024	Tallest building in Zhejiang Province	
44	Guangxi China Resources Tower	402.7	1,321	86 (+ 3 below ground)		Nanning	China	2020	Tallest building in Guangxi Province	
45	Guiyang International Financial Center T1	401	1,316	79 (+ 5 below ground)		Guiyang	China	2020	Tallest building in Guizhou Province	
46	Iconic Tower	393.8	1,292	77 (+ 2 below ground)		New Administrative Capital	Egypt	2023	Tallest building in Africa and Egypt	
47	China Merchants Bank Global Headquarters Main Tower	393	1,289	77		Shenzhen	China	2025		
48	China Resources Tower	392.5	1,288	68 (+ 5 below ground)		Shenzhen	China	2018		
49	23 Marina	392.4	1,287	88 (+ 4 below ground)		Dubai	United Arab Emirates	2012		
50	CITIC Plaza	390.2	1,280	80 (+ 2 below ground)		Guangzhou	China	1996		
51	Citymark Centre	388.3	1,274	70 (+ 7 below ground)		Shenzhen	China	2022		
52	Shum Yip Upperhills Tower 1	388.1	1,273	80 (+ 3 below ground)		Shenzhen	China	2020		
53	30 Hudson Yards	387.1	1,270	73 (+ 1 below ground)		New York City	United States	2019		
54	Public Investment Fund Tower	385	1,263	72 (+ 4 below ground)		Riyadh	Saudi Arabia	2021	Tallest building in Riyadh	
55	Shun Hing Square	384	1,260	69 (+ 3 below ground)		Shenzhen	China	1996		
56	Eton Place Dalian Tower 1	383.2	1,257	80 (+ 4 below ground)		Dalian	China	2016	Tallest building in Liaoning Province	
57	Autograph Tower	382.9	1,256	75 (+ 6 below ground)		Jakarta	Indonesia	2022	Tallest building in Indonesia. Tallest building in the Southern Hemisphere.	
58	Logan Century Center 1	381.3	1,251	82 (+ 4 below ground)		Nanning	China	2018		
59	Burj Mohammed bin Rashid	381.2	1,251	88 (+ 5 below ground)		Abu Dhabi	United Arab Emirates	2014		
60	Empire State Building	381	1,250	102 (+ 1 below ground)		New York City	United States	1931	Tallest building in the world from 1931 to 1972	
61	Elite Residence	380.5	1,248	87 (+ 4 below ground)		Dubai	United Arab Emirates	2012		
62	Ciel Dubai Marina	377	1,237	81		Dubai	United Arab Emirates	2025	Tallest hotel in the world	
63	Riverview Plaza	376	1,234	73 (+ 3 below ground)		Wuhan	China	2021		
64	Guangdong Business Center	375.5	1,232	60 (+ 5 below ground)		Guangzhou	China	2025		
65	Dabaihui Plaza	375.6	1,232	70 (+ 4 below ground)		Shenzhen	China	2021		
66	Central Plaza	373.9	1,227	78 (+ 3 below ground)		Hong Kong	China	1992	Contains the highest church in the world	
67	Federation Tower (East Tower)	373.7	1,226	93 (+ 4 below ground)		Moscow	Russia	2016	Tallest building in Moscow	
68	Hengfeng Guiyang Center Tower 1	373.5	1,225	77 (+ 5 below ground)		Guiyang	China	2025		
69	Dalian International Trade Center	370.2	1,215	86 (+ 7 below ground)		Dalian	China	2019		
69	Shanghai International Trade Center Tower 1	370	1,210	70		Shanghai	China	2025		
69	Kempinski The Boulevard Dubai	370	1,210	73 (+ 3 below ground)		Dubai	United Arab Emirates	2017		
72	Haitian Center Tower 2	368.9	1,210	73 (+ 6 below ground)		Qingdao	China	2021		
73	Golden Eagle Tiandi Tower A	368.1	1,208	77 (+ 4 below ground)		Nanjing	China	2019		
74	Bank of China Tower	367.4	1,205	72 (+ 4 below ground)		Hong Kong	China	1990		
75	Bank of America Tower	365.8	1,200	55 (+ 3 below ground)		New York City	United States	2009		
76	St. Regis Chicago	362.9	1,191	101 (+ 5 below ground)		Chicago	United States	2020	Tallest structure in the world designed by a woman	
77	Almas Tower	360	1,180	68 (+ 5 below ground)		Dubai	United Arab Emirates	2008		
77	Ping An Finance Center Tower 1	360	1,180	62 (+ 3 below ground)		Jinan	China	2023		
79	Huiyun Center	359.2	1,178	80		Shenzhen	China	2023		
80	Hanking Center	358.9	1,177	65 (+ 5 below ground)		Shenzhen	China	2018		
81	Greenland Group Suzhou Center	358	1,175	77 (+ 3 below ground)		Suzhou	China	2025		
81	City Tower 1	358	1,175	94		Dubai	United Arab Emirates	2025		
83	Gevora Hotel	356.3	1,169	75 (+ 2 below ground)		Dubai	United Arab Emirates	2017		
84	Galaxy World Tower 1	356	1,168	71 (+ 5 below ground)		Shenzhen	China	2023		
84	Galaxy World Tower 2	356	1,168	71 (+ 5 below ground)		Shenzhen	China	2023		
84	Il Primo Tower	356	1,168	79		Dubai	United Arab Emirates	2022		
87	JW Marriott Marquis Dubai Tower 1	355.4	1,166	82 (+ 2 below ground)		Dubai	United Arab Emirates	2012		
87	JW Marriott Marquis Dubai Tower 2	355.4	1,166	82 (+ 2 below ground)		Dubai	United Arab Emirates	2013		
89	Emirates Office Tower	354.6	1,163	54		Dubai	United Arab Emirates	2000		
90	Raffles City Chongqing T3N	354.5	1,163	79 (+ 3 below ground)		Chongqing	China	2019		
90	Raffles City Chongqing T4N	354.5	1,163	74 (+ 3 below ground)		Chongqing	China	2019		
92	OKO – South Tower	354.2	1,162	90 (+ 2 below ground)		Moscow	Russia	2015		
93	CBRT Tower	352	1,155	59		Istanbul	Turkey	2024	Tallest building in Turkey	
93	The Marina Torch	352	1,155	86 (+ 4 below ground)		Dubai	United Arab Emirates	2011		
95	SkyTower at Pinnacle One Yonge	351.4	1,153	106		Toronto	Canada	2026	Tallest building in Canada. Tallest building in North America and the Western Hemisphere outside of the United States.	
96	Forum 66 Tower 1	350.6	1,150	68 (+ 4 below ground)		Shenyang	China	2015		
97	The Pinnacle	350.3	1,149	60 (+ 6 below ground)		Guangzhou	China	2012		
98	Xi'an Glory International Financial Center	350	1,148	75 (+ 4 below ground)		Xi'an	China	2021	Tallest building in Shaanxi Province	

== Alternative measurements ==
=== Height to pinnacle (highest point) ===
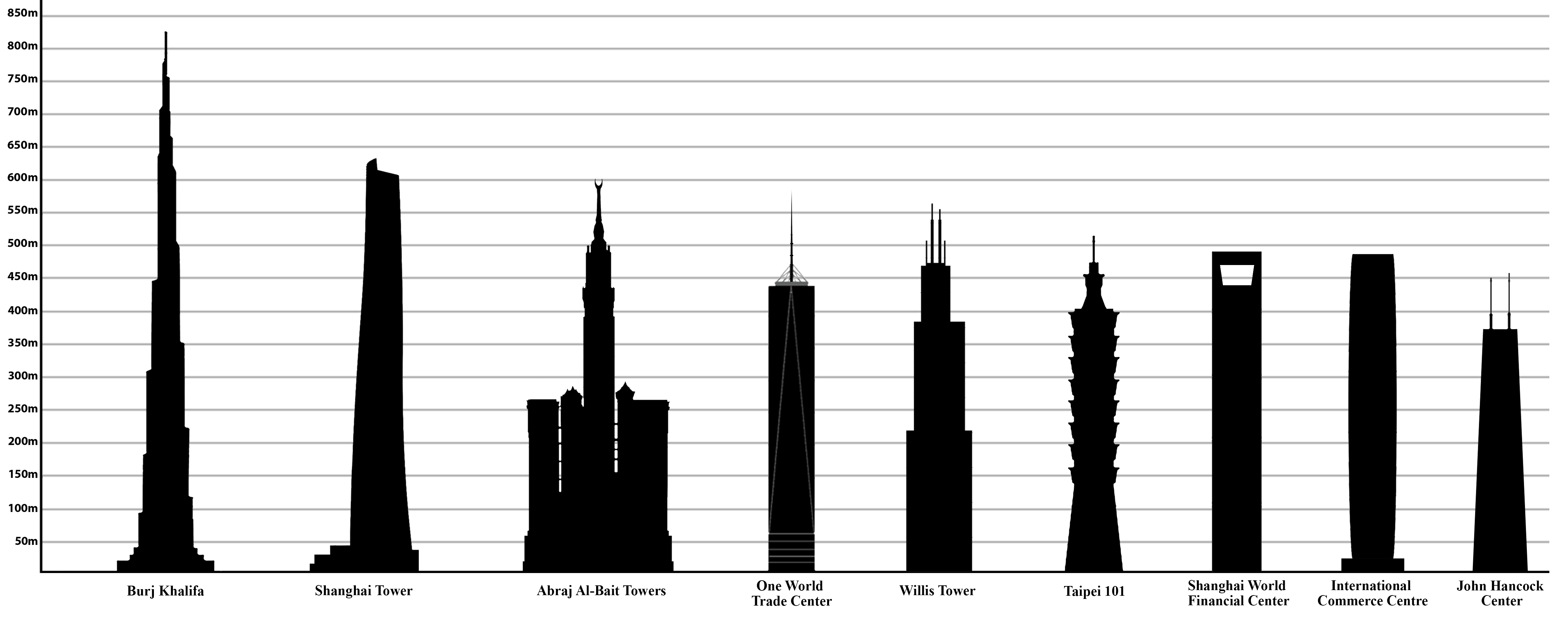
Tallest buildings by pinnacle height, including all masts, poles, antennae, etc. in 2014

This measurement disregards distinctions between architectural and non-architectural extensions, and simply measures to the highest point, irrespective of material or function of the highest element.

This measurement is useful for air traffic obstacle determinations, and is also a wholly objective measure. However, this measurement includes extensions that are easily added, removed, and modified from a building and are independent of the overall structure.

This measurement only recently came into use, when the Petronas Towers passed the Sears Tower (now named Willis Tower) in height. The former was considered taller because its spires were considered architectural, while the latter's antennae were not. This led to the split of definitions, with the Sears Tower claiming the lead in this and the height-to-roof (now highest occupied floor) categories, and with the Petronas claiming the lead in the architectural height category.

If the original World Trade Center towers were still standing, the North (1,728 feet (526.7 m), including the antenna) and South Towers (1,377 feet (419.7 m)) would fall between numbers 11 and 37 on the current list (as it can be assumed the rebuilt One World Trade Center would have never been built).

†	Denotes building with pinnacle height higher than architectural

Rank	Building	City	Country	Height		Floors	Built
1	Burj Khalifa†	Dubai	United Arab Emirates	829.8 m	2,722 ft	163	2010
2	Merdeka Maybank Tower†	Kuala Lumpur	Malaysia	680.1 m	2,231 ft	118	2023
3	Shanghai Tower	Shanghai	China	632 m	2,073 ft	128	2015
4	Mecca Royal Clock Tower	Mecca	Saudi Arabia	601 m	1,971 ft	120	2012
5	Ping An Finance Centre	Shenzhen	China	599.1 m	1,965 ft	115	2016
6	Lotte World Tower†	Seoul	South Korea	555.7 m	1,823 ft	123	2016
7	One World Trade Center†	New York City	United States	546.2 m	1,792 ft	104	2014
8	Tianjin CTF Finance Centre†	Tianjin	China	530.4 m	1,740 ft	98	2019
9	Guangzhou CTF Finance Centre	Guangzhou	China	530 m	1,739 ft	111	2016
10	China Zun	Beijing	China	528 m	1,732 ft	108	2018
11	Willis Tower†	Chicago	United States	527 m	1,729 ft	108	1974
12	Taipei 101	Taipei	Taiwan	508 m	1,667 ft	101	2004
13	Shanghai World Financial Center†	Shanghai	China	494.3 m	1,622 ft	101	2008
14	International Commerce Centre	Hong Kong	China	484 m	1,588 ft	118	2010
15	Wuhan Greenland Center	Wuhan	China	475.6 m	1,560 ft	97	2021
16	Central Park Tower	New York City	United States	472.4 m	1,550 ft	98	2020
17	Landmark 81†	Ho Chi Minh City	Vietnam	469.5 m	1,540 ft	81	2018
18	Lakhta Center	St. Petersburg	Russia	462 m	1,516 ft	87	2019
19	International Land-Sea Center	Chongqing	China	458.2 m	1,503 ft	98	2022
20	875 North Michigan Avenue†	Chicago	United States	456.9 m	1,499 ft	100	1969
21	The Exchange 106	Kuala Lumpur	Malaysia	453.6 m	1,488 ft	95	2019
22	Changsha IFS Tower T1	Changsha	China	452.1 m	1,483 ft	94	2018
23	Petronas Tower 1	Kuala Lumpur	Malaysia	451.9 m	1,483 ft	88	1998
23	Petronas Tower 2	Kuala Lumpur	Malaysia	451.9 m	1,483 ft	88	1998
25	Zifeng Tower	Nanjing	China	450 m	1,476 ft	89	2010
25	Suzhou IFS	Suzhou	China	450 m	1,476 ft	98	2019
27	Empire State Building†	New York City	United States	443.2 m	1,454 ft	102	1931
28	Kingkey 100	Shenzhen	China	441.8 m	1,449 ft	100	2011
29	Guangzhou International Finance Center	Guangzhou	China	438.6 m	1,445 ft	103	2009
30	Wuhan Center	Wuhan	China	438 m	1,437 ft	88	2019
31	111 West 57th Street	New York City	United States	435.3 m	1,428 ft	82	2020
32	Minying International Trade Center T2	Dongguan	China	426.9 m	1,401 ft	88	2020
33	One Vanderbilt	New York City	United States	427 m	1,401 ft	58	2020
34	432 Park Avenue	New York City	United States	425.5 m	1,396 ft	85	2015
35	Marina 101	Dubai	United Arab Emirates	425 m	1,394 ft	101	2017
36	Trump International Hotel and Tower	Chicago	United States	423.2 m	1,388 ft	96	2009
37	Jin Mao Tower	Shanghai	China	421 m	1,381 ft	88	1998
38	Princess Tower†	Dubai	United Arab Emirates	414 m	1,358 ft	101	2012
39	Al Hamra Tower	Kuwait City	Kuwait	412.6 m	1,354 ft	80	2010
40	Two International Finance Centre	Hong Kong	China	412 m	1,352 ft	88	2003
41	Haeundae LCT The Sharp Landmark Tower	Busan	South Korea	411.6 m	1,350 ft	101	2019
42	Guangxi China Resources Tower	Nanning	China	402.7 m	1,321 ft	85	2019
43	Guiyang Financial Center Tower 1	Guiyang	China	401 m	1,316 ft	79	2021

=== Height to occupied floor ===
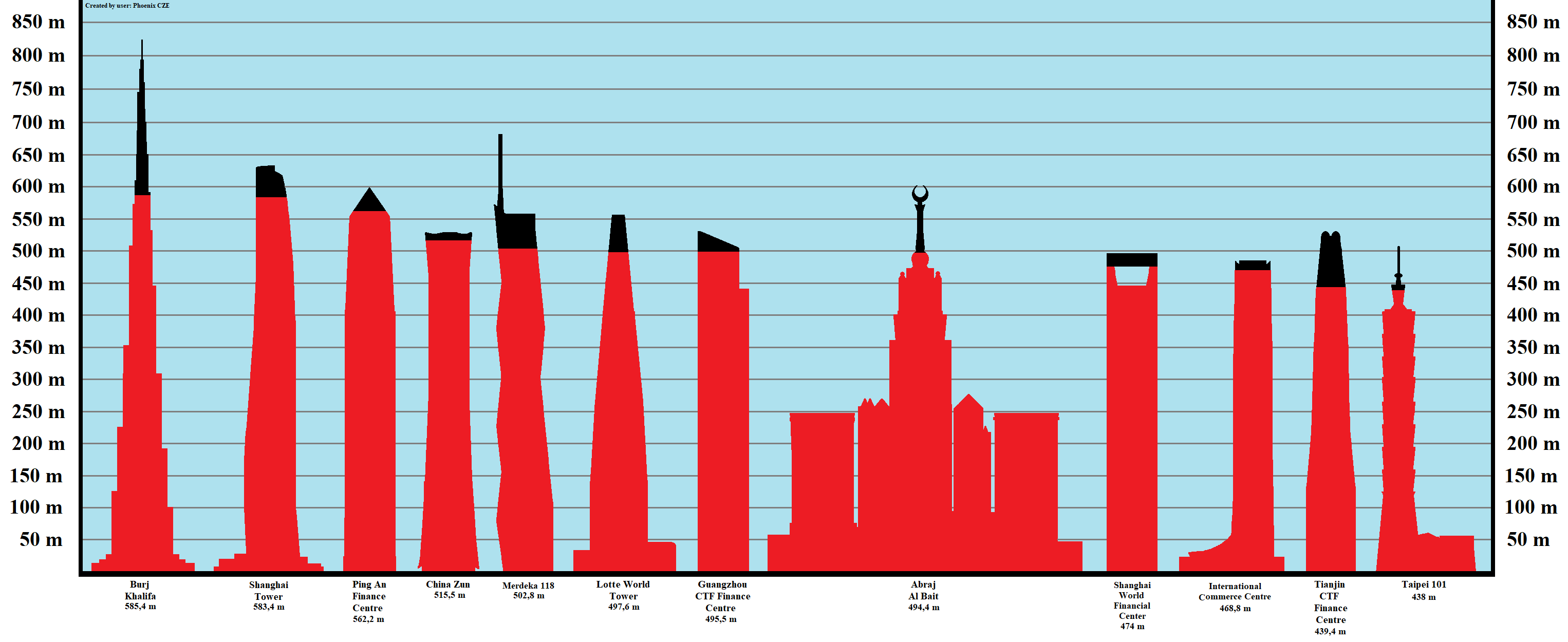
Tallest buildings by highest occupied floor in 2022.

This height is measured to the highest occupiable floor within the building.

Building	City	Country	Height	Floors	Built
Burj Khalifa	Dubai	United Arab Emirates	585.4 m (1,921 ft)	163	2010
Shanghai Tower	Shanghai	China	583.4 m (1,914 ft)	128	2015
Ping An Finance Center	Shenzhen	China	562.2 m (1,844 ft)	115	2016
China Zun	Beijing	China	515.5 m (1,691 ft)	108	2018
Merdeka Maybank Tower	Kuala Lumpur	Malaysia	502.8 m (1,650 ft)	118	2023
Lotte World Tower	Seoul	South Korea	497.6 m (1,633 ft)	123	2016
Guangzhou CTF Finance Centre	Guangzhou	China	495.5 m (1,626 ft)	111	2016
Mecca Royal Clock Tower	Mecca	Saudi Arabia	494.4 m (1,622 ft)	120	2012
Shanghai World Financial Center	Shanghai	China	474 m (1,555 ft)	101	2008
International Commerce Centre	Hong Kong	China	468.8 m (1,538 ft)	118	2010
Wuhan Greenland Center	Wuhan	China	467 m (1,532 ft)	101	2023
Tianjin CTF Finance Centre	Tianjin	China	439.4 m (1,442 ft)	97	2018
Taipei 101	Taipei	Taiwan	438 m (1,437 ft)	101	2004
Central Park Tower	New York City	United States	431.8 m (1,417 ft)	98	2020
Changsha IFS Tower T1	Changsha	China	431 m (1,414 ft)	94	2017
International Land-Sea Center	Chongqing	China	429.8 m (1,410 ft)	98	2022
KK100	Shenzhen	China	427.1 m (1,401 ft)	98	2011
Guangzhou International Finance Center	Guangzhou	China	415.1 m (1,362 ft)	101	2010
Willis Tower	Chicago	United States	412.7 m (1,354 ft)	108	1974
Zijin Financial Building	Nanjing	China	412.2 m (1,352 ft)	88	2025

=== Height to roof ===
This list of tallest buildings by height to roof ranks completed skyscrapers by height to roof which reach a height of 300 metres (984 ft) or more. Only buildings with continuously occupiable floors are included, thus non-building structures, including towers, are not included. Some assessments of the tallest building use 'height to roof' to determine tallest building, as 'architectural feature' is regarded as a subjective and an imprecise comparative measure. However, in November 2009, the CTBUH stopped using the roof height as the metric for tall buildings because modern tall buildings rarely have a part of the building that can categorically be deemed the roof.

Rank	Building	City	Country	Height (m)	Height (ft)	Floors	Built	Reference
1	Burj Khalifa	Dubai	UAE	739.4 m	2,426 ft	163	2010	
2	Shanghai Tower	Shanghai	China	574.5 m	1,885 ft	127	2015	
3	Ping An Finance Center	Shenzhen	China	555 m	1,821 ft	115	2016	
4	China Zun	Beijing	China	524 m	1719 ft	109	2018	
5	Merdeka Maybank Tower	Kuala Lumpur	Malaysia	518.2 m	1,700 ft	118	2023	
6	Guangzhou CTF Finance Centre	Guangzhou	China	518 m	1,699 ft	111	2016	
7	Mecca Royal Clock Tower	Mecca	Saudi Arabia	508 m	1,666 ft	120	2012	
8	Lotte World Tower	Seoul	South Korea	497.6 m	1,633 ft	123	2016	
9	Shanghai World Financial Center	Shanghai	China	487.41 m	1,599 ft	101	2008	
10	International Commerce Centre	Hong Kong	China	479.83 m	1,574 ft	118	2010	
11	Central Park Tower	New York City	United States	472.44 m	1,550 ft	131	2019	
12	Tianjin CTF Finance Centre	Tianjin	China	471.1 m	1,545 ft	97	2019	
13	Taipei 101	Taipei	Taiwan	449.20 m	1,471 ft	101	2004	
14	Willis Tower	Chicago	United States	442.14 m	1,451 ft	108	1974	
15	KK100	Shenzhen	China	442 m	1,449 ft	100	2011	-->
16	Guangzhou International Finance Center	Guangzhou	China	432 m	1,417 ft	103	2009	
17	432 Park Avenue	New York City	United States	425.5 m	1,396 ft	96	2015	-->
18	One World Trade Center	New York City	United States	417 m	1,368 ft	104	2014	
19	Haeundae LCT Landmark Tower	Busan	South Korea	411.6 m	1,350 ft	101	2019	
20	International Finance Centre	Hong Kong	China	401.1 m	1,316 ft	88	2003	
21	Princess Tower	Dubai	UAE	392 m	1,286 ft	101	2012	
22	Jin Mao Tower	Shanghai	China	382.5 m	1,255 ft	88	1998	
23	Zifeng Tower	Nanjing	China	381.3 m	1,251 ft	89	2009	
24	Empire State Building	New York City	United States	381 m	1,250 ft	102	1931	
25	Petronas Tower 1	Kuala Lumpur	Malaysia	378.5 m	1,250 ft	88	1998	
25	Petronas Tower 2	Kuala Lumpur	Malaysia	378.5 m	1,250 ft	88	1998	
27	Marina 101	Dubai	UAE	371 m	1,207 ft	80	2014	
27	Al Hamra Tower	Kuwait City	Kuwait	368 m	1,207 ft	80	2011	
29	Trump International Hotel and Tower	Chicago	United States	357.8 m	1,174 ft	96	2009	
30	Tuntex Sky Tower	Kaohsiung	Taiwan	347.5 m	1,140 ft	85	1997	
31	Aon Center	Chicago	United States	346.25 m	1,136 ft	83	1973	
32	John Hancock Center	Chicago	United States	343.5 m	1,127 ft	100	1969	
33	Haeundae LCT the Sharp I	Busan	South Korea	339.1 m	1,112 ft	85	2019	
34	Mercury City Tower	Moscow	Russia	339 m	1,112 ft	75	2012	
35	Haeundae LCT the Sharp II	Busan	South Korea	333.1 m	1,093 ft	85	2019	
35	China World Trade Center Tower 3	Beijing	China	333 m	1,093 ft	74	2008	
35	Parc1 Tower 1	Seoul	South Korea	333 m	1,093 ft	69	2020	
38	SkyTower at Pinnacle One Yonge	Toronto	Canada	331 m	1,086 ft	106	2026	
39	Ryugyong Hotel	Pyongyang	North Korea	330 m	1,083 ft	105	1992^{[C]}	
40	The Index	Dubai	UAE	328 m	1,076 ft	80	2009	
41	Azabudai Hills Mori JP Tower	Tokyo	Japan	325.4 m	1,067 ft	64	2023	
42	Shun Hing Square	Shenzhen	China	324.8 m	1,066 ft	69	1996	
43	Four Seasons Place KLCC	Kuala Lumpur	Malaysia	323 m	1,076 ft	74	2018	
44	CITIC Plaza	Guangzhou	China	321.9 m	1,056 ft	80	1997	
45	Nina Tower	Hong Kong	China	318.8 m	1,046 ft	80	2006	
46	Rose Tower	Dubai	UAE	315 m	1,033 ft	72	2008	
46	Bank of China Tower	Hong Kong	China	315 m	1,033 ft	72	1990	
48	Bank of America Plaza	Atlanta	United States	311.8 m	1,023 ft	55	1992	
49	Emirates Office Tower	Dubai	UAE	311 m	1,020 ft	56	2000	
50	U.S. Bank Tower	Los Angeles	United States	310.3 m	1,018 ft	73	1989	
51	Menara Telekom	Kuala Lumpur	Malaysia	309.9 m	1,017 ft	55	2001	
52	Almas Tower	Dubai	UAE	310 m	1,017 ft	74	2008	
52	The Shard	London	United Kingdom	310 m	1,017 ft	72	2012	
54	Central Plaza	Hong Kong	China	309 m	1,014 ft	78	1992	
55	One57	New York City	United States	306m	1,005 ft	73	2014	
56	The Address Downtown Burj Khalifa	Dubai	UAE	306 m	1,004 ft	78	2008	
57	JPMorgan Chase Tower	Houston	United States	305.4 m	1,002 ft	75	1982	
58	Northeast Asia Trade Tower	Incheon	South Korea	305.1 m	1,001 ft	68	2010	
59	Baiyoke Tower II	Bangkok	Thailand	304 m	997 ft	85	1997	
60	Wells Fargo Plaza	Houston	United States	302.4 m	992 ft	71	1983	
61	Kingdom Centre	Riyadh	Saudi Arabia	302 m	991 ft	41	2002	
62	Moscow Tower	Moscow	Russia	302 m	989 ft	76	2010	
63	Haeundae Doosan We've the Zenith 101	Busan	South Korea	300 m	984 ft	80	2011	
63	Abeno Harukas	Osaka	Japan	300 m	984 ft	60	2014	

== Buildings under construction ==
This is a list of buildings taller than 350 m that are currently under construction. On-hold buildings whose construction was interrupted after it had reached a significantly advanced state are listed in a separate table.

=== Under construction ===
Building	Country	City	Planned architectural height	Floors	Planned completion	Ref.
Jeddah Tower	Saudi Arabia	Jeddah	1,008 m (3,307 ft)	167+	2028	
Burj Azizi	UAE	Dubai	725 m (2,379 ft)	133	2030	
Goldin Finance 117	China	Tianjin	597 m (1,959 ft)	128	2027	
Burj Binghatti Jacob & Co Residences	UAE	Dubai	557 m (1,827 ft)	105	2027	
Senna Tower	Brazil	Balneário Camboriú	550 m (1,800 ft)	154	2030	
Tiger Sky Tower	UAE	Dubai	532 m (1,745 ft)	116	2029	
Six Senses Residences Dubai Marina	UAE	Dubai	517 m (1,696 ft)	125	2028	
The Line	Saudi Arabia	Neom	500 m (1,600 ft)	?	2030	
Greenland Jinmao International Finance Center	China	Nanjing	499.8 m (1,640 ft)	102	2028	
HeXi Yuzui Tower A	China	Nanjing	498.8 m (1,636 ft)	84	2028	
Panda Tower - Tianfu Center	China	Chengdu	488.9 m (1,604 ft)	95	2027	
Rizhao Center	China	Rizhao	485 m (1,591 ft)	94	2028	
Torre Rise	Mexico	Monterrey	484 m (1,588 ft)	88	2027	
North Bund Tower	China	Shanghai	480 m (1,570 ft)	97	2030	
Wuhan CTF Centre	China	Wuhan	475 m (1,558 ft)	84	2029	
Suzhou CSC Fortune Center	China	Suzhou	470 m (1,540 ft)	100	2028	
Chengdu Greenland Tower	China	Chengdu	468 m (1,535 ft)	101	2029	
Aeternitas Tower	UAE	Dubai	450 m (1,480 ft)	106	2027	
China Resources Land Center	China	Dongguan	436.1 m (1,431 ft)	98	2026	
Haikou Tower 1	China	Haikou	428 m (1,404 ft)	93	2027	
Tour F	Ivory Coast	Abidjan	421 m (1,381 ft)	75	2026	
Tsingshan Holdings Group Global Headquarters Tower 1	China	Wenzhou	418 m (1,371 ft)			
Shenzhen Cloud of Innovation Center	China	Shenzhen	407 m (1,335 ft)	83	2026	
Great River Center	China	Wuhan	400 m (1,300 ft)	82	2026	
Hangzhou West Railway Station Hub Tower 1	China	Hangzhou	399.8 m (1,312 ft)	83		
China Merchants Group West Headquarters	China	Chengdu	396 m (1,299 ft)	82	2028	
Shenzhen Bay Super Headquarters Base Tower B	China	Shenzhen	394.4 m (1,294 ft)	81	2029	
Shenzhen Bay Super Headquarters Base Tower C-1	China	Shenzhen	394 m (1,293 ft)	78	2027	
Lucheng Square	China	Wenzhou	388.8 m (1,276 ft)	79	2026	
Guohua Financial Center Tower 1	China	Wuhan	388 m (1,273 ft)	79		
Torch Tower	Japan	Tokyo	385 m (1,263 ft)	62	2028	
Shekou Prince Bay Tower	China	Shenzhen	380 m (1,250 ft)	70		
Shenzhen Luohu Friendship Trading Centre	China	Shenzhen	379.9 m (1,246 ft)	83	2026	
China Merchants Prince Bay Tower	China	Shenzhen	374 m (1,227 ft)	59	2028	
2 World Trade Center	United States	New York City	374 m (1,227 ft)	55	2031	
Hengli Global Operations Headquarters Tower 1	China	Suzhou	369 m (1,211 ft)			
Shenyang International Center Tower 1	China	Shenyang	366 m (1,201 ft)	75	2027	
Bayz 101 Tower	UAE	Dubai	363 m (1,191 ft)	108		
Bayz 102 Tower	UAE	Dubai	362 m (1,188 ft)	103		
Taipei Twin Tower 1	Taiwan	Taipei	360 m (1,181 ft)	70	2027	
Naga 3 Tower 1	Cambodia	Phnom Penh	358 m (1,175 ft)	70		
Bay Area Smart Plaza	China	Shenzhen	358 m (1,175 ft)	77	2027	
Binghatti Skyblade	UAE	Dubai	357 m (1,171 ft)	66	2027	
Guohong Center	China	Wenzhou	356 m (1,168 ft)	71	2028	
Shenzhen Bay Super Headquarters Base Tower C-2	China	Shenzhen	355.7 m (1,167 ft)	68	2027	
Poly Liangxi Plaza	China	Foshan	350 m (1,150 ft)		2026	

=== On hold ===
Building	Planned architectural height	Floors	Planned completion	Country	City	Ref.
BUMN Tower (Note: Construction is set to restart in August 2026)	780 m (2,560 ft)	156		Indonesia	Nusantara	
Tower M (Note: Retail podium near completion)	700 m (2,300 ft)	145		Malaysia	Kuala Lumpur	
Legends Tower (Note: Surrounding campus is already under construction)	581 m (1,906 ft)	134		United States	Oklahoma City	
Evergrande Hefei Center T1	518 m (1,699 ft)	112		China	Hefei	
Greenland Jinmao International Financial Center	499.8 m (1,640 ft)	102		China	Nanjing	
Suzhou Zhongnan Center	499.2 m (1,638 ft)	103		China	Suzhou	
China International Silk Road Center	498 m (1,634 ft)	101		China	Xi'an	
Chushang Building	475 m (1,558 ft)	111		China	Wuhan	
Fosun Bund Center T1	470 m (1,540 ft)			China	Wuhan	
Evergrande City Light	453.5 m (1,488 ft)	88		China	Ningbo	
Tianshan Gate of the World Plots 27 and 28	450 m (1,480 ft)	106		China	Shijiazhuang	
Dubai Towers Doha	436.5 m (1,432 ft)	91		Qatar	Doha	
One Bangkok	436.1 m (1,431 ft)	92		Thailand	Bangkok	
Burj Almasa	432 m (1,417 ft)	93		Saudi Arabia	Jeddah	
Greenland Center Tower 1	428 m (1,404 ft)			China	Kunming	
Najning Olympic Suning Tower	419.8 m (1,377 ft)	99		China	Nanjing	
Dongfeng Plaza Landmark Tower	407 m (1,335 ft)	100		China	Kunming	
One Tower	405.3 m (1,330 ft)	108		Russia	Moscow	
Haiyun Plaza Tower 1	390 m (1,280 ft)	86		China	Rizhao	
Icon Towers 1	384 m (1,260 ft)	77		Indonesia	Jakarta	
Forum 66 Tower 2	384 m (1,260 ft)	76		China	Shenyang	
Guiyang World Trade Center Landmark Tower	380 m (1,250 ft)	92		China	Guiyang	
Greenland Star City Light Tower	379.9 m (1,246 ft)	83		China	Changsha	
Nanchang Ping An Financial Center	373 m (1,224 ft)	72		China	Nanchang	
Kweichow Moutai Tower	369 m (1,211 ft)			China	Guiyang	
VietinBank Business Center Office Tower	363.2 m (1,192 ft)	68		Vietnam	Hanoi	
Wanda One	360 m (1,180 ft)	86		China	Xi'an	
Fosun Bund Center T2	356 m (1,168 ft)			China	Wuhan	
Global Port Tower 1	350 m (1,150 ft)			China	Lanzhou	
Global Port Tower 2	350 m (1,150 ft)			China	Lanzhou	
Guowei ZY Plaza	350 m (1,150 ft)	62		China	Zhuhai	
Baolixian Village Old Reform Project Main Building	350 m (1,150 ft)	70		China	Guangzhou	

== List by continent ==
The following list shows the tallest completed buildings located on each continent listed by greatest to least height (click on name of continent for continent-specific list):

Continent	Building	Height	Floor count	Completed	Country	City
Asia	Burj Khalifa	828 m (2,717 ft)	163	2010	United Arab Emirates	Dubai
North America	One World Trade Center	541.3 m (1,776 ft)	94	2014	United States	New York City
Europe	Lakhta Center	462 m (1,516 ft)	87	2018	Russia	Saint Petersburg
Africa	Iconic Tower	393.8 m (1,292 ft)	77	2023	Egypt	New Administrative Capital
Oceania	Q1 Tower	323 m (1,060 ft)	78	2005	Australia	Gold Coast
South America	Gran Torre Costanera	300 m (980 ft)	64	2012	Chile	Santiago
Antarctica	Vostok Station	17.5 m (57 ft)	2	2023	Russia	-

== Countries with most buildings on list ==
The following list shows the countries whose buildings are featured on the main list of world's tallest buildings (first list featured above), in order from most buildings on the list to least amount of buildings on the list.

Rank	Country / Region	Number of skyscrapers on list	City(s) with most skyscrapers on list	Tallest building	Height of tallest building
1	Mainland China	48	Shenzhen	Shanghai Tower	632 m (2,073 ft)
2	United Arab Emirates	16	Dubai	Burj Khalifa	828 m (2,717 ft)
3	United States	12	New York City	One World Trade Center	541.3 m (1,776 ft)
4	Malaysia	4	Kuala Lumpur	Merdeka Maybank Tower	678.9 m (2,227 ft)
4	Hong Kong	4	Hong Kong	International Commerce Centre	484 m (1588 ft)
6	Russia	3	Moscow	Lakhta Center	462 m (1,516 ft)
7	Saudi Arabia	2	Mecca, Riyadh	Mecca Royal Clock Tower	601 m (1,972 ft)
7	South Korea	2	Seoul, Busan	Lotte World Tower	554.5 m (1,819 ft)
9	Taiwan	1	Taipei	Taipei 101	508 m (1,667 ft)
9	Vietnam	1	Ho Chi Minh City	Landmark 81	461.2 m (1,513 ft)
9	Kuwait	1	Kuwait City	Al Hamra Tower	412.6 m (1,354 ft)
9	Egypt	1	New Administrative Capital	Iconic Tower (Egypt)	393.8 m (1,292 ft)
9	Indonesia	1	Jakarta	Autograph Tower	382.9 m (1,256 ft)
9	Turkey	1	Istanbul	CBRT Tower	352 m (1,155 ft)
9	Canada	1	Toronto	SkyTower at Pinnacle One Yonge	351.4 m (1,153 ft)

== See also ==
- List of tallest structures
- List of tallest freestanding structures
- List of tallest buildings by country
- History of the world's tallest buildings
- History of the world's tallest structures
- Tallest structures by category
- List of visionary tall buildings and structures
