= List of tallest buildings in Suzhou =

Tall buildings in Suzhou
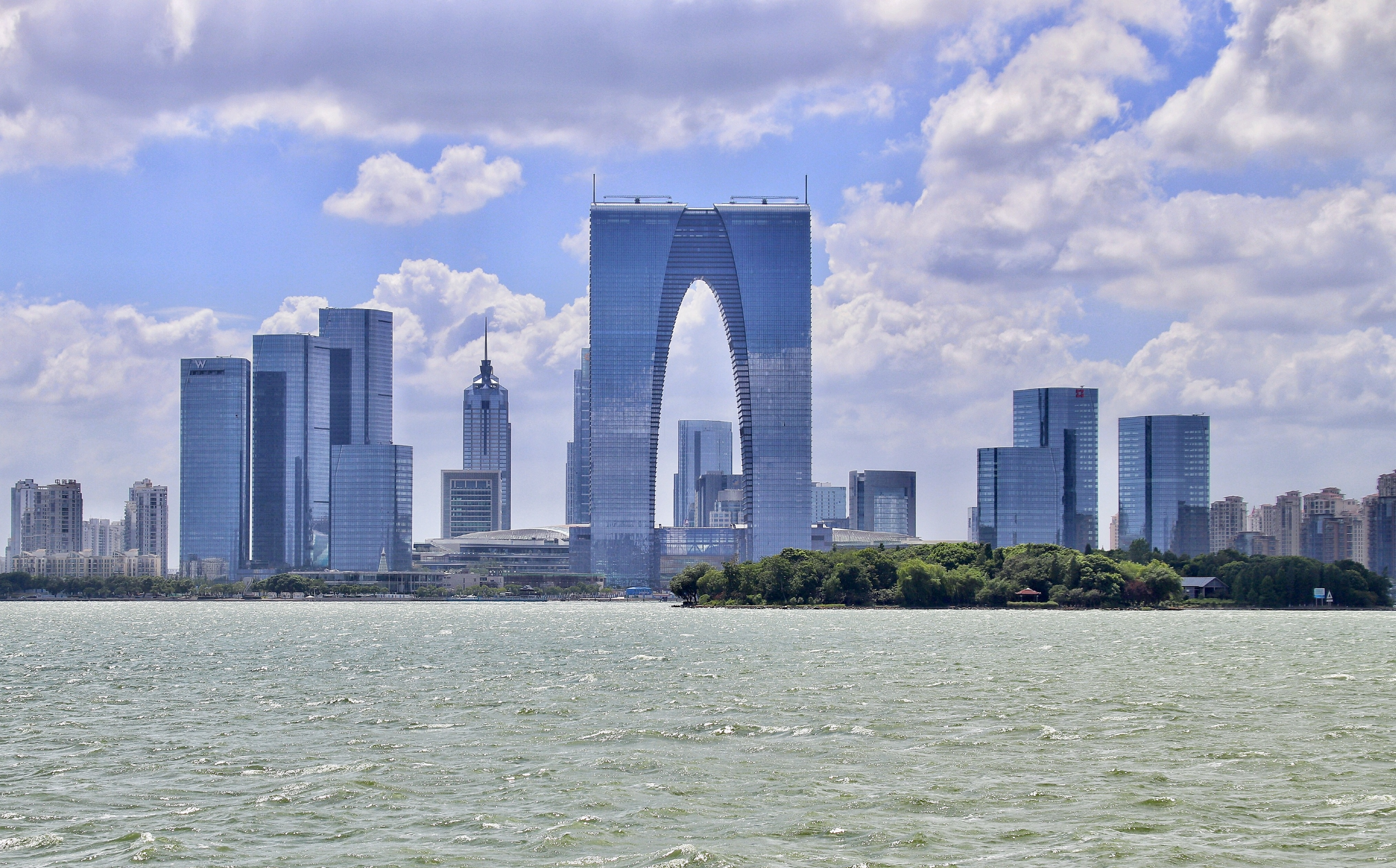
- Suzhou's skyline on Jinji Lake
- Tallest building: Suzhou IFS (2019)
- Tallest building height: 450 m (1,476 ft)
- First 150 m+ building: Suzhou Henghe Plaza (2000)

Number of tall buildings
- Taller than 150 m (492 ft): 46 (2025)
- Taller than 200 m (656 ft): 21 (2025)
- Taller than 300 m (984 ft): 2
- Taller than 400 m (1,312 ft): 1

This list of tallest buildings in Suzhou ranks skyscrapers in the Chinese city of Suzhou, Jiangsu by height. Suzhou is the second-largest urban area in Jiangsu after Nanjing, with an urban population of 6.7 million, and a major economic and cultural center. As part of the Yangtze Delta it is a major economic center and focal point of trade and commerce.

Suzhou's skyscraper boom began in earnest during the 2010s, having built only 5 buildings above 150 m (492 ft) before then. As of 2026, Suzhou has 46 completed skyscrapers above that height, and 21 above 200 m (656 ft). Most skyscrapers in Suzhou are clustered around the Suzhou Industrial Park area, around the shores of Jinji Lake. Since 2019, the tallest building in Suzhou has been the Suzhou IFS at 450 meters (1,476 ft), a 95-storey mixed-use supertall skyscraper located to the east of the lake.

The previous holder for the tallest building from 2015 to 2019 was Gate to the East, a 301.8 m (990 ft) skyscraper directly west of Jinji Lake. These two buildings are the only two supertall skyscrapers in the city. Three more supertall skyscrapers are under construction: Suzhou ICC, Greenland Group Suzhou Center, and Suzhou CSC Fortune Center, the latter of which will become the new tallest building in Suzhou at a height of 460 m (1,509 ft). It is expected to be complete in 2028.

== Tallest buildings ==
This list ranks skyscrapers in Suzhou that stand at least 200 m (656 ft) m tall, based on standard height measurement.

Rank	Building	Image	Height	Floors	Use	Year	Notes
1	Suzhou IFS		450 m	95	Mixed-use	2019	
2	Suzhou ICC		303.2 m	68	Mixed-use	2025	
3	Gate to the East		301.8 m	66	Mixed-use	2015	
4	Suzhou RunHua Global Building A		282 m	49	Office	2010	
5	Suzhou Center		268 m	52	Mixed-use	2013	
6	EVOC International Financial Center		257.1 m	56	Office	2024	
7	Golden Eagle Plaza		252 m	55	Multiple	2016	
8	Suzhou RunHua Global Building B		240 m	54	Residential	2010	
9	Suzhou Xingli Hotel		234 m	57	Hotel	2023	
10	Suzhou Xindi Center		232 m	54	Mixed-use	2005	
11	International Fortune Plaza Tower A		230 m	44	Office	2016	
12	CSSD Plaza		222 m	47	Office	2015	
13	Suzhou Center Plaza 1		221.6 m	56	Residential	2017	
14	Tiandu Plaza Tower 1		217 m	-	Office	2018	
15	Days Mansion Tower A		217 m	-	Office	2019	
16	The Suzhou Modern Media Plaza 1		214.8 m	45	Office	2015	
17	Suzhou Longfor Centre		212.5 m	46	Mixed-use	2021	
18	Metropolitan Tower A		210 m	52	Residential	2009	
19	Metropolitan Tower B		210 m	52	Residential	2009	
20	Hengli Center 1		209 m	51	Office	2020	
21	Zhonghai Building		207.6 m	53	Mixed-use	2024	
22	Phoenix International Book City East Tower		200 m	42	Office	2013	

== Tallest under construction or proposed ==
=== Under construction ===
The following table lists buildings that are under construction in Suzhou and are planned to rise at least 200 m (656 feet).

Name	Height m / feet	Floors	Use	Year	Notes
Suzhou CSC Fortune Center	460 m	100	Mixed-use	2028	
Greenland Group Suzhou Center	358 m	77	Mixed-use	2026	
Hengli Bay Enterprise Center Tower 5	268.6 m	63	Office	2025	
Hengli Bay Enterprise Center Tower 6	268.6 m	63	Office	2025	
Hengtai Free Trade Centre Northeast Tower	229.1 m	46	Mixed-use	2025	
Jianwu Plaza Block E	222.8 m	50	Office	2025	
Suzhou Jinfeng Jinrui Center	220.9 m	52	Office	2025	
Suzhou FTZ Business Center Tower 1	220 m	46	Office	2025	
Hengli Bay Enterprise Center Tower 1	207.2 m	51	Office	2025	
Hengli Bay Enterprise Center Tower 2	207.2 m	51	Office	2025	
Hengli Bay Enterprise Center Tower 3	207.2 m	51	Office	2025	
Hengli Bay Enterprise Center Tower 4	207.2 m	51	Office	2025	
