= Gate to the East =

Supertall skyscraper in Suzhou, Jiangsu, China

Gate to the East (东方之门)
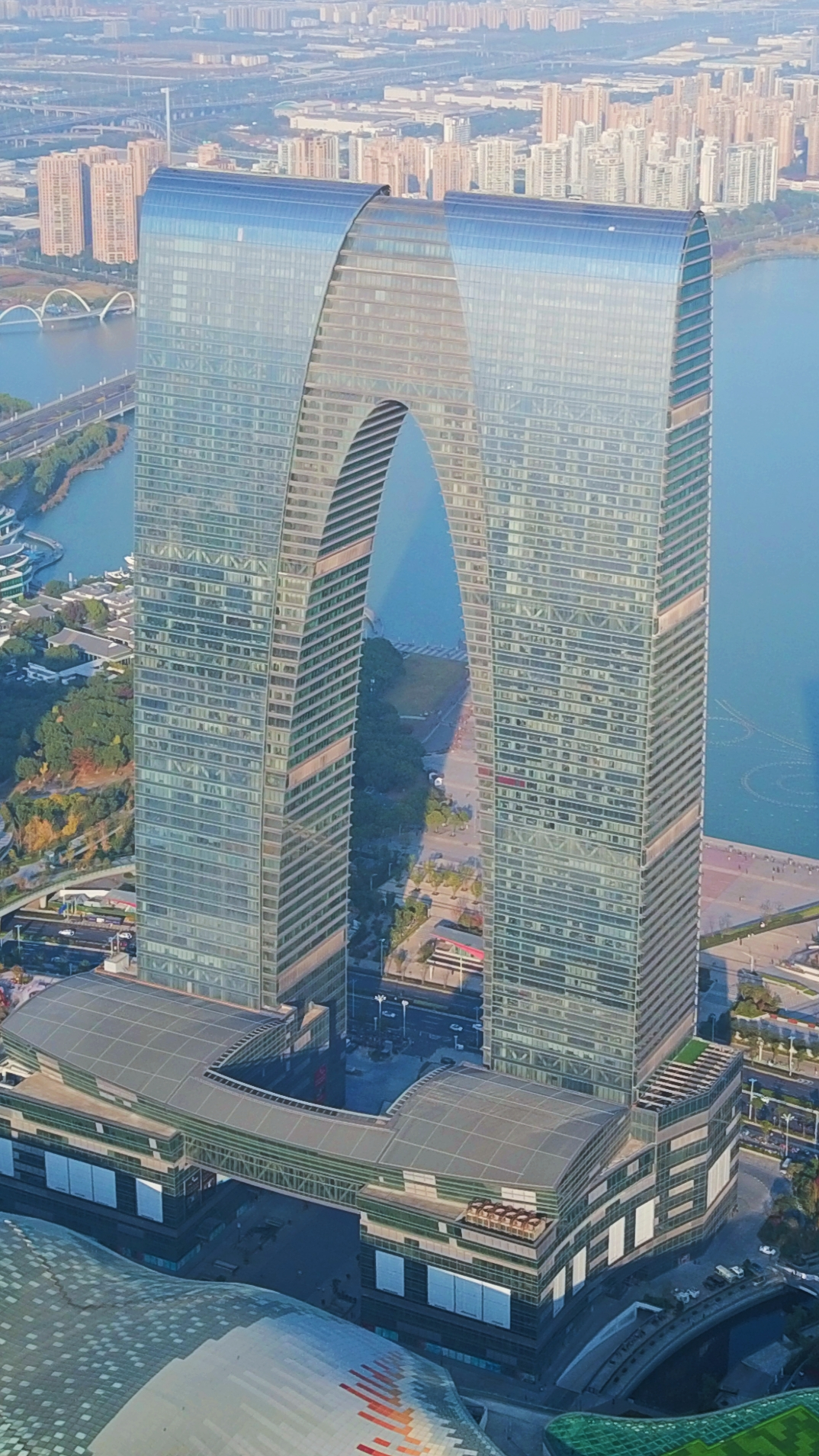
- Gate to the East in Suzhou in 2019
- Alternative names: Gate of the Orient or The Pants Building

General information
- Status: Completed
- Type: commercial, transportation
- Location: 199 Xinggang Street, Suzhou Industrial Park, Suzhou, Jiangsu, China
- Coordinates: 31°19′08″N 120°40′29″E
- Construction started: June 7, 2004
- Completed: May 13, 2016
- Cost: $700,000,000 (USD) (Budget)

Height
- Height: 301.8 m (990.2 ft)

Technical details
- Size: 340,000 square metres (3,700,000 sq ft)
- Floor count: 68
- Floor area: 450,000 m^{2} (4,800,000 ft^{2})
- Lifts/elevators: 6

Design and construction
- Architect: RMJM

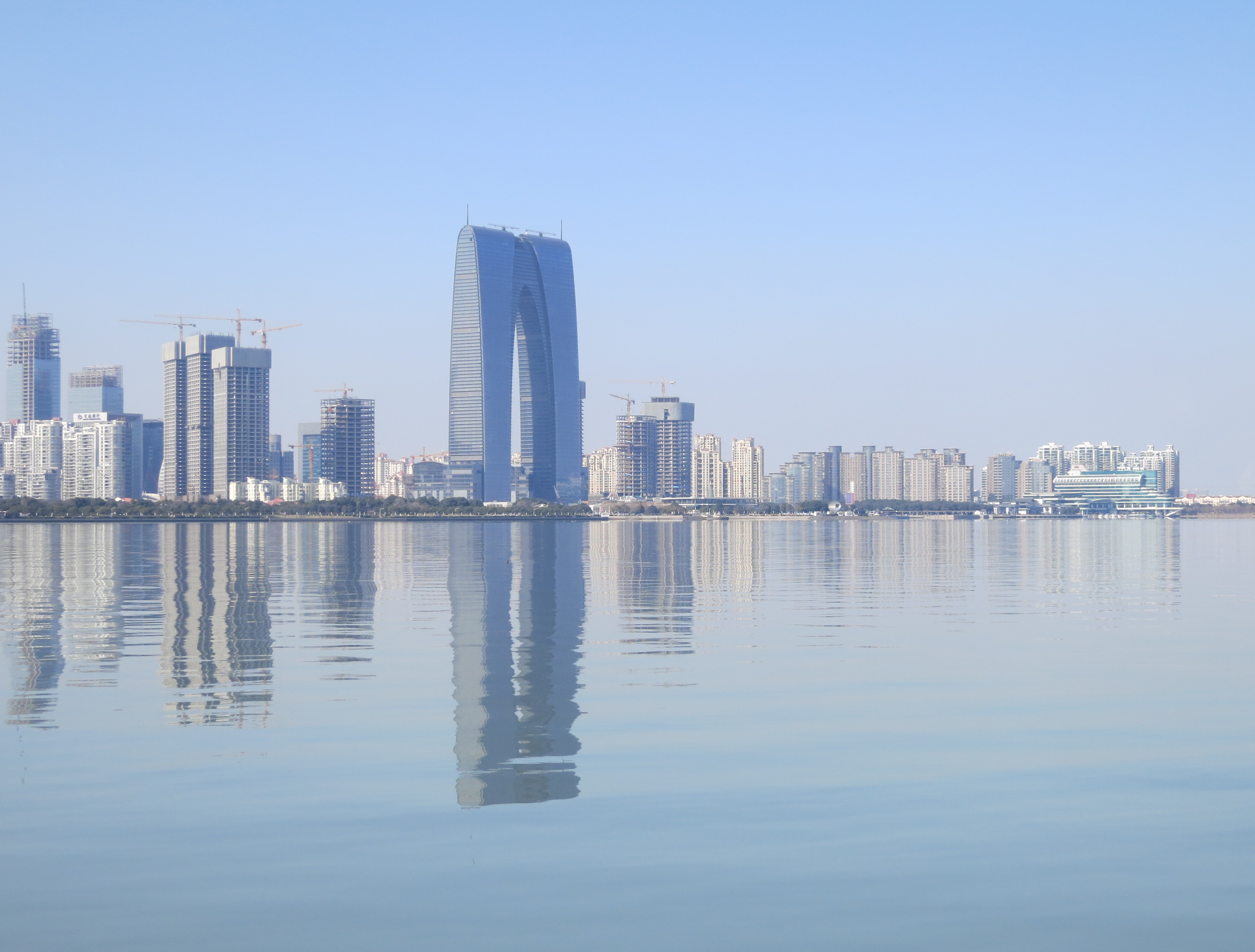
The Gate of the Orient on the west bank of Jinji Lake

The Gate to the East, also known as the Gate of the Orient, (simplified Chinese: 东方之门; traditional Chinese: 東方之門; pinyin: dōng fāng zhī mén) is the second tallest building in Suzhou, Jiangsu, China behind Suzhou IFS. It is intended to be a symbol of a gateway to the city which emphasizes the city's continuing significance in modern China. With a height of 301.8 metres (990 ft), the building is located in the heart of Suzhou's China–Singapore Suzhou Industrial Park (SIP) district. Construction began in 2004 and was completed in 2016 for $700 million USD. Its location precisely indicates the intersection of the historical east-west axis of Suzhou Old Town with the west bank of Jinji Lake.

The design has been subjected to mockery by many Chinese netizens and western mass media as well, as "resembling a pair of trousers". The landmark has thus led to a slew of internet parodies.

There is a low-rise building extending from the base of the structure that, together with the high-rise, makes up the Gate of the Orient a mixed-use development that includes office spaces, residential serviced apartments, a luxury hotel, and a large shopping mall.

== Transport ==
- Suzhou Metro:
  Line 1
  Line 3
  at Dongfangzhimen Station

== See also ==
- Architecture of China
- List of tallest buildings in China
- Suzhou Zhongnan Center
- CCTV Headquarters
