= Guiyang International Financial Center =

Supertall skyscraper in Guiyang, Guizhou, China

Coordinates: 26°38′49.3″N 106°38′55.9″E

Guiyang International Financial Center Tower 1
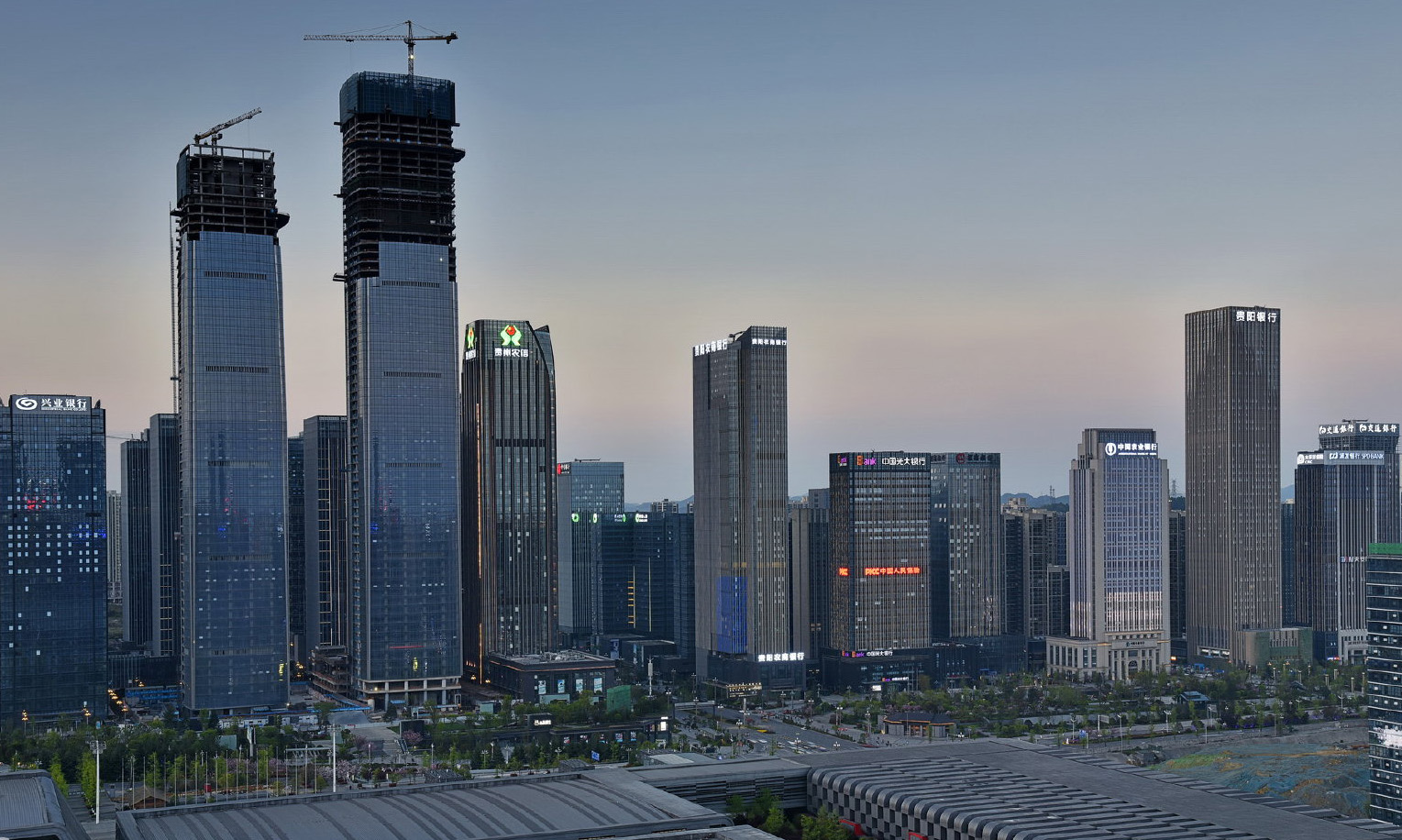
- Interactive map of the Guiyang International Financial Center Tower 1 area

General information
- Status: Completed
- Type: Mixed use: Hotel, Office
- Construction started: 2016
- Completed: 2020

Height
- Height: 401 m (1,316 ft)

Technical details
- Floor count: 79
- Floor area: 190,000 m^{2} (2,000,000 sq ft)
- Lifts/elevators: 53

Guiyang International Financial Center Tower 2
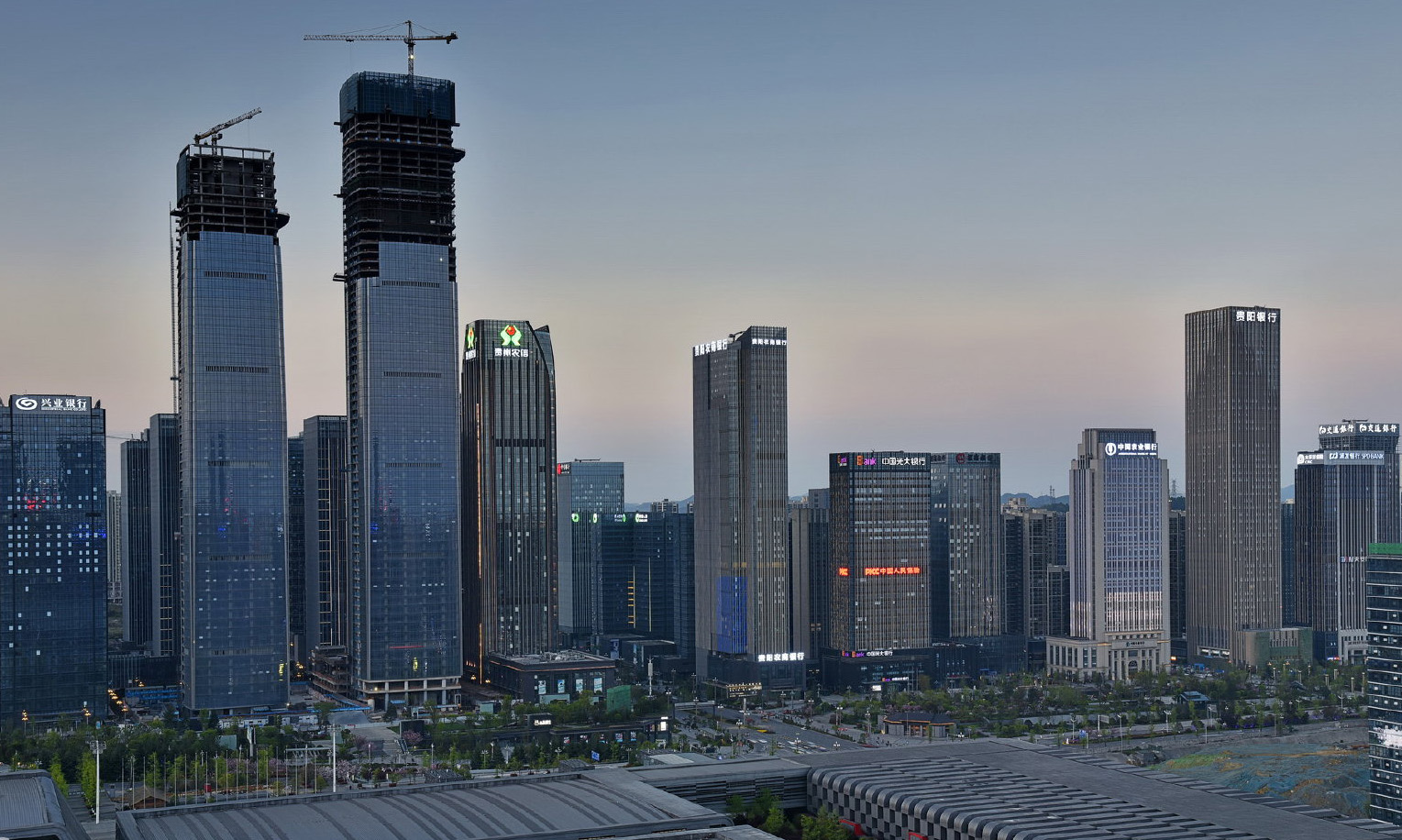
- Interactive map of the Guiyang International Financial Center Tower 2 area

General information
- Status: Completed
- Type: Office
- Construction started: 2016
- Completed: 2020

Height
- Height: 275 m (902 ft)

Technical details
- Floor count: 54
- Lifts/elevators: 25

Guiyang International Financial Center is a skyscraper complex in Guiyang, China. The complex consists of two buildings, Tower 1 at 401 metres (1,316 ft) and Tower 2 at 275 metres (902 ft). The complex was completed in 2020.
