= Suzhou IFS =

Supertall skyscraper in Suzhou, Jiangsu, China

Coordinates: 31°19′27″N 120°42′46″E

Suzhou International Financial Square 苏州国际金融中心
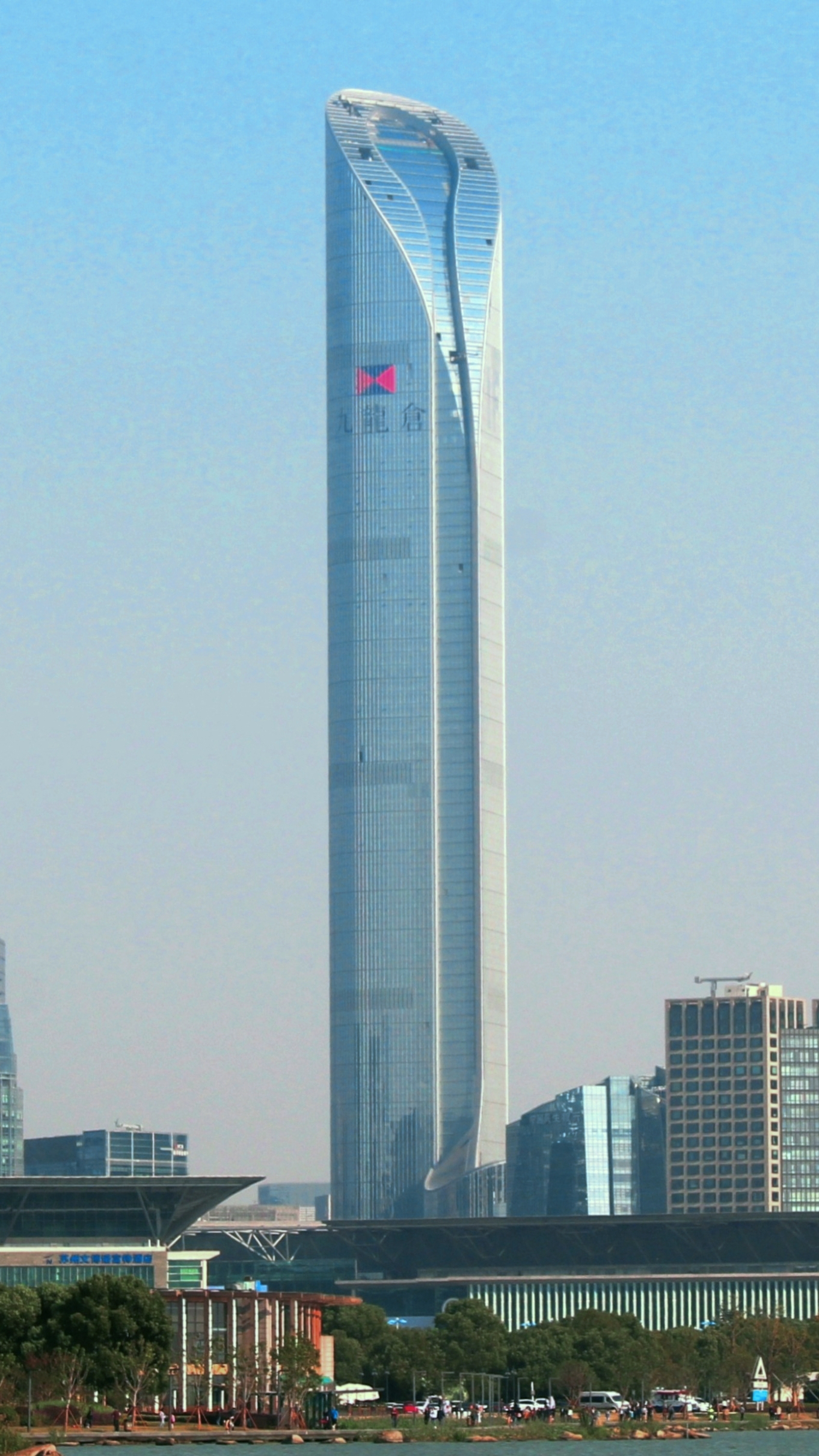
- Suzhou IFS (October 2018)
- Interactive map of the Suzhou International Financial Square 苏州国际金融中心 area

General information
- Status: Completed
- Location: Suzhou Industrial Park, Jiangsu, China
- Construction started: 30 December 2012
- Completed: 2019
- Owner: The Wharf (Holdings)

Height
- Architectural: 450 metres (1,476.4 ft)
- Top floor: 399.1 metres (1,309.4 ft)

Technical details
- Floor count: 95
- Floor area: 393,200 m^{2} (4,232,400 sq ft)
- Lifts/elevators: 62

Design and construction
- Architects: Wong Tung & Partners / Wong & Tung International Ltd; Kohn Pedersen Fox Associates
- Developer: Suzhou Gao Long Property Development Co., Ltd.

Suzhou IFS
- Simplified Chinese: 苏州国际金融中心
- Traditional Chinese: 蘇州國際金融中心
Transcriptions
Standard Mandarin
- Hanyu Pinyin: Sūzhōu Guójì Jīnróng Zhōngxīn

Suzhou International Financial Square (Chinese: 苏州国际金融中心) is a supertall skyscraper designed by Kohn Pedersen Fox Associates in the Suzhou Industrial Park, Jiangsu, located to the east of Jinji Lake. It is the tallest building in Suzhou. It is a multi-purpose building which includes apartments, hotels and offices.

== Gallery ==
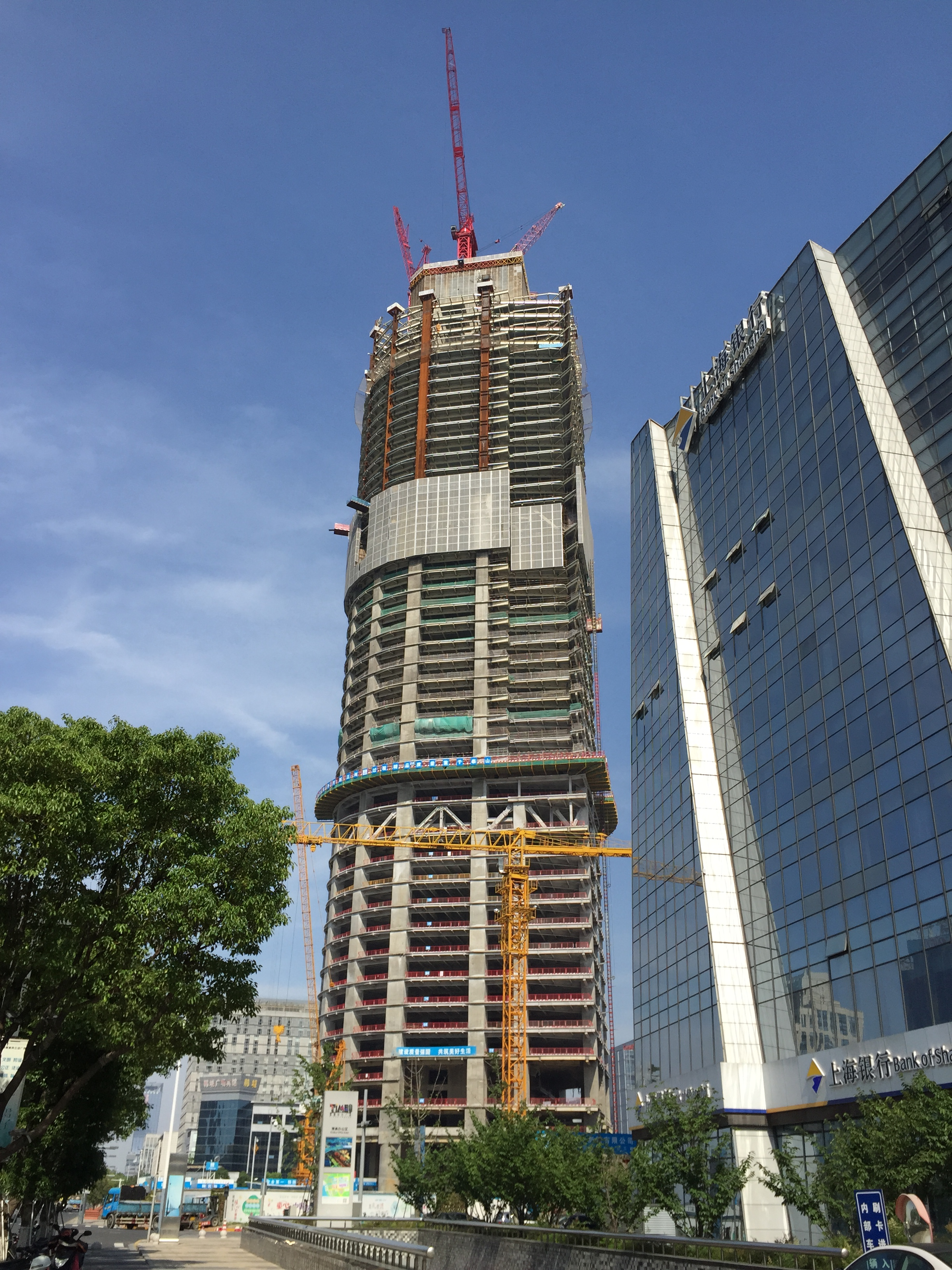
June 2015

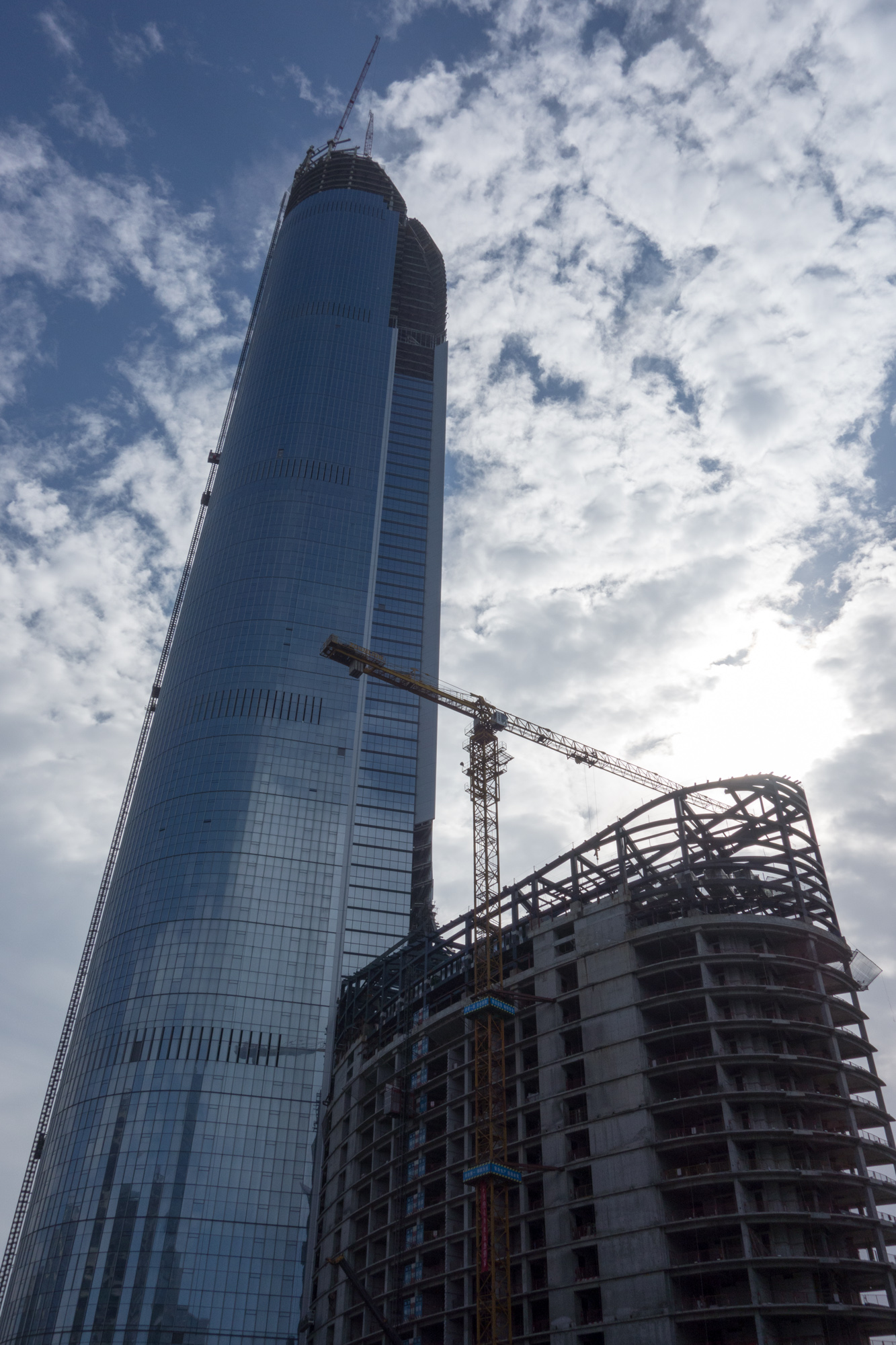
October 2016

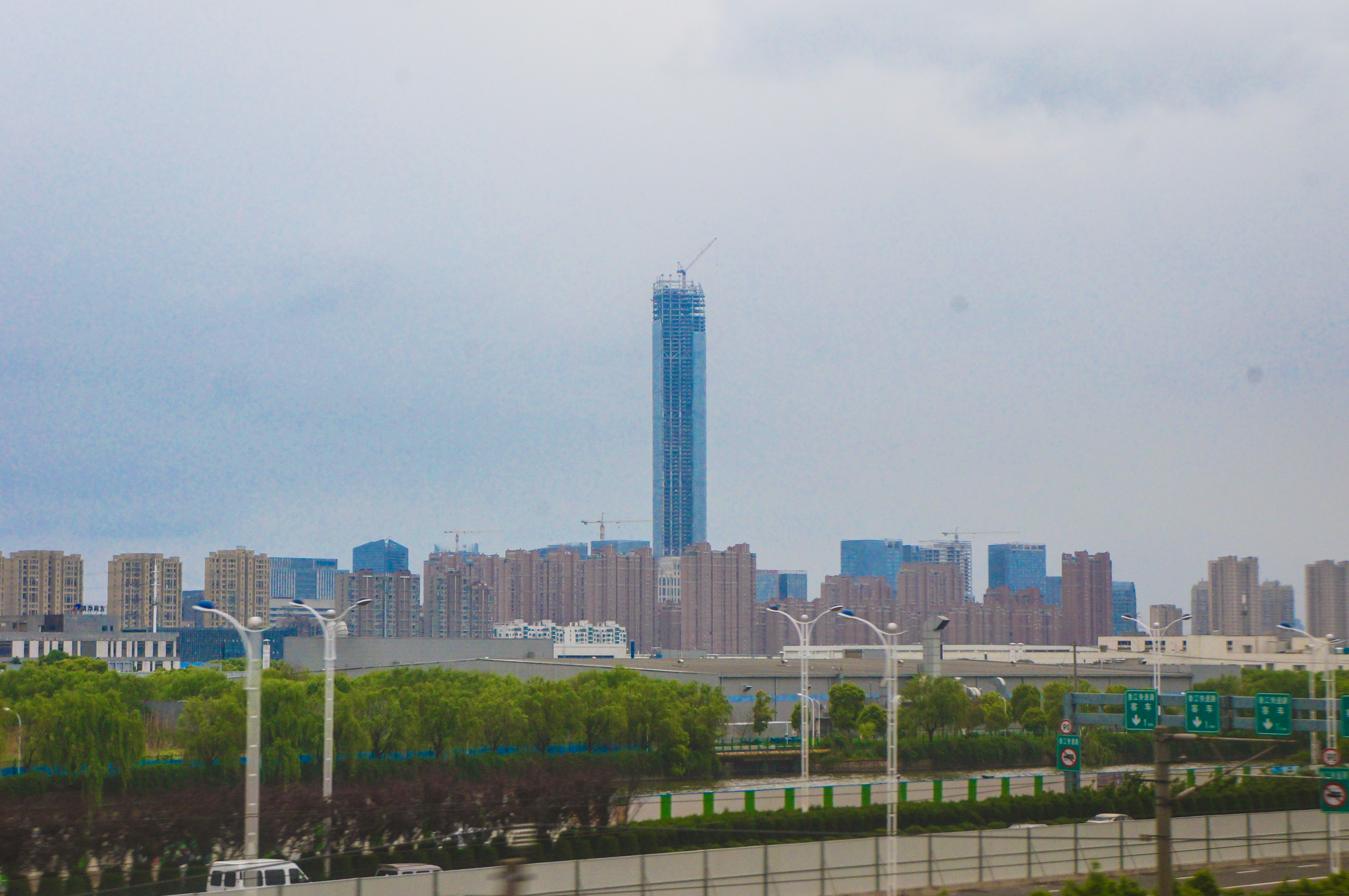
May 2017

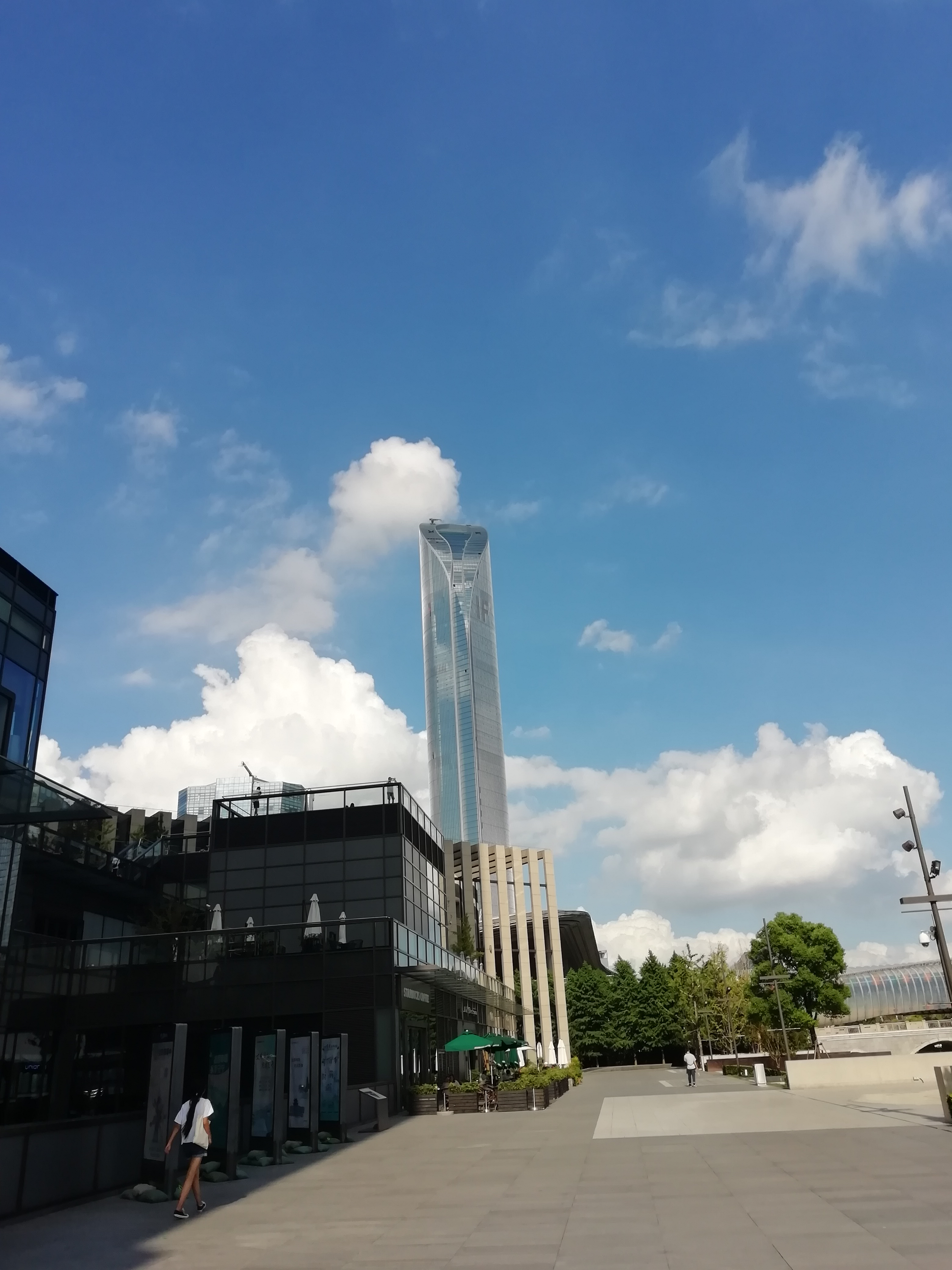
August 2018

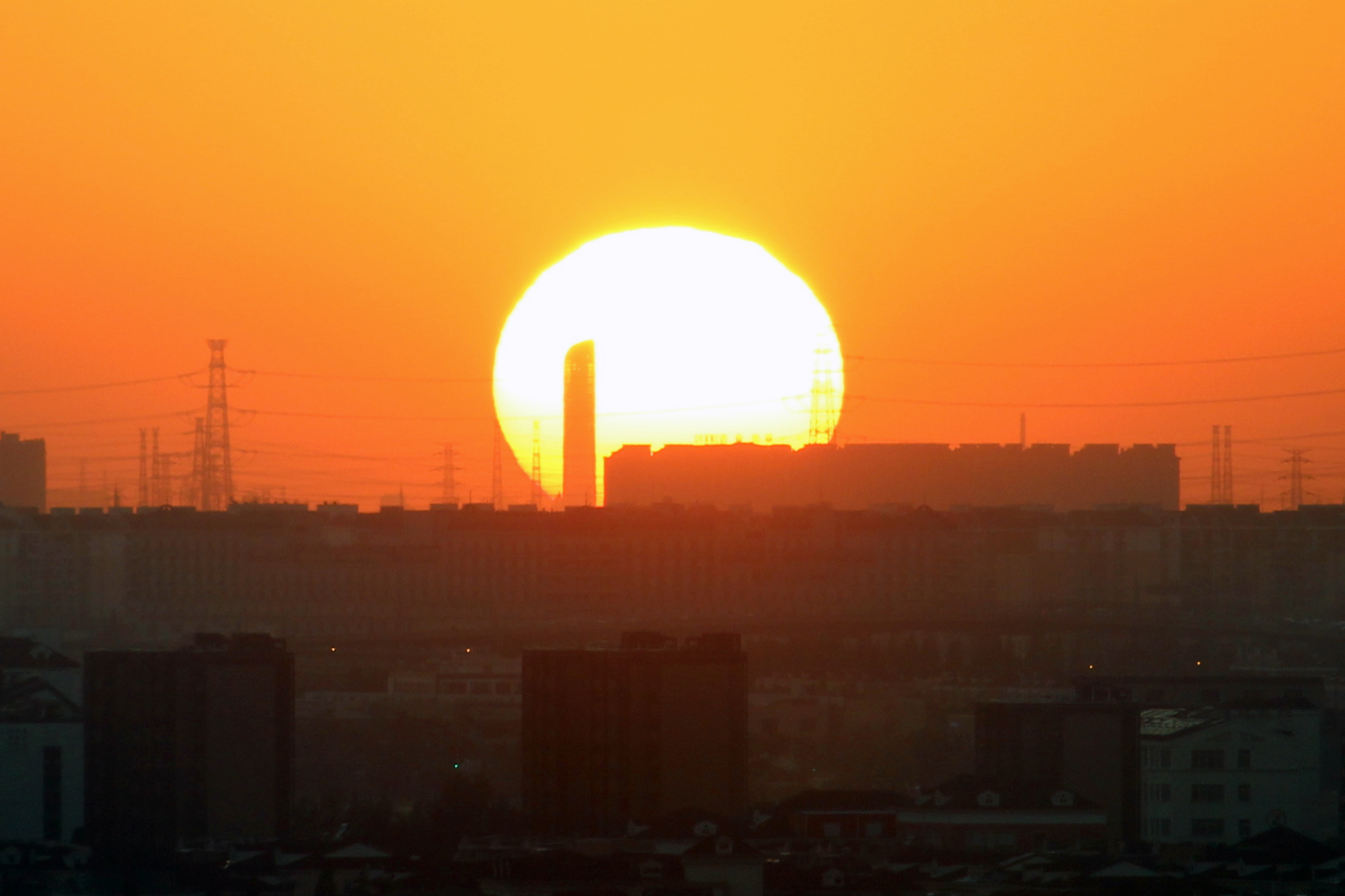
Seen from Shanghai Changning District (~60–70 km)

== See also ==
- Suzhou Zhongnan Center
- List of tallest buildings in Suzhou
- List of tallest buildings in China
