= Suzhou Center Mall =

Shopping mall in Suzhou, Jiangsu, China

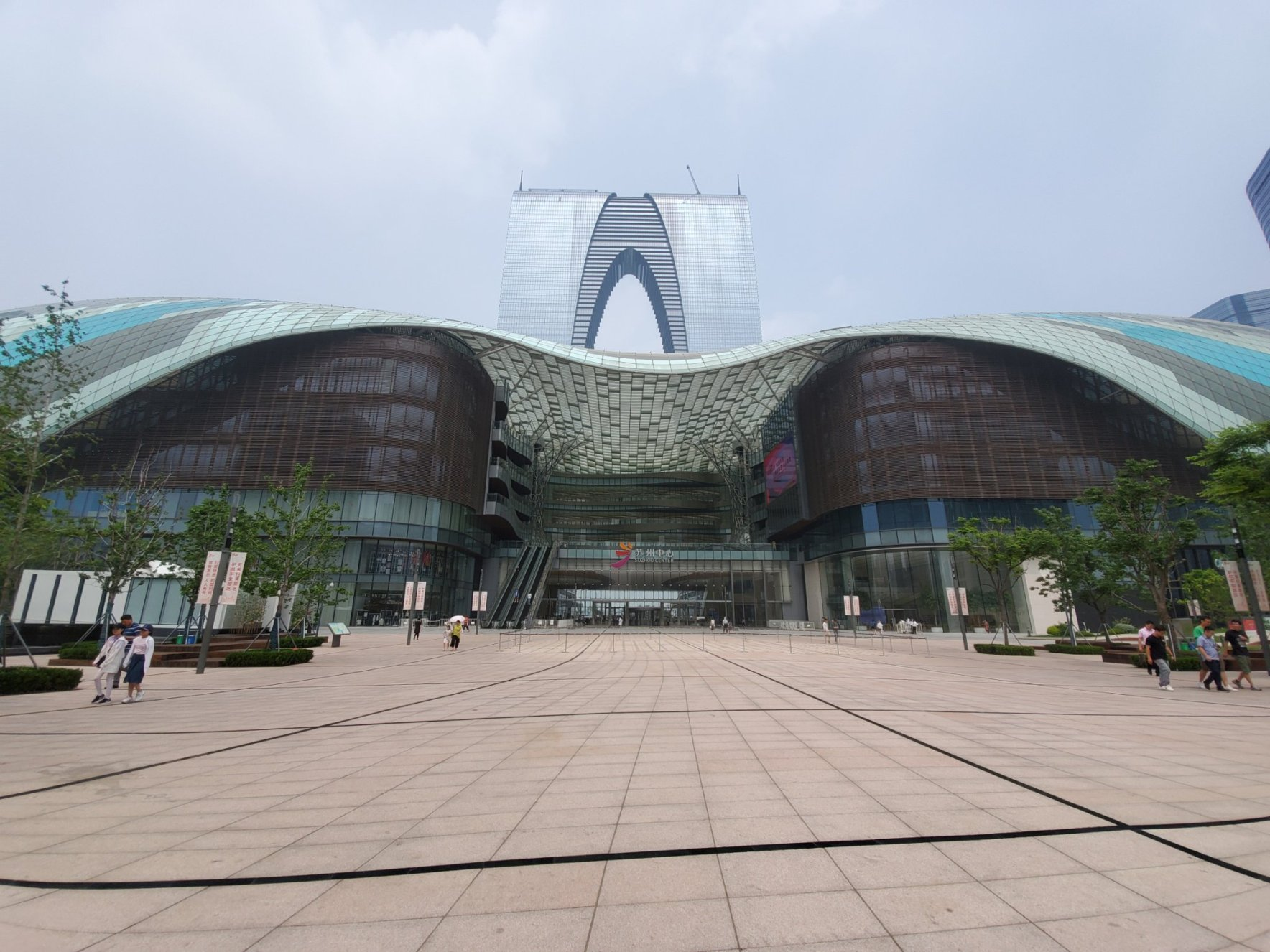
Suzhou Center Mall Entrance

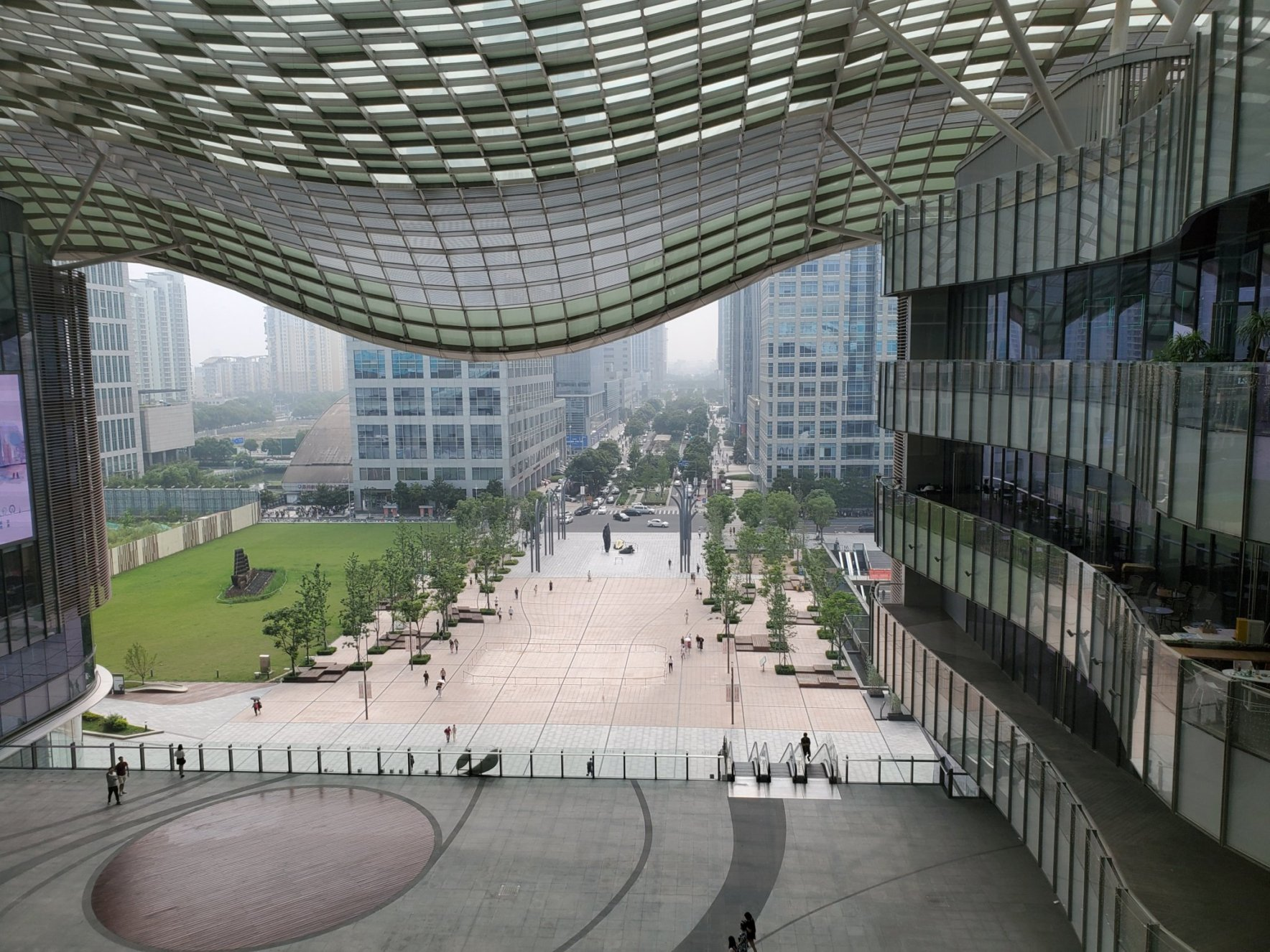
Suzhou Center Mall overlooking the front entrance

Suzhou Center Mall is a large shopping mall located in Suzhou, China. The mall opened in November 2017 and was developed by the Singaporean Management company CapitaLand. The mall spans over 300,000 square meters and houses over 600 different branded stores. It includes famous brands such as Apple and Microsoft.

The Suzhou Center mall is currently the largest mall in Suzhou. With an east and west area it has a big lobby in the center usually containing special events such as sponsors or Chinese festivals. The mall is 6 stories tall and goes down another few stories for parking. Suzhou Center features attractions such as an area for horse riding lessons, an Olympic sized ice rink, grocery store, arcade, bubble tea stores and more.

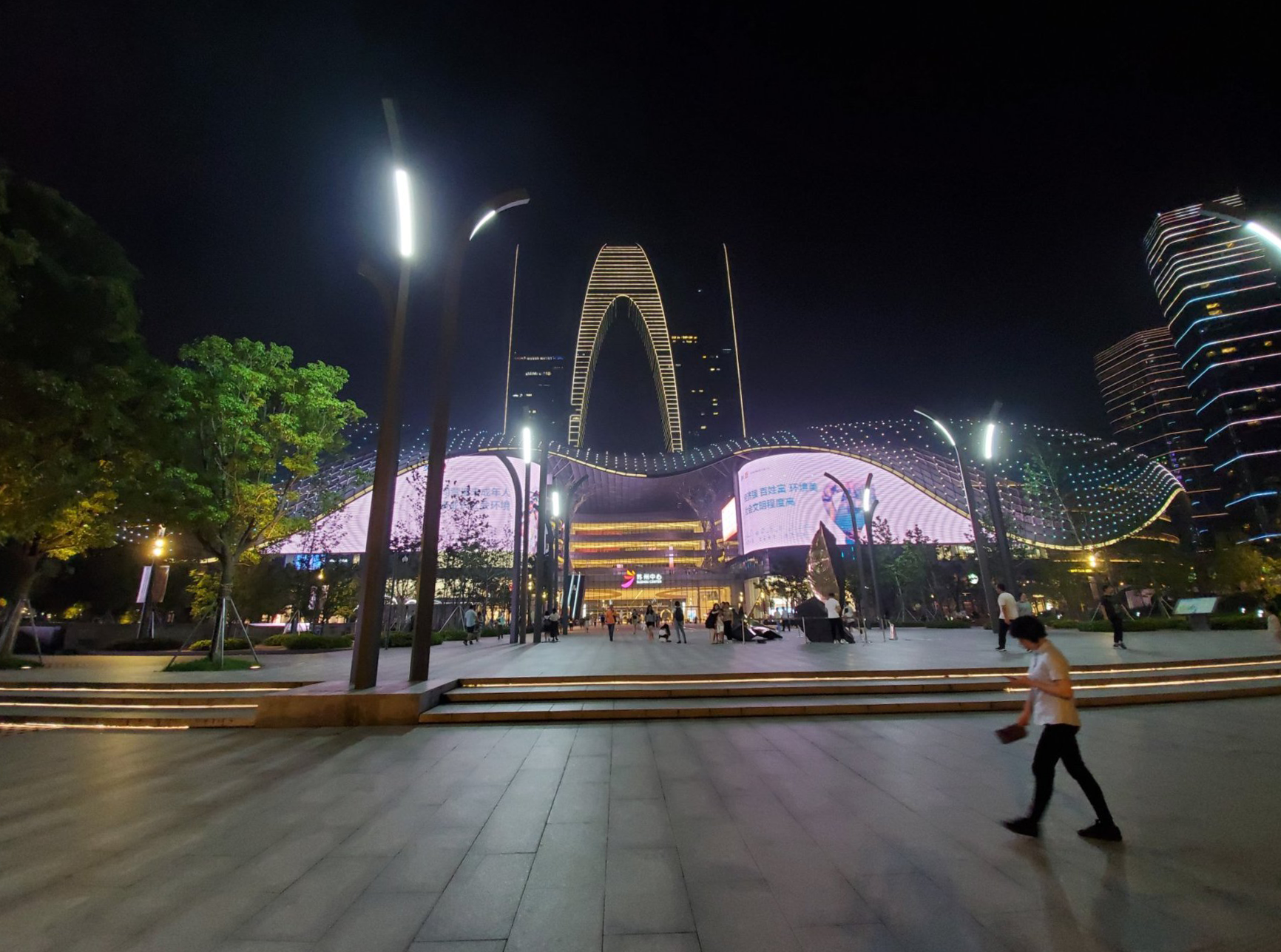
Suzhou Center Mall at night

In 2018 the mall won the MAPIC Award for "Best New Shopping Center" which recognizes innovation and quality in the global retail real estate industry.

Suzhou Center Mall attractions

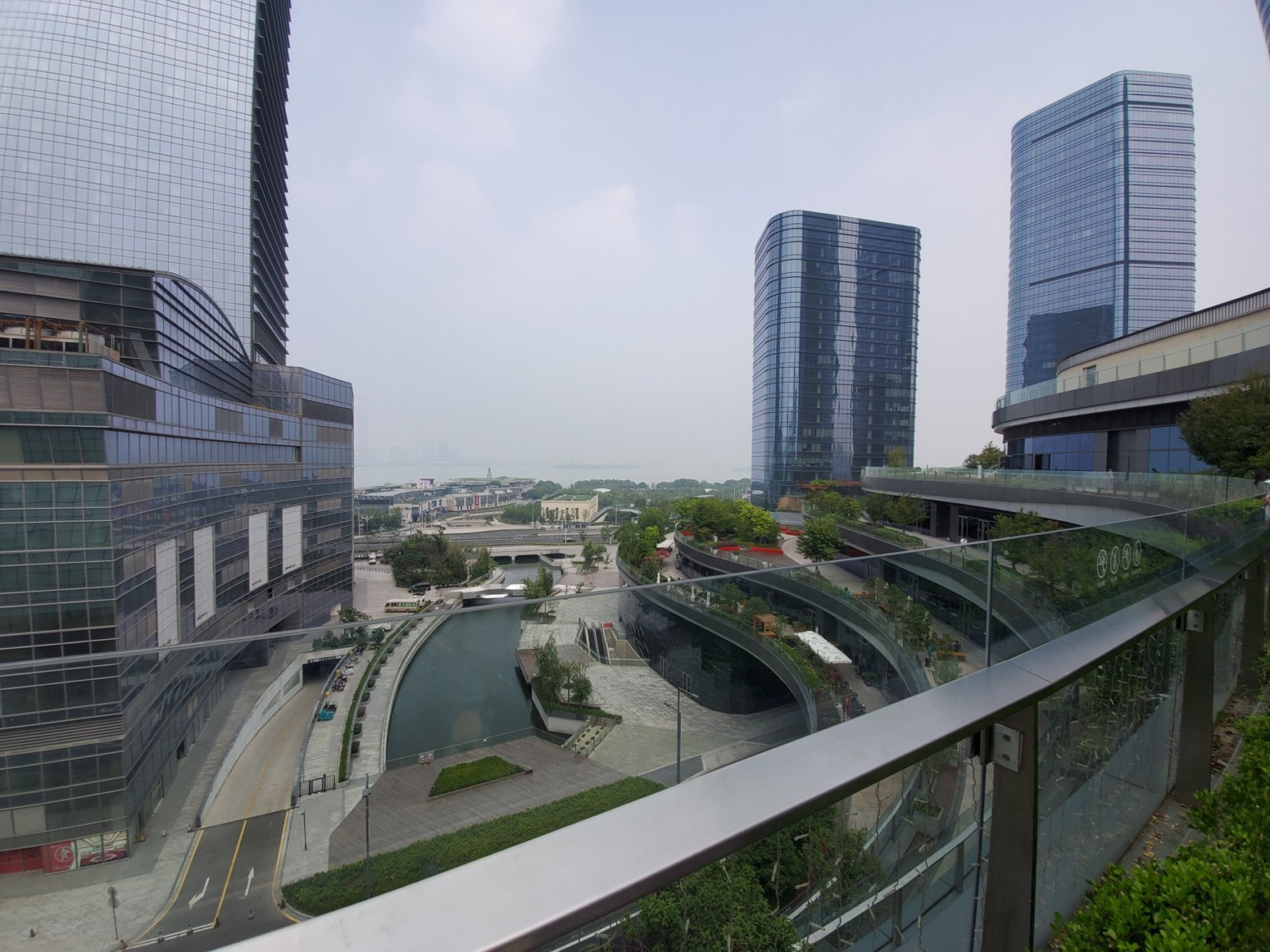
Outdoor Greenery

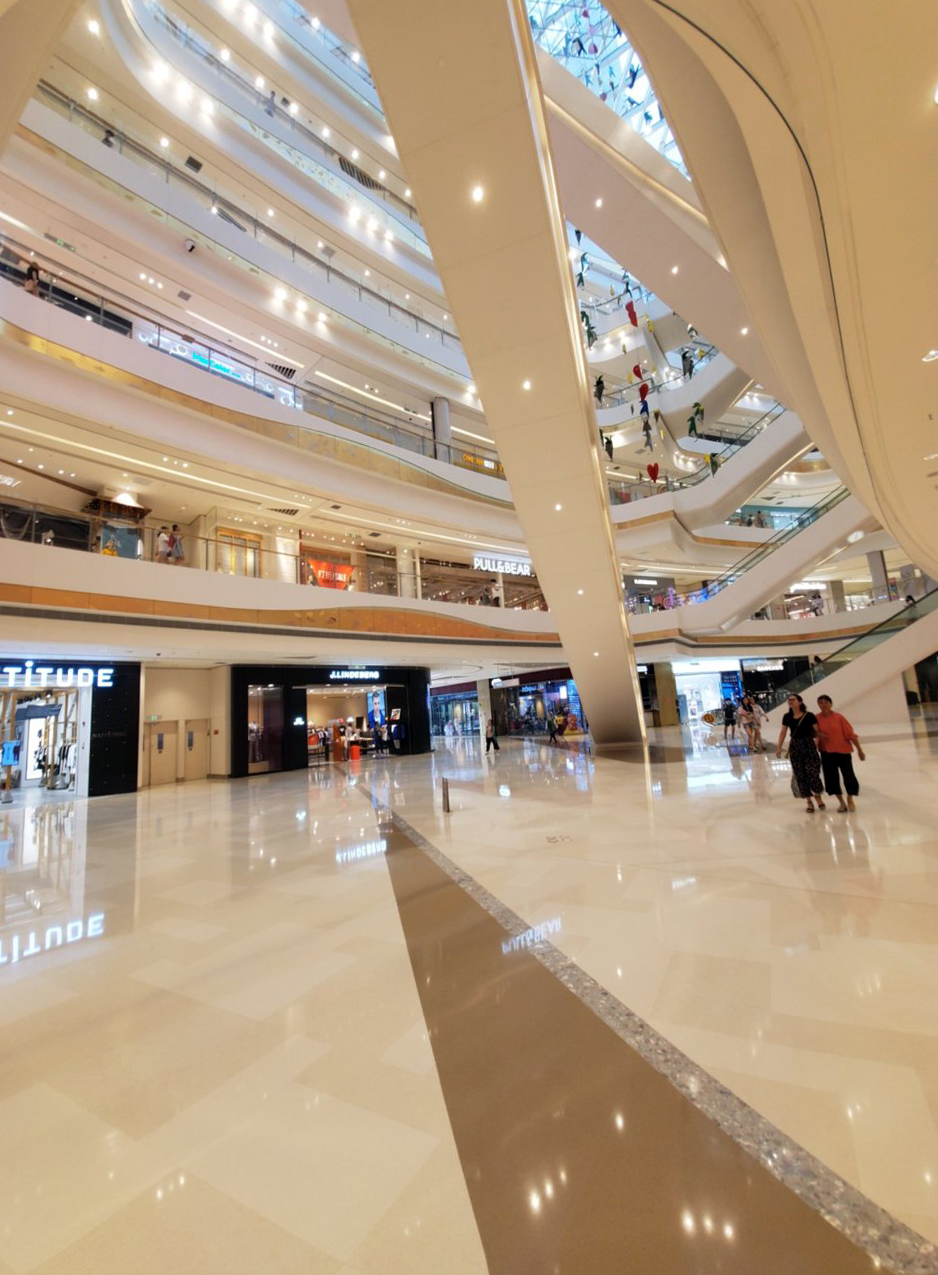
Interior View

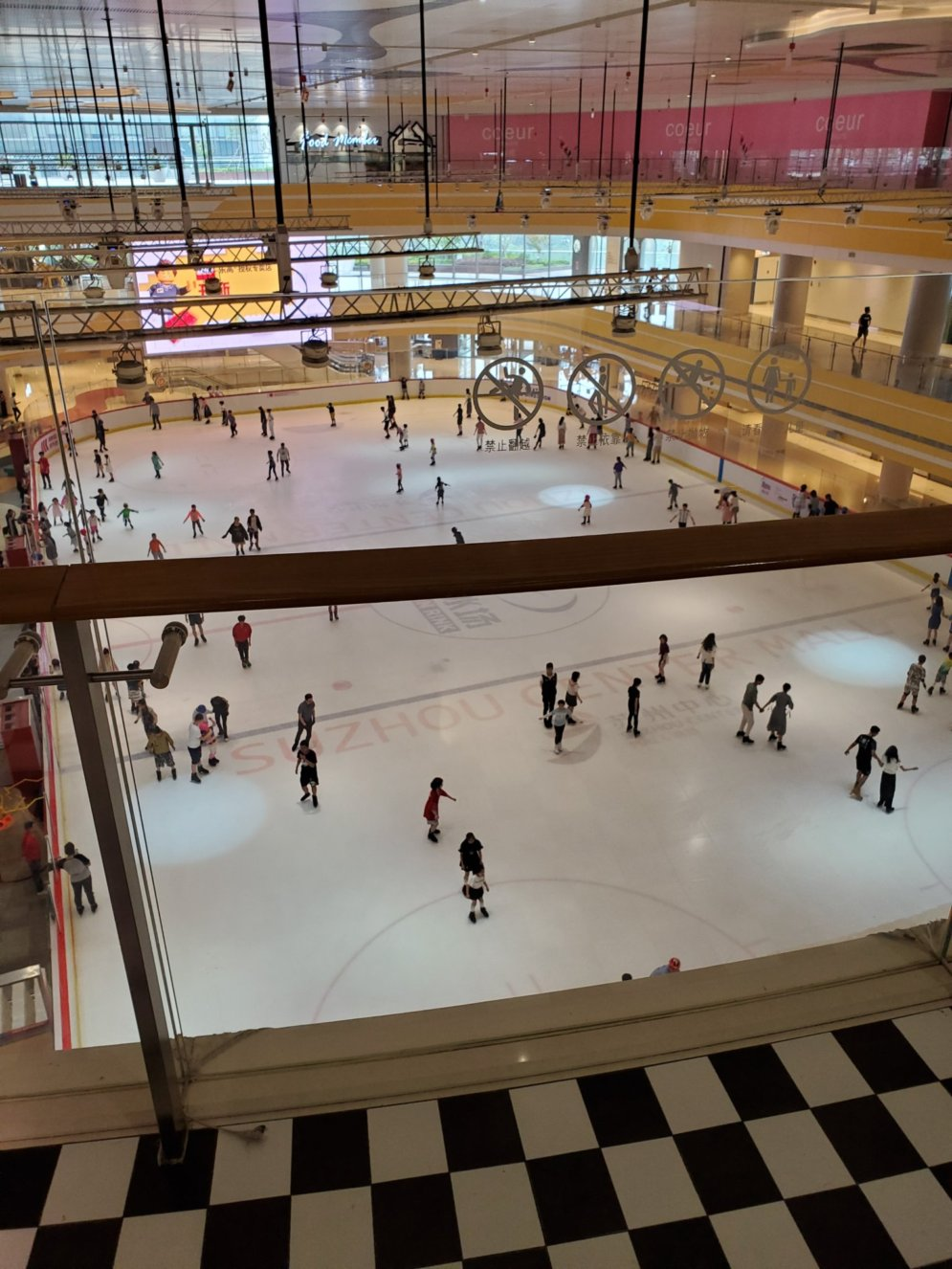
Ice rink

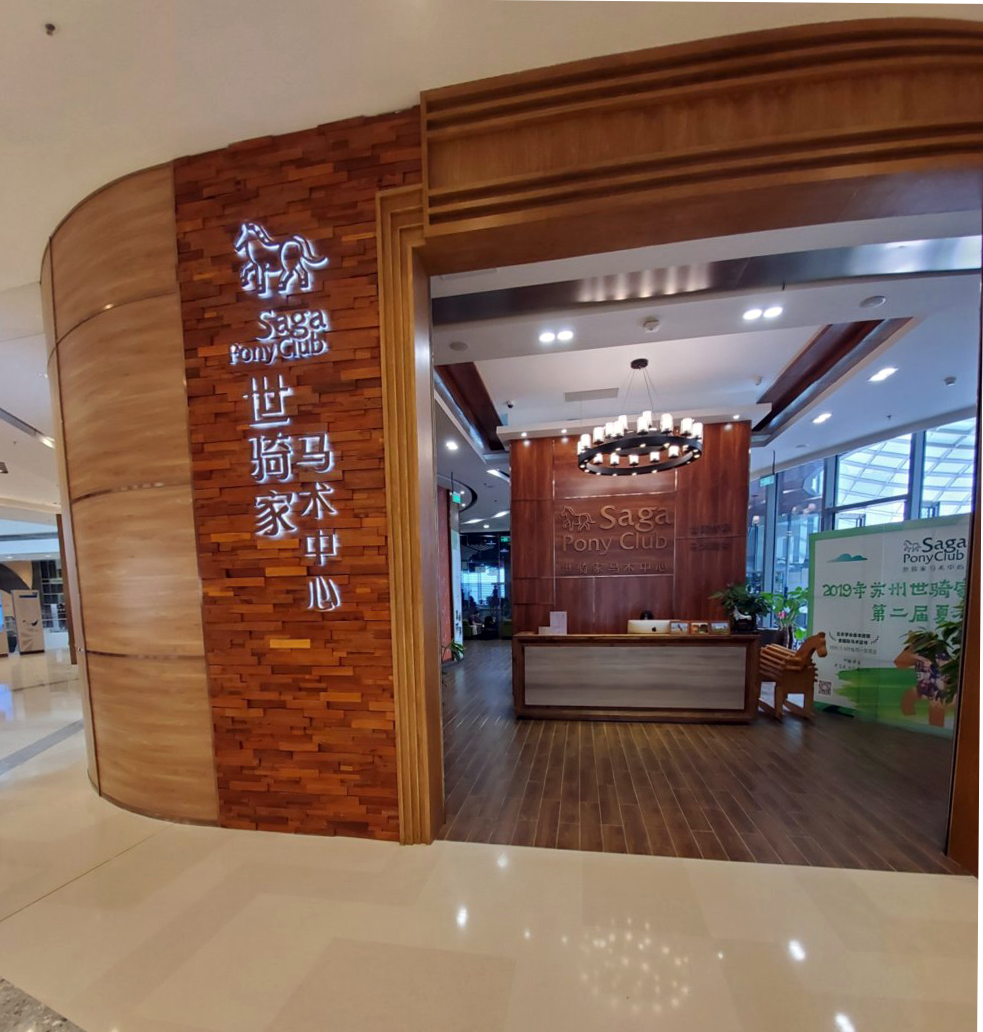
Horse Riding lessons

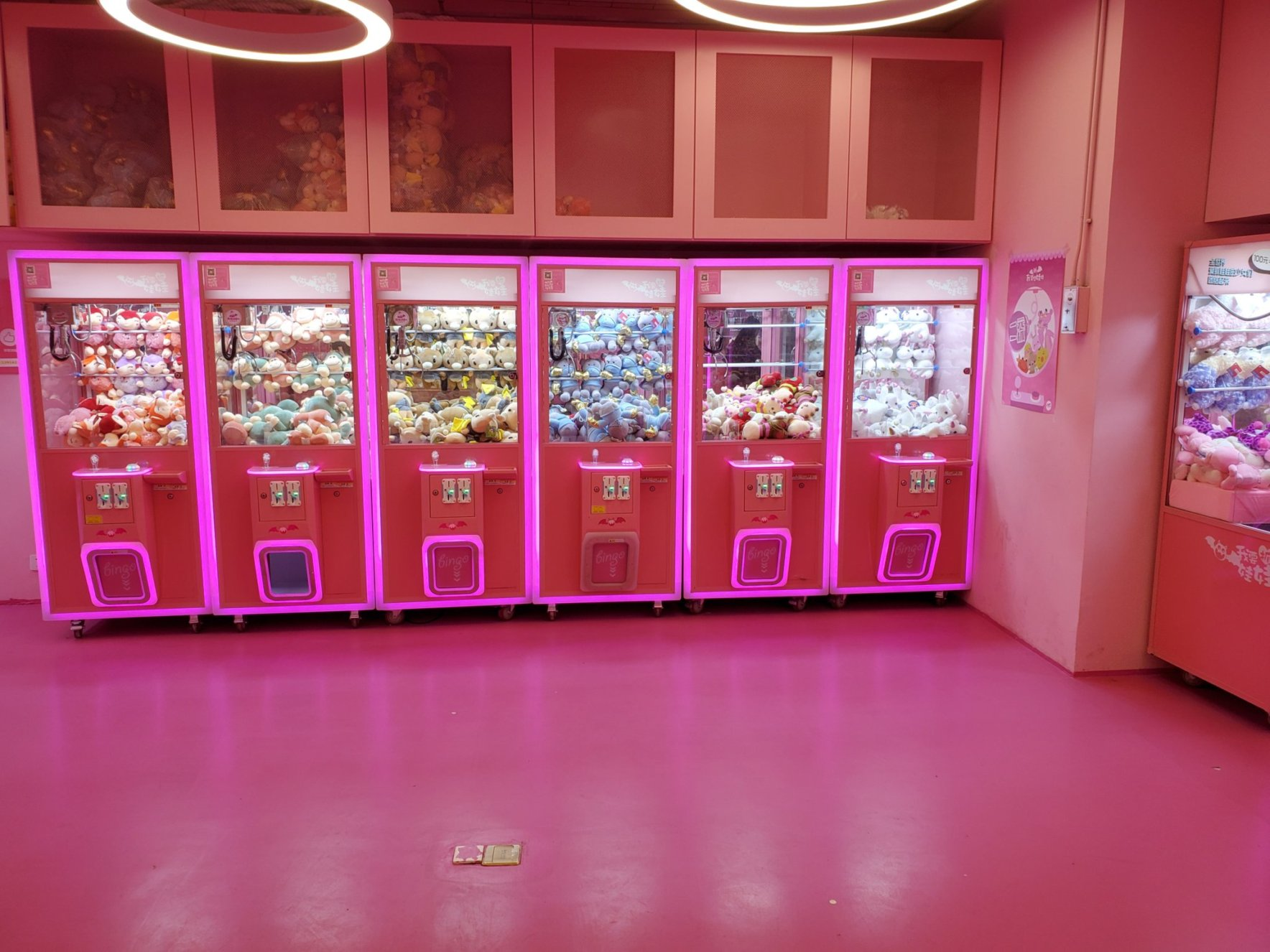
Pink Panther claw games
