= Minying International Trade Center T2 =

Supertall skyscraper in Dongguan, Guangdong, China

Coordinates: 23°00′51″N 113°45′30″E

Minying Guomao Center T2
- 民盈国贸中心T2
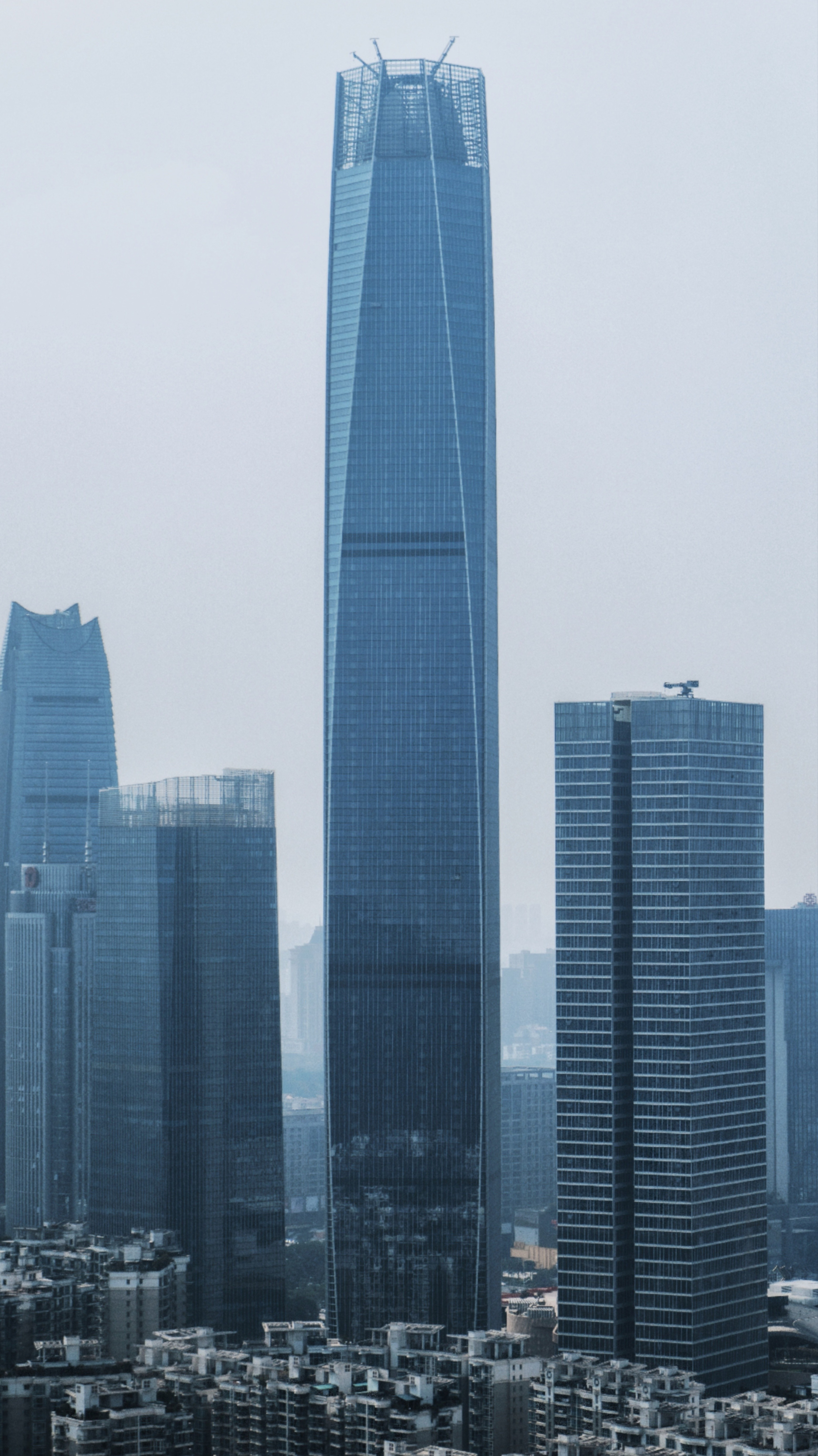
- Minying International Trade Center T2 in 2022
- Interactive map of the Minying Guomao Center T2 area
- Former names: Dongguan International Trade Center T1

General information
- Status: Completed
- Type: Office
- Location: Dongguan, China
- Construction started: November 21, 2014
- Topped-out: January 2020
- Opened: September 26, 2021
- Owner: Zhiujuang Huajiang

Height
- Height: 422.6 m (1,386 ft)

Technical details
- Floor count: 96
- Floor area: 215,000 m^{2} (2,310,000 ft^{2})

Design and construction
- Architect: 5+design

Minying International Trade Center T2 is a supertall skyscraper in Dongguan, Guangdong, China. It has a height of 423 m. Construction began in 2014 and was completed in 2021. The 96-floor tower opened on September 26, 2021, and is the fourteenth-tallest building in China and the tallest building in Dongguan.
