= Suzhou Zhongnan Center =

On hold skyscraper in Suzhou, China

Coordinates: 31.3180°N 120.6730°E

- 苏州中南中心
- Rendering of the former design of the Suzhou Zhongnan Center

General information
- Status: On-hold
- Type: Mixed-use: Hotel; Office; Residential
- Location: Suzhou Industrial Park, Suzhou, Jiangsu, China
- Construction started: 2020
- Estimated completion: 2028
- Opening: 2028
- Owner: Zhongnan Group

Height
- Architectural: 499.2 m (1,638 ft)
- Tip: 499.2 m (1,638 ft)

Technical details
- Floor count: 103

Design and construction
- Architects: Gensler; East China Architectural Design
- Developer: Zhongnan Group

Suzhou Zhongnan Center (Chinese: 苏州中南中心) is a stalled 499.2-metre (1,638 ft) tall building in Suzhou Industrial Park (SIP), Suzhou, Jiangsu, China. Original plans called for a height of 729 metres (2,391.7 ft), but plans were scrapped in 2019 in compliance with China's ban on buildings taller than 500 metres (1,641 ft). The new tower was proposed in 2019 and construction started less than a year later, but work was halted in mid-2022.

== Original design ==
The original building's design called for a height of 729 metres (2,391.7 ft) with a total of 137 floors. The tower was proposed in 2011 and construction began in 2014. The building was planned to have office space, high-end residential suites and a hotel, all served by 93 elevators.

Construction was halted in 2015 and eventually abandoned in favor of a more realistic and shorter building. The original tower would have been the second tallest building in the world if it were completed.

== Current design ==
Following a ban in China on the construction of buildings over 500 meters (1,641 feet), Suzhou Zhongnan Center was completely redesigned to comply. The new building was planned to rise 499.2 meters (1,638 feet) and was heavily inspired by traditional Suzhou patterns and architecture, most prominently in the facade of the building. The design was revealed in 2019 with construction starting in 2020. In mid-2022, when construction had reached ground level, all work was halted due to the building's owner, Zhongnan, experiencing financial difficulties. As of 2026, the tower remains incomplete and no news of it resuming construction has been announced.

== See also ==
- Gate to the East
- List of tallest buildings in China
- List of buildings with 100 floors or more
