= List of tallest buildings in Nanjing =

Tall buildings in Nanjing
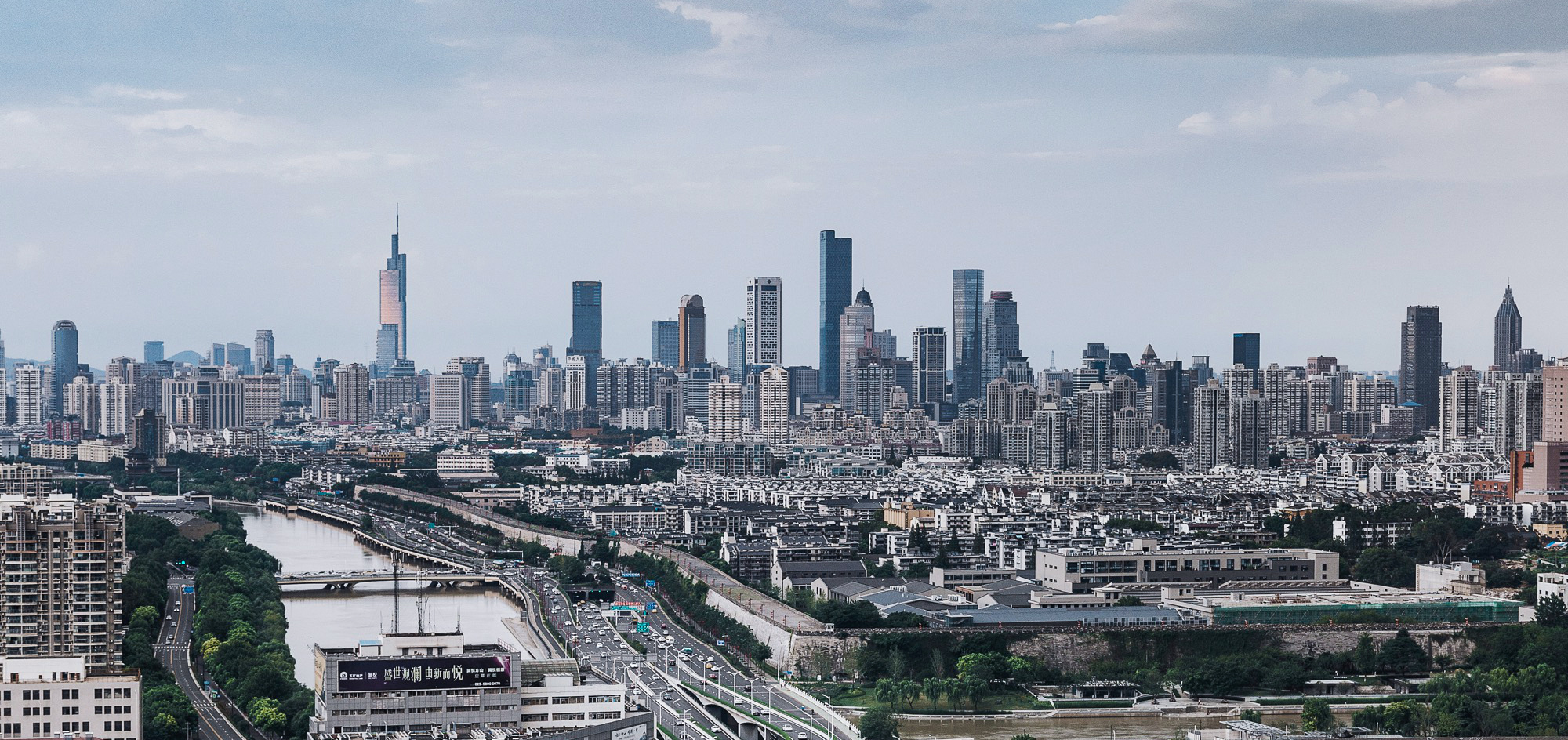
- Nanjing CBD featuring Zifeng Tower on the left and Deji Plaza on the center
- Tallest building: Zifeng Tower (2010)
- Tallest building height: 450 m (1,476 ft)
- First 150 m+ building: Golden Eagle International Plaza (1998)

Number of tall buildings
- Taller than 150 m (492 ft): 80 (2025)
- Taller than 200 m (656 ft): 38 (2025)
- Taller than 300 m (984 ft): 7 (2025) (5th)

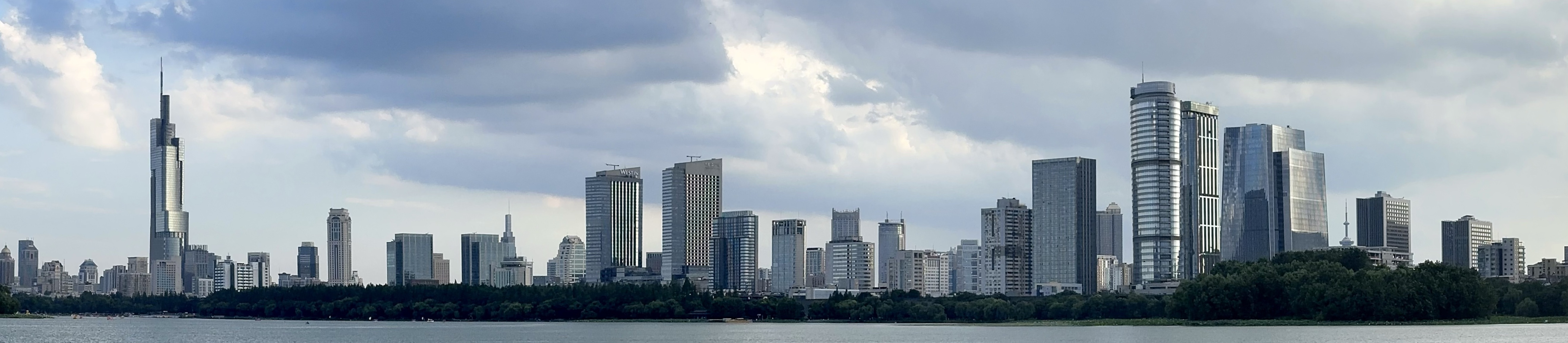
Skyline of Nanjing from Nanjing Railway Station

This list of tallest buildings in Nanjing ranks skyscrapers in Nanjing, in Jiangsu, China by height. Nanjing is the capital and largest city of Jiangsu with a total population of 7.7 million, and the second largest commercial centre in the East China region, after Shanghai. It has long been one of China's most important cities, as one of the Four Great Ancient Capitals of China. It was the capital of the Republic of China from 1928 to 1949, before the capital was moved to Beijing after the Chinese Civil War.

Tall buildings began to be constructed in Nanjing in the 90s, a decade after China's economic liberalization. Since 2010, the tallest building in Nanjing has been the Zifeng Tower, which is 450 m (1,480 ft) high and the twentieth tallest building in the world. It is a major landmark in the city. As of 2025, Nanjing is home to 80 completed buildings that stand above 150 m (492 ft) and 38 above 200 m (656 ft) Seven of these are supertall skyscrapers, which reach above 300 m (984 ft) in height; hence, Nanjing is tied with Chicago and Wuhan as the city with the fifth most supertalls in the world. A further four supertall skyscrapers are under construction as of 2025.

== Tallest buildings ==
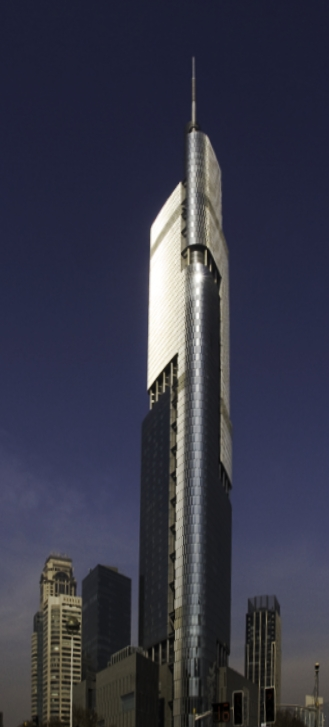
Zifeng Tower, the tallest building in Nanjing

This lists ranks Nanjing skyscrapers that stand at least 200 m (660 ft) tall, based on standard height measurement. This includes spires and architectural details but does not include antenna masts. Existing structures are included for ranking purposes based on present height.

Rank	Name	Image	Height (m)	Floors	Usage	Year	Notes
1	Zifeng Tower		450	89	Mixed-use	2010	
2	Nanjing Financial City Phase II Plot C Tower 1		416.6	88	Mixed-use	2025	
3	Golden Eagle Tiandi Tower A		368.1	77	Mixed-use	2019	
4	Golden Eagle Tiandi Tower B		328	60	Office	2019	
5	Deji World Trade Center Tower 1		326.5	68	Mixed-use	2022	
6	Deji Plaza		324	62	Mixed-use	2013	
7	Jumeirah Nanjing Hotel & International Youth Cultural Centre Tower 2		315	67	Mixed-use	2015	
8	Golden Eagle Tiandi Tower C		300	58	Office	2019	
9	Nanjing Two IFC		287.8	60	Office	2021	
10	Walsin Centro 1		274	60	Office	2022	
11	New Century Plaza Tower 1		255.2	48	Office	2006	
12	Jumeirah Nanjing Hotel & International Youth Cultural Centre Tower 1		255	61	Mixed-use	2015	
13	Xinjiekou Department Store Phase 2		249	60	Office	2009	
14	Asia Pacific Tower & Jinling Hotel		242	57	Mixed-use	2014	
15	Jinling Central Tower 1		235	44	Office	2024	
16	China Merchants Financial Center		232	51	Office	2007	
17	Xindi Center		232	53	Office	2009	
18	Kingtown International Center		231.2	56	Mixed-use	2014	
19	China Merchants Bank Tower		230	48	Office	2017	
20	Golden Eagle International Shopping Center		220	44	Mixed-use	2016	
21	Shangmao Century Plaza		218	56	Office	2002	
22	Nanjing Financial City Phase II Tower 3		216.9	-	Office	2020	
23	Fengda International Hotel		216	52	Hotel	2024	
24	Golden Eagle International Plaza		214	58	Mixed-use	1998	
25	Suning Ruicheng Phase 1 E08 #2		210	34	Office	2015	
26	Suning Ruicheng Phase 1 E06 #1		210	46	Office	2015	
27	Suning Ruicheng Phase 1 E07 #2		210	46	Office	2015	
28	Zhongshang Wanhao International Condominium		210	54	Residential	2009	
29	Jiangsu TV Station Building		209	37	Office	2007	
30	Nanjing Financial City Tower 2		205.5	45	Office	2016	
31	Zhonghuan International Plaza		203	50	Mixed-use	2008	
32	MIXC Nanjing Runjiang Building		201.9	45	Mixed-use	2023	
33	Nanjing MIXC Tower 1		201.9	45	Office	2023	
34	Nanjing Jiangbei Wondercity Tower 1		201.5	40	Mixed-use	2023	
35	Suning Electric Plaza		200	34	Office	2016	
36	Nanjing Financial City Tower 6		200	46	Office	2016	
37	Nanjing Vertical Forest Tower 1		200	-	Mixed-use	2023	
38	Nanjing Financial City Tower 4		200	46	Office	2017	
39	Jiangsu Telecommunication Limited Company Multiple-Use Building		200	48	Office	2008	

== Tallest under construction or proposed ==
=== Under construction ===
This list buildings that are under construction in Nanjing and that are planned to rise at least 200 m (660 ft). Buildings that have already been topped out are included.

Name	Height* m / feet	Floors*	Year*	Notes
Greenland Jinmao IFC	499.8 / 1640	102	2028	
Hexi Yuzui Tower A	499 / 1636	110	2028	
Jiangbei New Financial Center Phase I	320 / 1050	63	2027	
Shimao SIC 2	250 / 820	65	2025	
