= Nanjing Financial City II =

Skyscraper in Nanjing, China

- 南京金融城
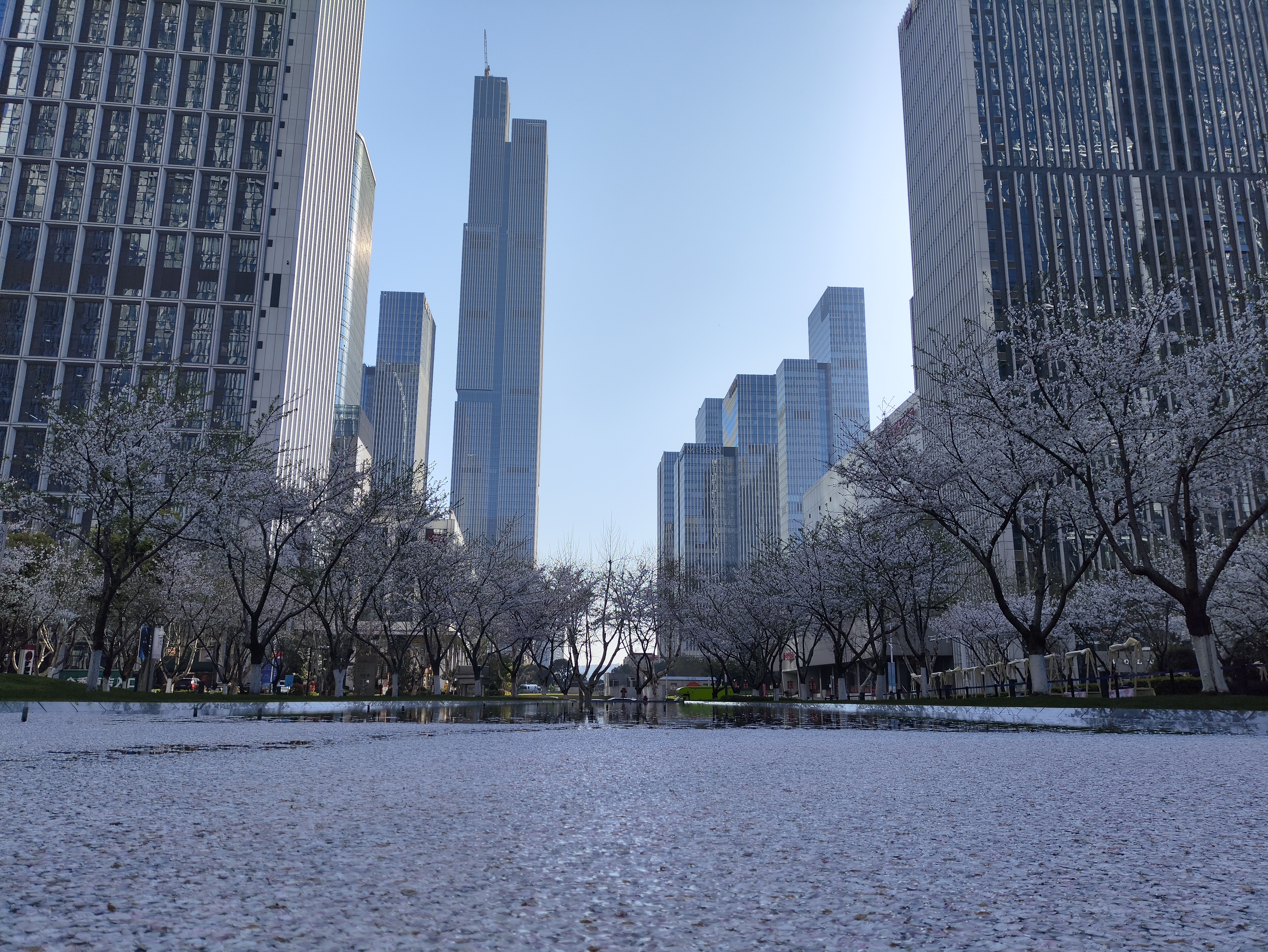
- Interactive map of the Nanjing Financial City II area

General information
- Status: Completed
- Type: Mixed-use: Office / Hotel
- Location: Nanjing, China, XPM7+FQJ, Jianye District
- Coordinates: 31.98554°N 118.70955°E
- Construction started: 2019
- Completed: 2025

Height
- Roof: 416.6 m (1,367 ft) (Tower 1)

Technical details
- Structural system: Concrete-steel composite
- Floor count: 88 (+5 underground) (Tower 1)
- Floor area: 798,000 m^{2} (8,590,000 sq ft) (entire complex)

Design and construction
- Architects: Gerkan, Marg and Partners; East China Architectural Design & Research Institute
- Structural engineer: Arup Group

The Nanjing Financial City II (Chinese: 南京金融城) is a mixed-use skyscraper complex in the Jianye District of Nanjing, China. Built between 2019 and 2025, the complex consists of five towers, with the tallest standing at 416.6 m (1,367 ft) tall with 88 floors (Tower 1). The latter is the current second tallest building in Nanjing.

== Architecture ==
The complex is located in Jianye District, Nanjing City, Jiangsu Province, China. It is a large-scale urban development project with a construction progress of two phases. The second phase of the Financial City was designed by GMP Architects and consists of five towers with a total area of 798,000 square meters. The height of the main building C1 is 416.6 meters. It was topped out in January 2024 and became the second tallest skyscraper in Nanjing, second only to the Zifeng Tower.

The German architecture firm Gerkan, Marg and Partners designed the Plot C of the site to feature two prominent towers. First, a 186-meter building mainly for serviced apartments, and the second one, a supertall skyscraper standing at 416.6 meters tall, serving as an urban landmark visible from great distances and accommodating diverse mixed uses. The highest tower, encompassing a total of 171,500 m^{2} (1,850,000 sq ft) square meters, is divided into five office units, each consisting of nine stories. Above this section, from levels 61 to 80, 51,000 m^{2} (549,000 sq ft) are allocated for a five-star hotel featuring 250 rooms, among various other functions.

=== Buildings ===
Name	Image	Height m (ft)	Floors	Function	Notes
Tower 1 (Phase II Plot C Tower 1)		416.6 m (1,367 ft)	88	Office/Hotel	
Tower 3		217 m (712 ft)	N/A	Office	
Tower 2		196 m (643 ft)	N/A	Office	
Tower 5		173 m (568 ft)	N/A	Office	
Tower 4		158 m (518 ft)	N/A	Office	

== See also ==
- List of tallest buildings in China
- List of tallest buildings in Nanjing
