= Deji Plaza =

Supertall skyscraper in Nanjing, Jiangsu, China

Coordinates: 32.0451°N 118.7858°E

Deji Plaza Phase 1
- 德基广场一期
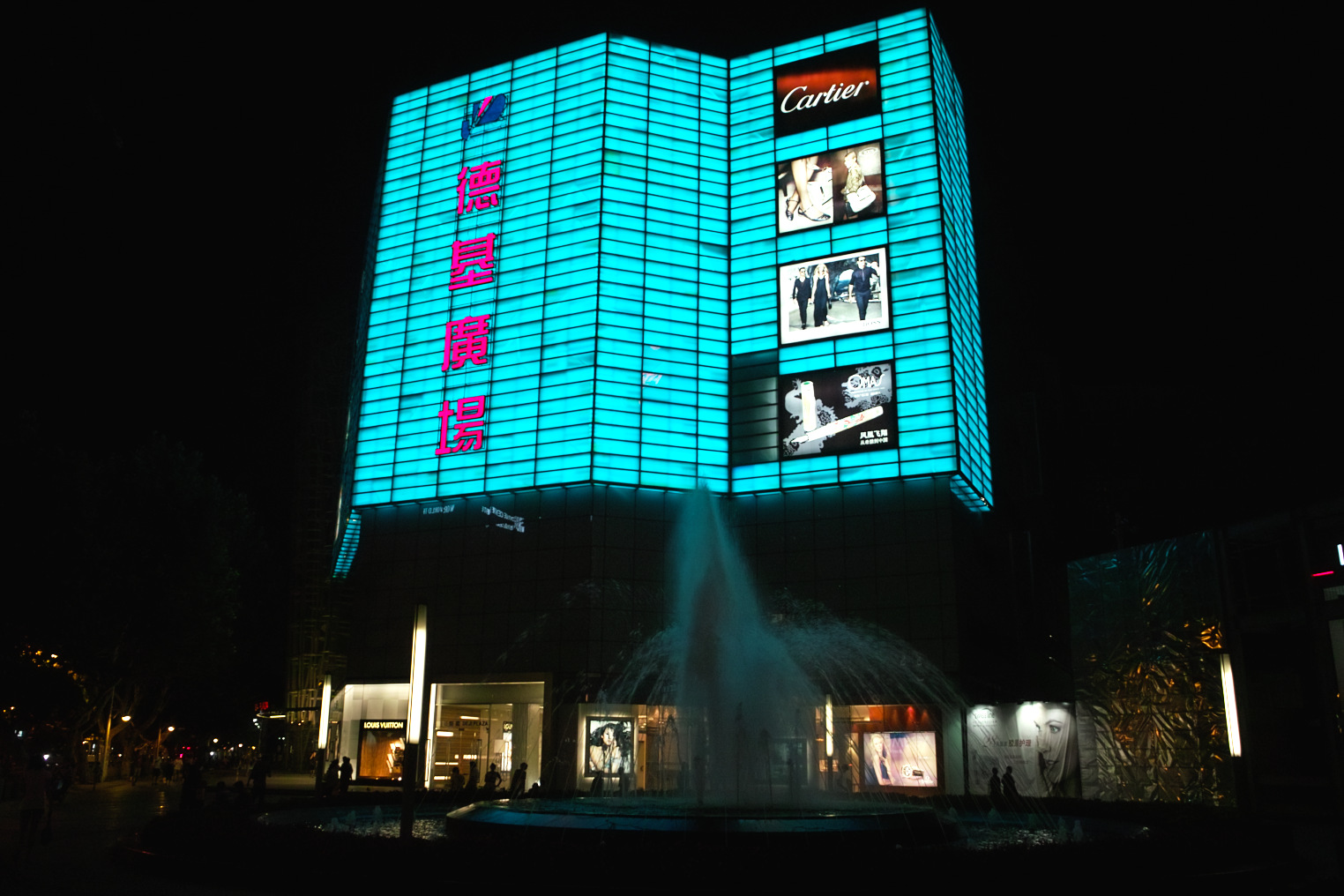
- Deji Plaza Phase 1 at night
- Interactive map of the Deji Plaza Phase 1 area

General information
- Status: Completed
- Type: Shopping Mall
- Location: Xinjiekou, Nanjing, Jiangsu, China
- Opened: June 26th, 2006

Technical details
- Floor count: 7 (plus one basement floor)
- Floor area: 65000m^{2}

Design and construction
- Architecture firm: LMCA Design

Deji Plaza Phase 2
- 德基广场二期
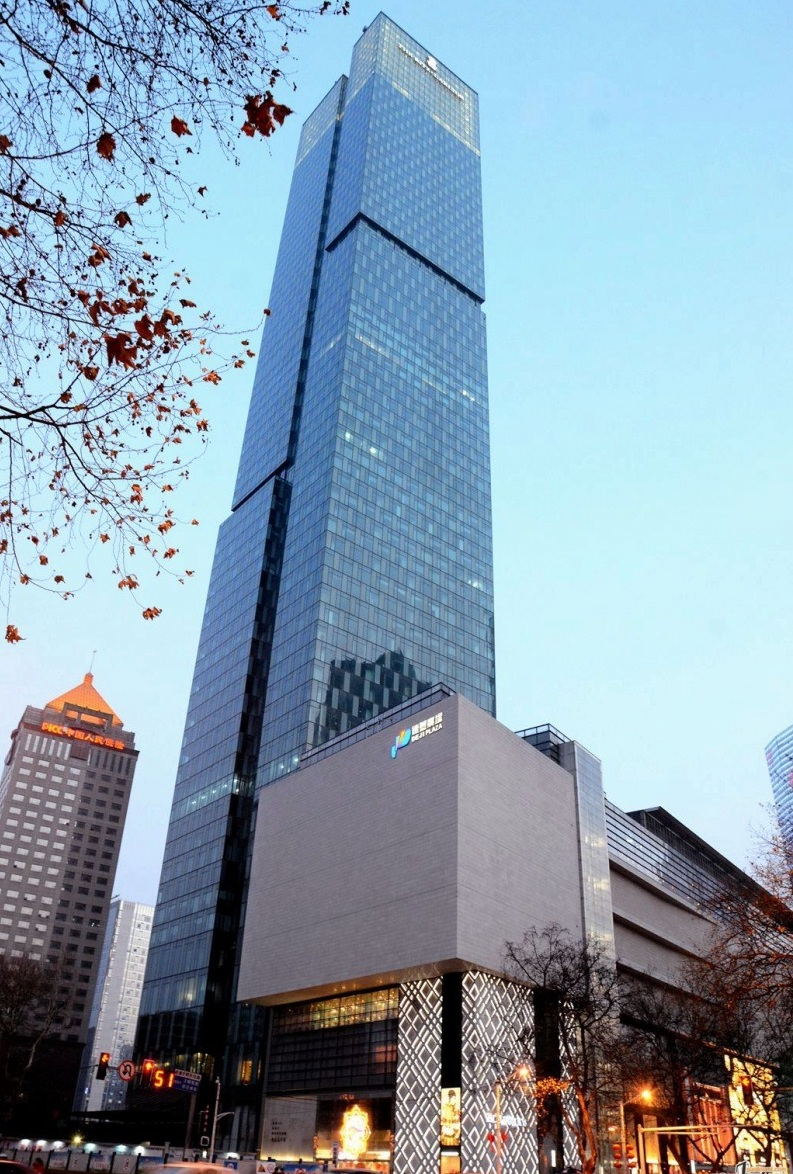
- Deji Plaza
- Interactive map of the Deji Plaza Phase 2 area

General information
- Status: Completed
- Type: Skyscraper
- Location: 18 Zhongshan Road, Xuanwu District, Xinjiekou, Nanjing, Jiangsu, China
- Groundbreaking: July 20, 2006
- Construction started: July 30, 2009
- Opened: November 6, 2013

Height
- Height: 324 m (1,063 ft)

Technical details
- Floor count: 70 (skyscraper) 8 (shopping mall)
- Floor area: 135,710 sq m

Design and construction
- Architecture firm: LMCA Design

Deji Plaza (simplified Chinese: 德基广场; traditional Chinese: 德基廣場; pinyin: Déjī Guǎngchǎng) is an upscale office and shopping mall complex in Xinjiekou, Nanjing, Jiangsu Province.

The shopping mall is one of the largest in Nanjing and features flagship stores of numerous luxurious brands, including Gucci, Yves Saint Laurent, Louis Vuitton, Bvlgari, Cartier, Dior, Hermes, Chanel, prada, Tiffany & Co., among others. It also include an Ice Rink and an IMAX theatre.

== See also ==
- Deji Art Museum
- List of tallest buildings in Nanjing
