= Deji Art Museum =

- 德基艺术博物馆
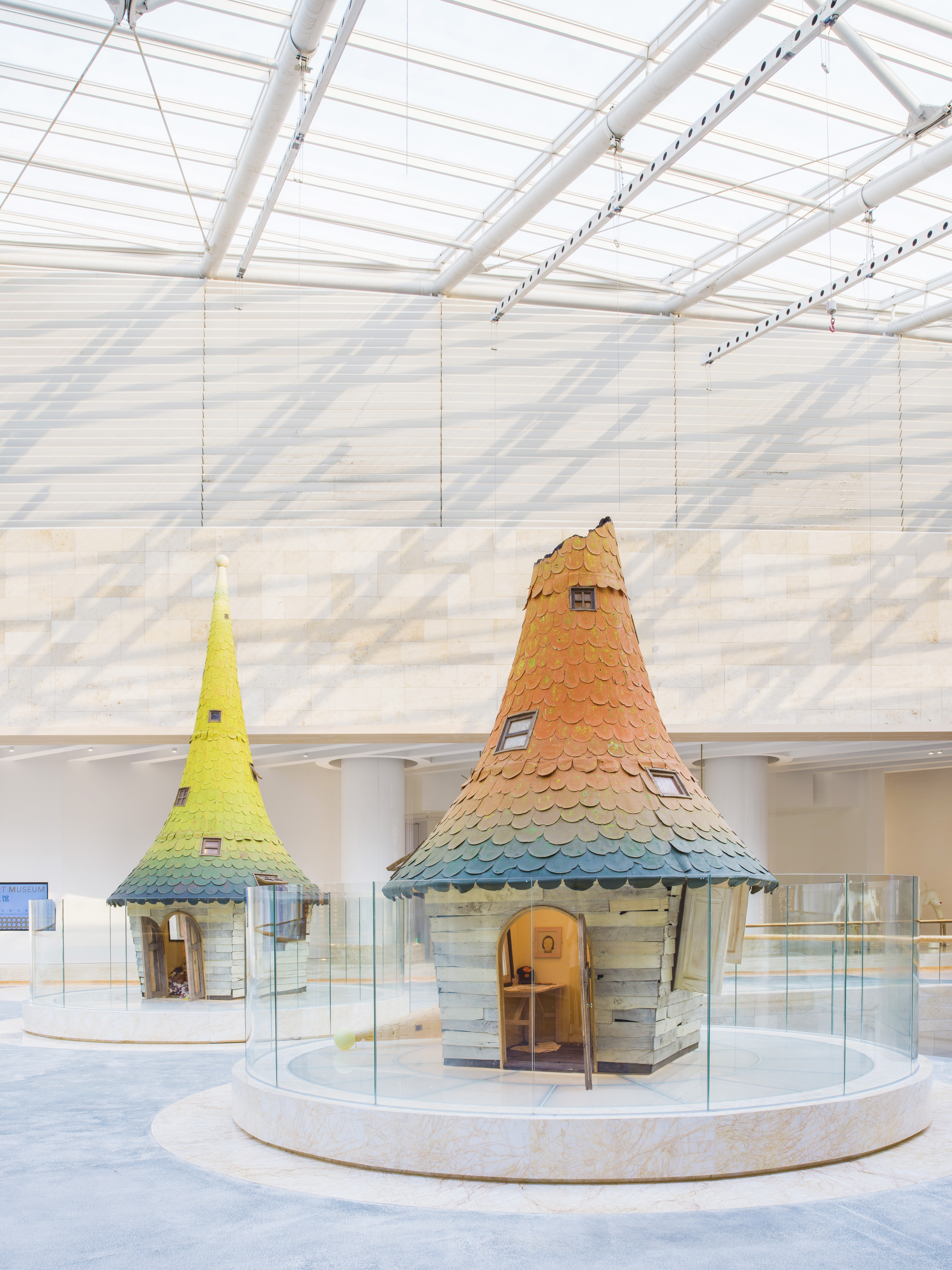
- Interior of the museum
- Established: 26 September 2017
- Location: Deji Plaza, Xuanwu, Nanjing, Jiangsu Province, China
- Coordinates: 32.0453°N 118.7799°E
- Type: Art museum
- Founder: Deji Group
- Director: Ai Lin

Deji Art Museum (Chinese: 德基艺术博物馆) is a museum founded in 2017, located in Nanjing, Jiangsu Province, China.

The museum covers an area of about 9,000 square metres. Its collections span multiple categories, including ancient Chinese ceramics, calligraphy and painting, Buddhist sculptures, Ming-style furniture, modern and contemporary art. The museum is notable for remaining open until midnight.

== History ==
On 26 September 2017, Deji Art Museum opened to the public, with its inaugural exhibition "Elegance Of The Exhibition Guan Jun’s Calligraphy And Paintings". On 29 October 2021, the museum reopened after renovation. In 2023, it obtained museum qualification approval from the National Cultural Heritage Administration and was formally recognized "德基艺术博物馆". In 2024, the museum was included in the “Top 100 Popular Museums of the Year” list. In addition to its current site, a branch in the Xianlin district of Nanjing is under construction.

== Collections and exhibitions ==
=== Permanent exhibitions ===
==== "An Era in Jinling: A Digital Art Exhibition" ====
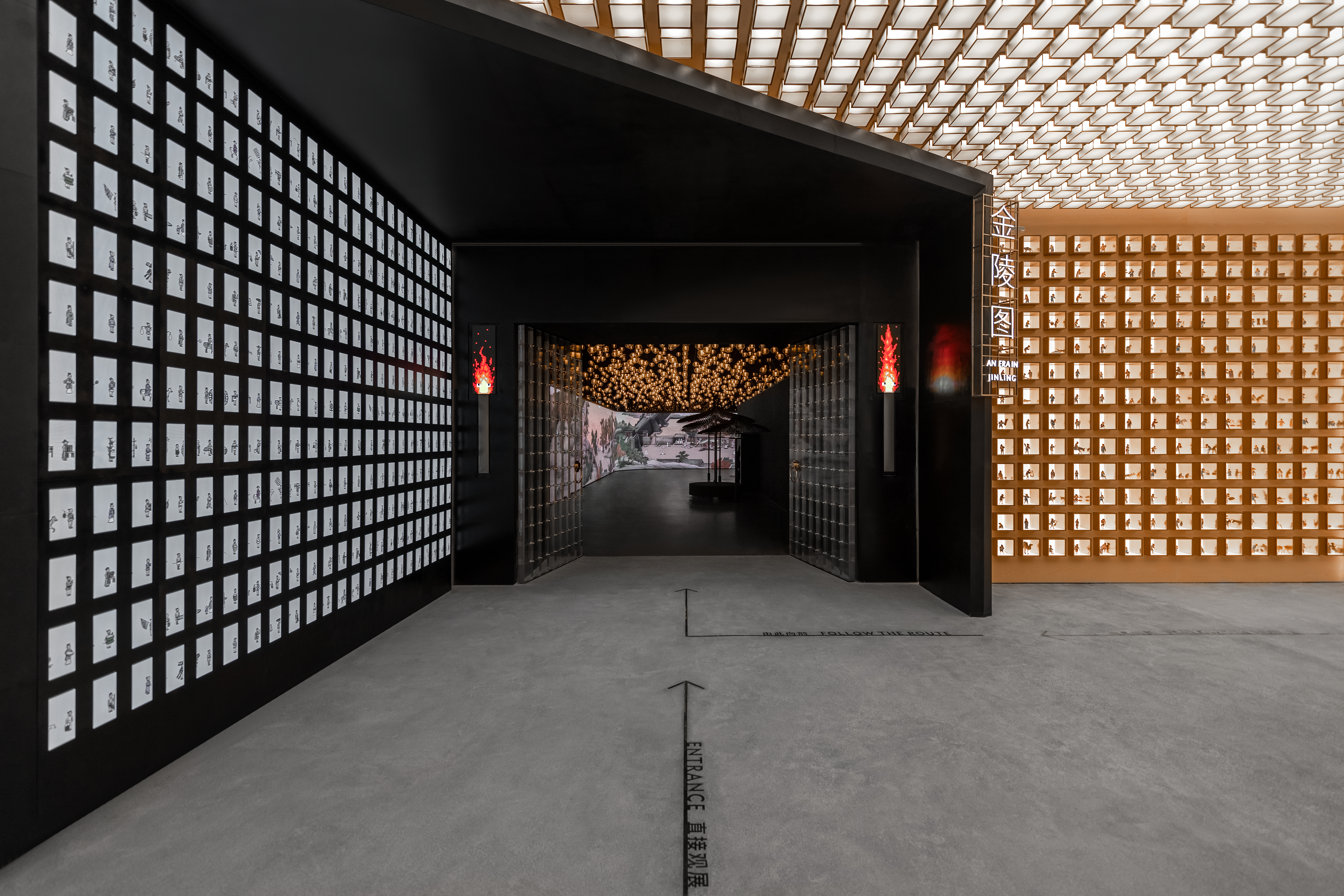

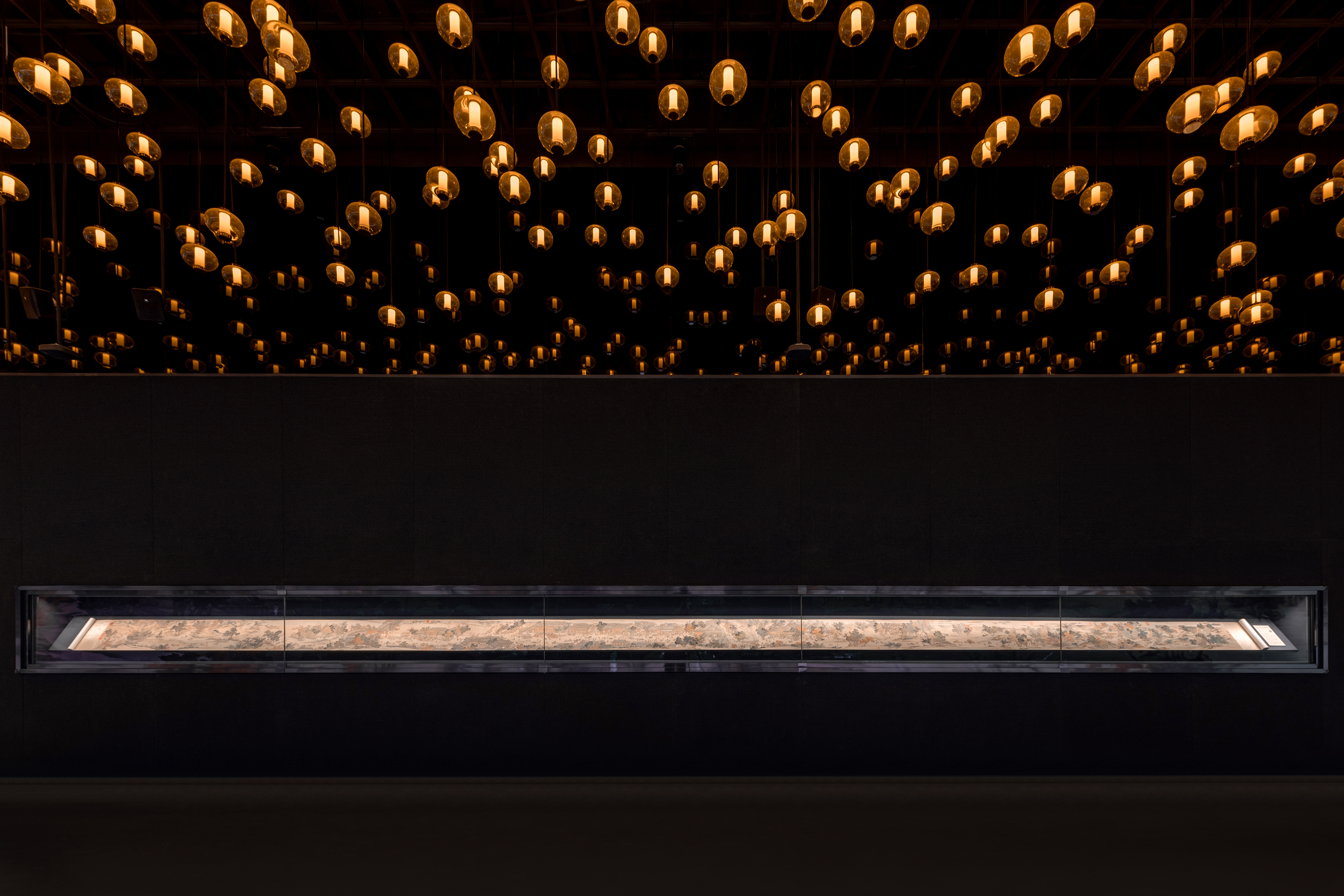

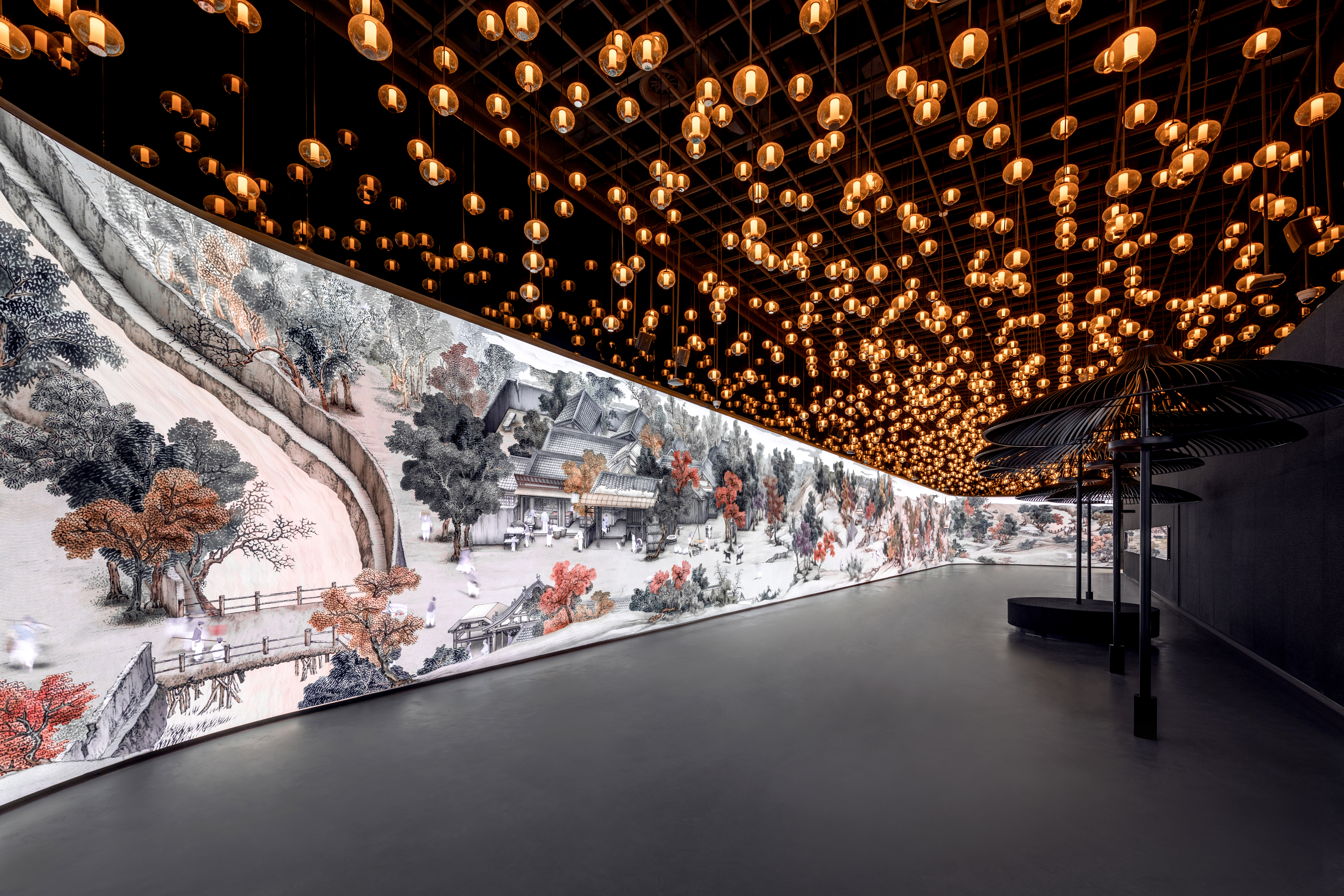

Based on the museum's collection, Feng Ning's Imitation of the Song Academy Version of "Prosperous Jinling", and using ultra-wideband technology, the exhibition adopts an interactive viewing mode in which "people enter the painting and are tracked in real time", allowing visitors to experience the scenery of Song-dynasty Jinling City from a first-person perspective. The exhibition has toured to Paris, Boston and other places, and in November 2025 it was presented as a case study at the United Nations Educational, Scientific and Cultural Organization General Conference.

==== "Nothing Still About Still Lifes ====
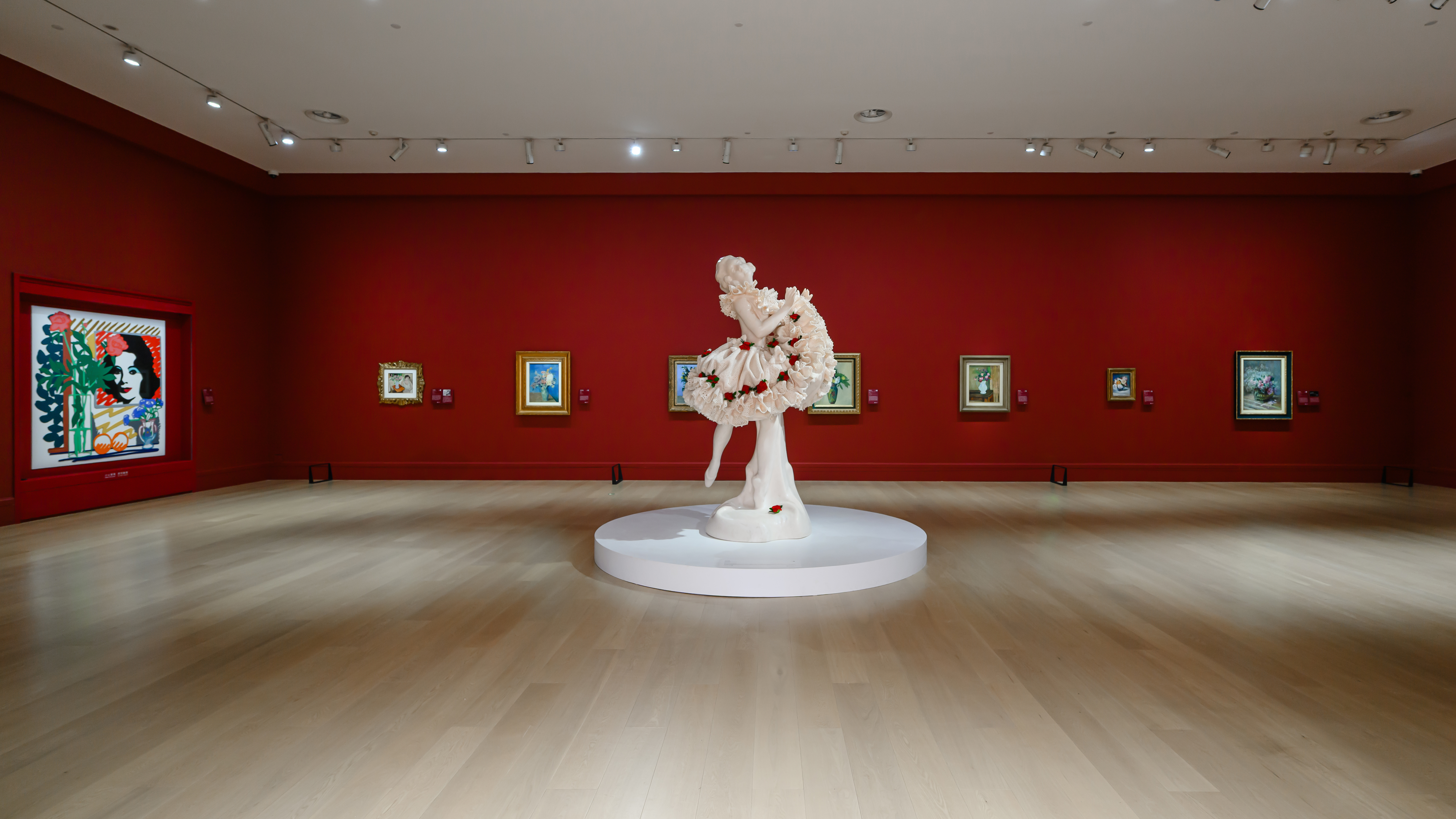

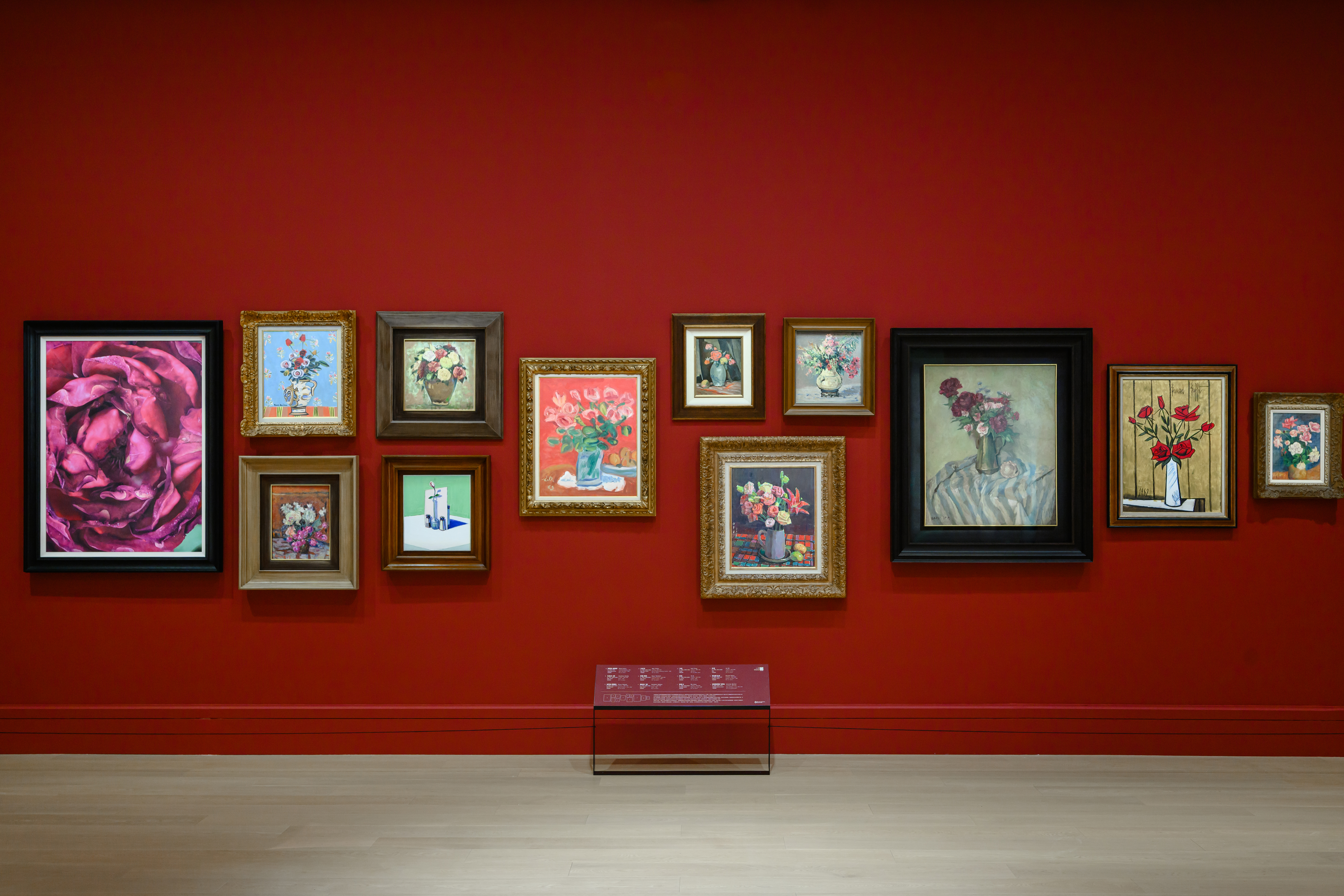

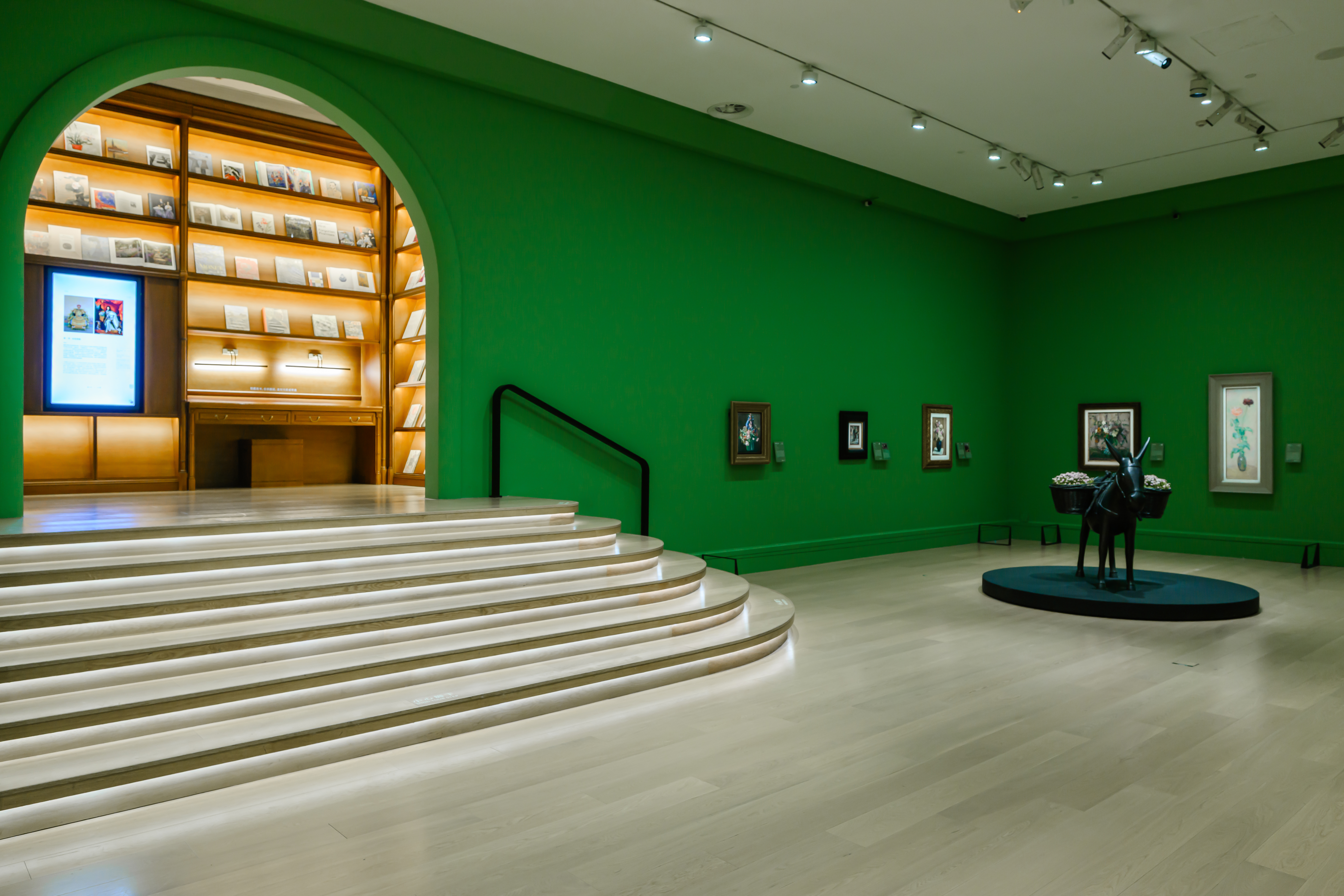

Masterpieces from the World of Flowers Collection": This exhibition presents approximately 141 floral-themed works by 109 Chinese and foreign artists including Claude Monet, Pablo Picasso, Zao Wou-Ki, and Yayoi Kusama, showcasing the development of flower still-life painting from the 18th century to the present.

==== "Beeple: Tales from a synthetic future" ====
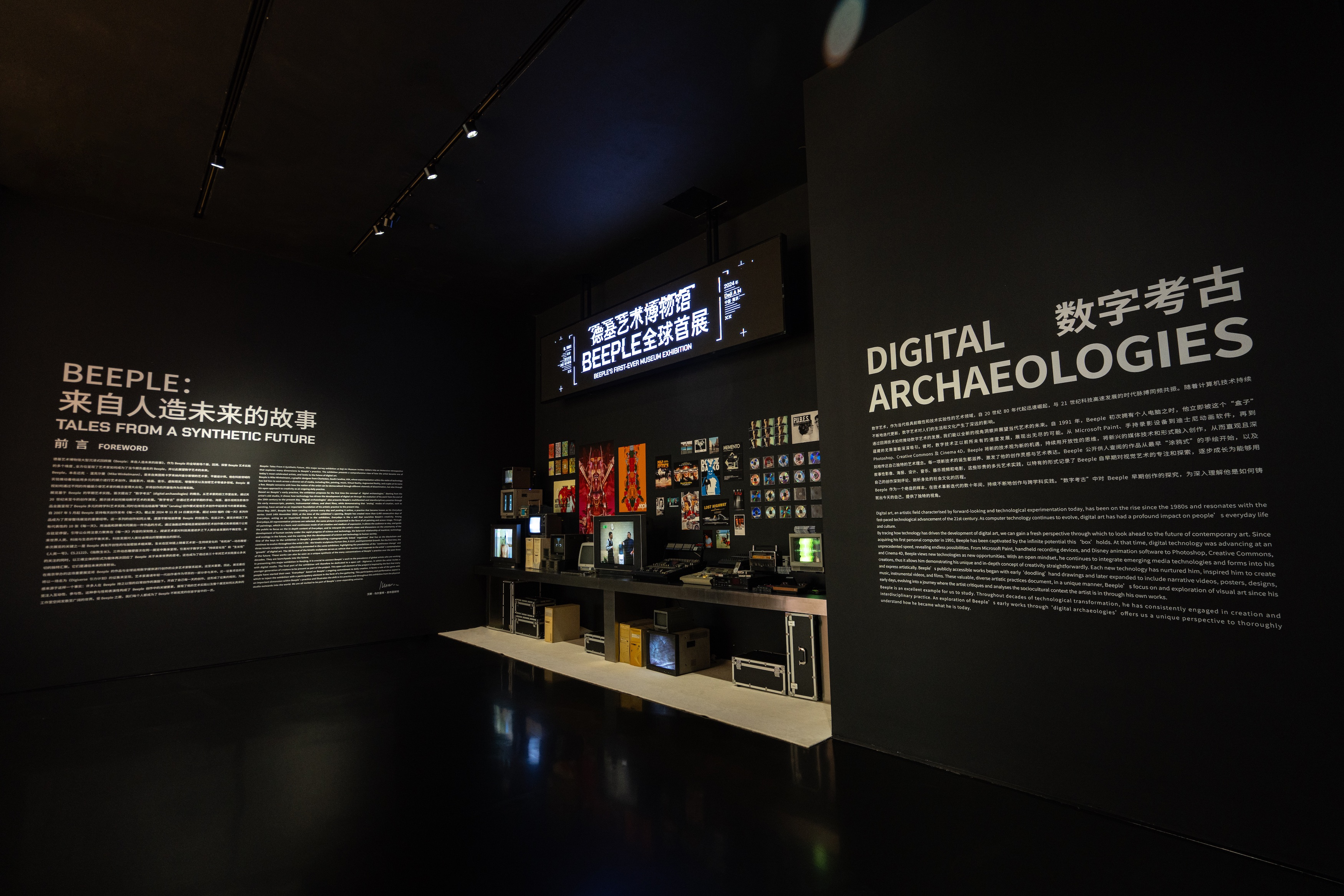

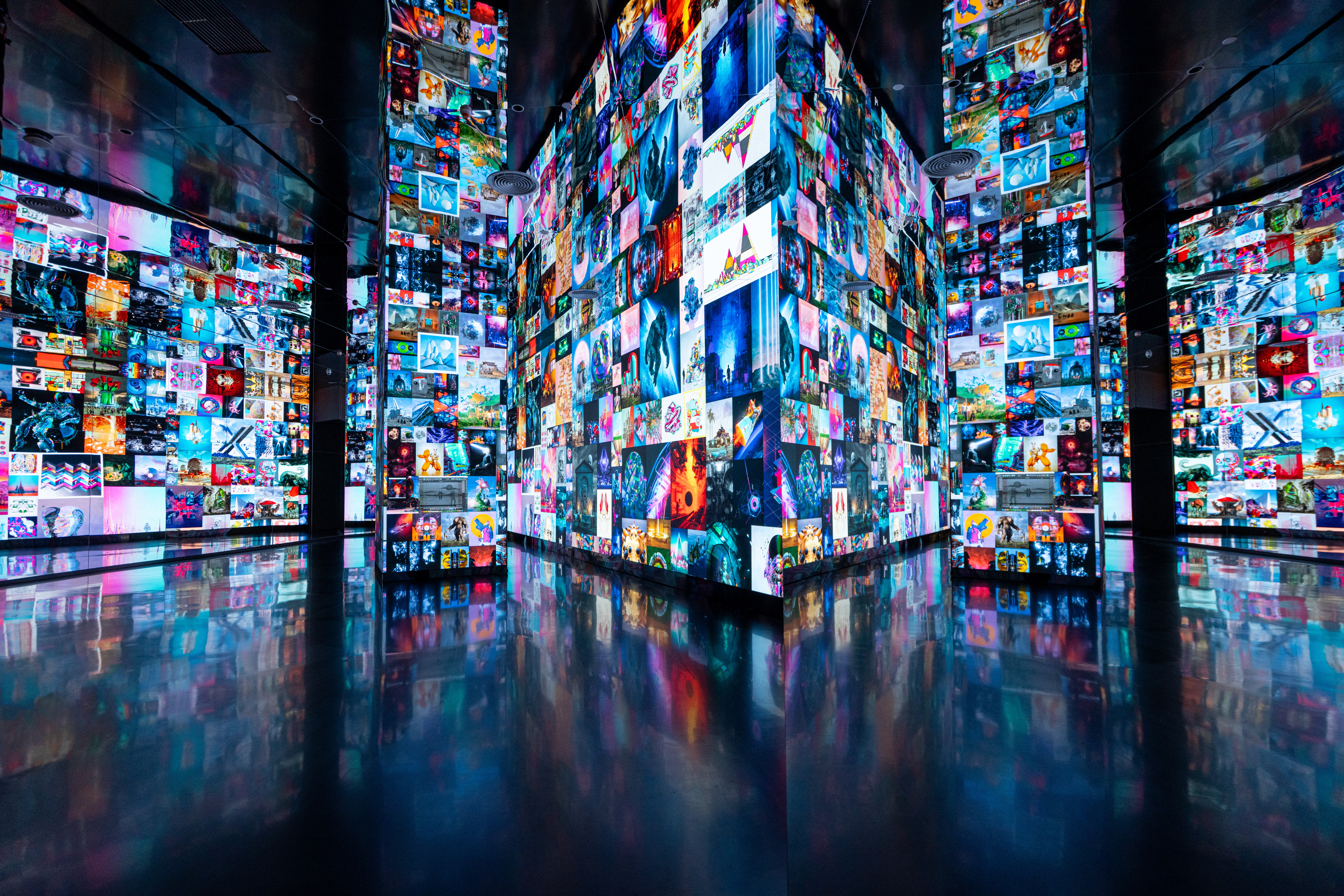

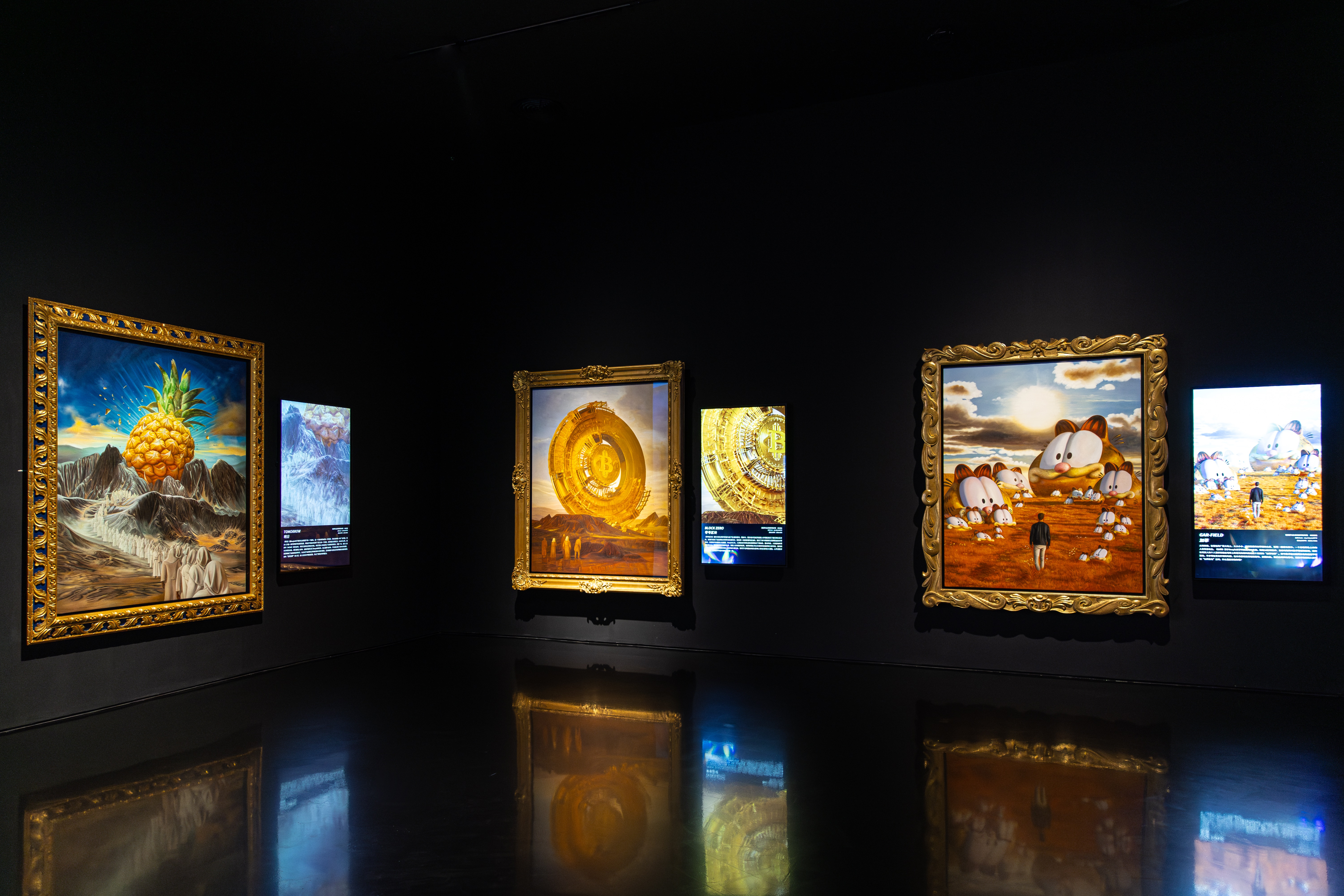

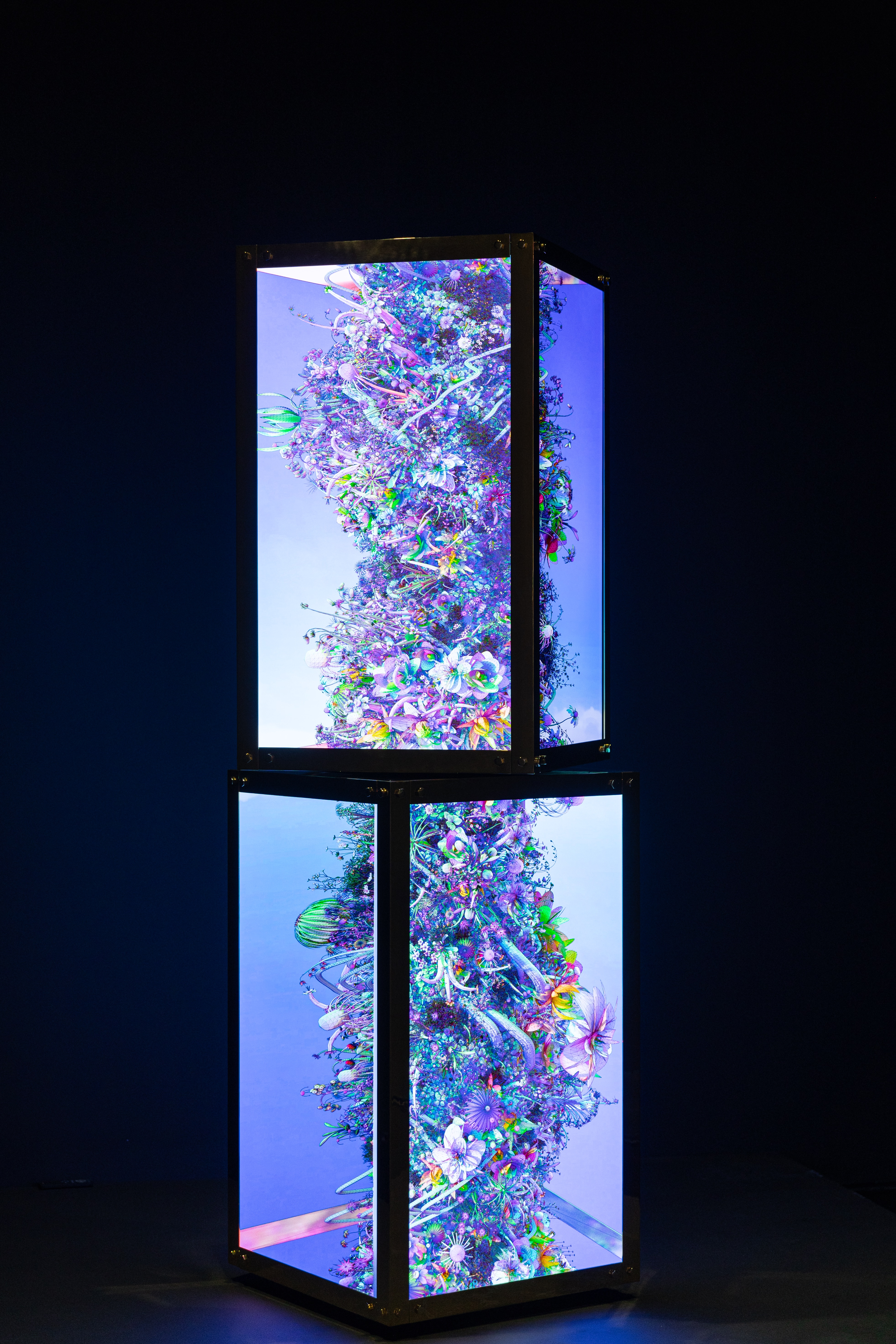

The exhibition covers important works from the career of American digital artist Beeple (Mike Winkelmann), including the Everydays series, S.2122, as well as pieces he created specially for this exhibition.

=== Public art projects ===
==== "The Transformative Power of Memories" ====
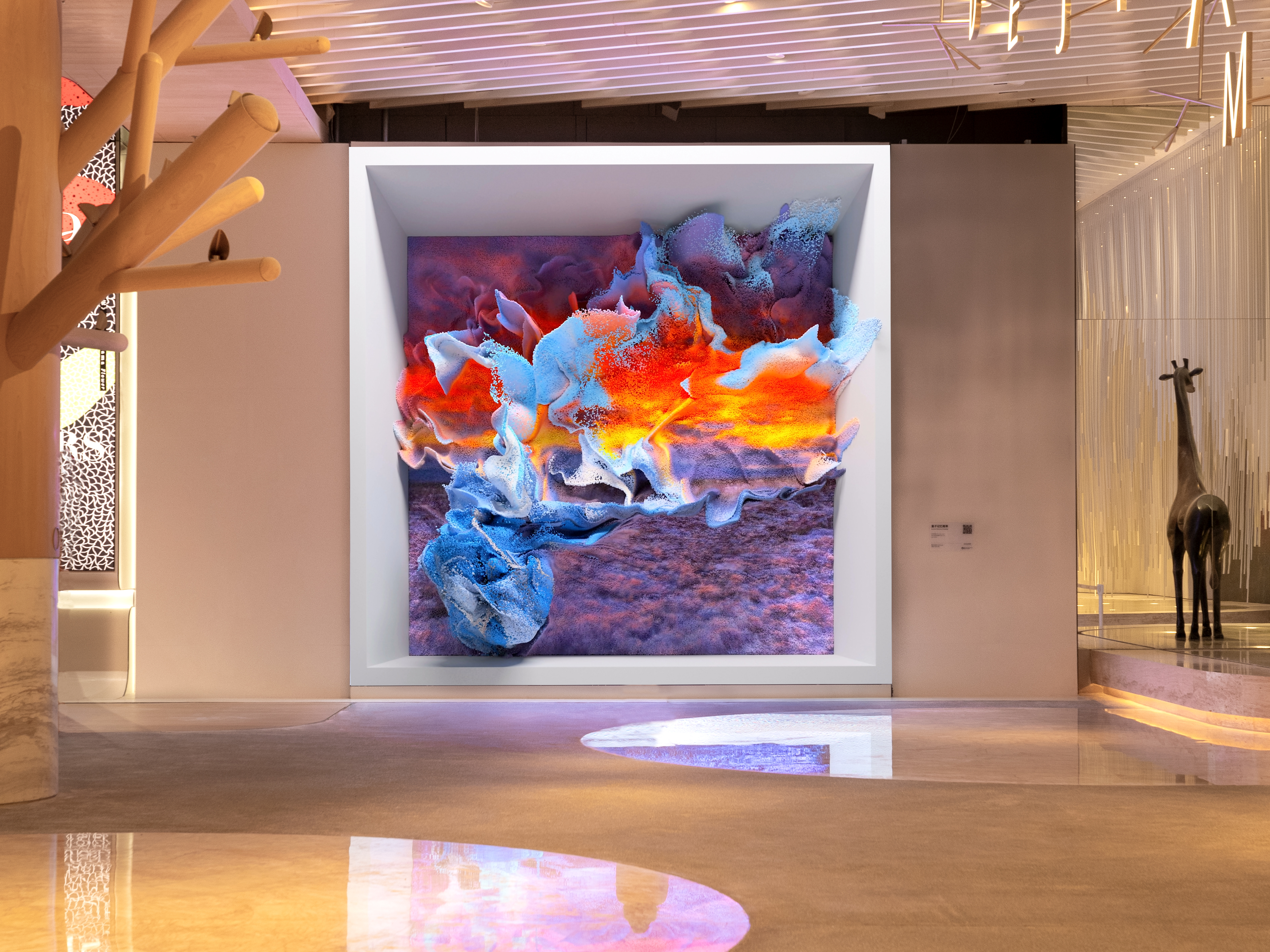

Refik Anadol’s Melting Memories – Engram – Box and Quantum Memories Probability are displayed on the giant outdoor LED screen of Phase I of Deji Plaza and in the public art area on the 8th floor of Phase II of Deji Plaza.

==== “Yoshitomo Nara: Not Everything But / Green House, Not Everything But / Orange House” ====
Yoshitomo Nara’s installation.

=== Temporary exhibitions ===
The museum has also held many important temporary exhibitions, such as "Masterpieces of the Eight Eccentrics of Yangzhou, Yudetang Collection" (2018), the immersive digital exhibition "The Worlds of Splendors: Global Premiere Immersive Digital Art Exhibition" (2019), "The Physics of Chen Qi：Experimenting With Curation and Comprehension" (2019), solo exhibition "Stay Where You Are" by Gao Yun (2019), "Exquisite 50 – Song Imperial Porcelain" (2021), and the Van Cleef & Arpels high jewellery art exhibition (2025).
