= Golden Eagle Tiandi Tower A =

Supertall skyscraper in Nanjing, Jiangsu, China

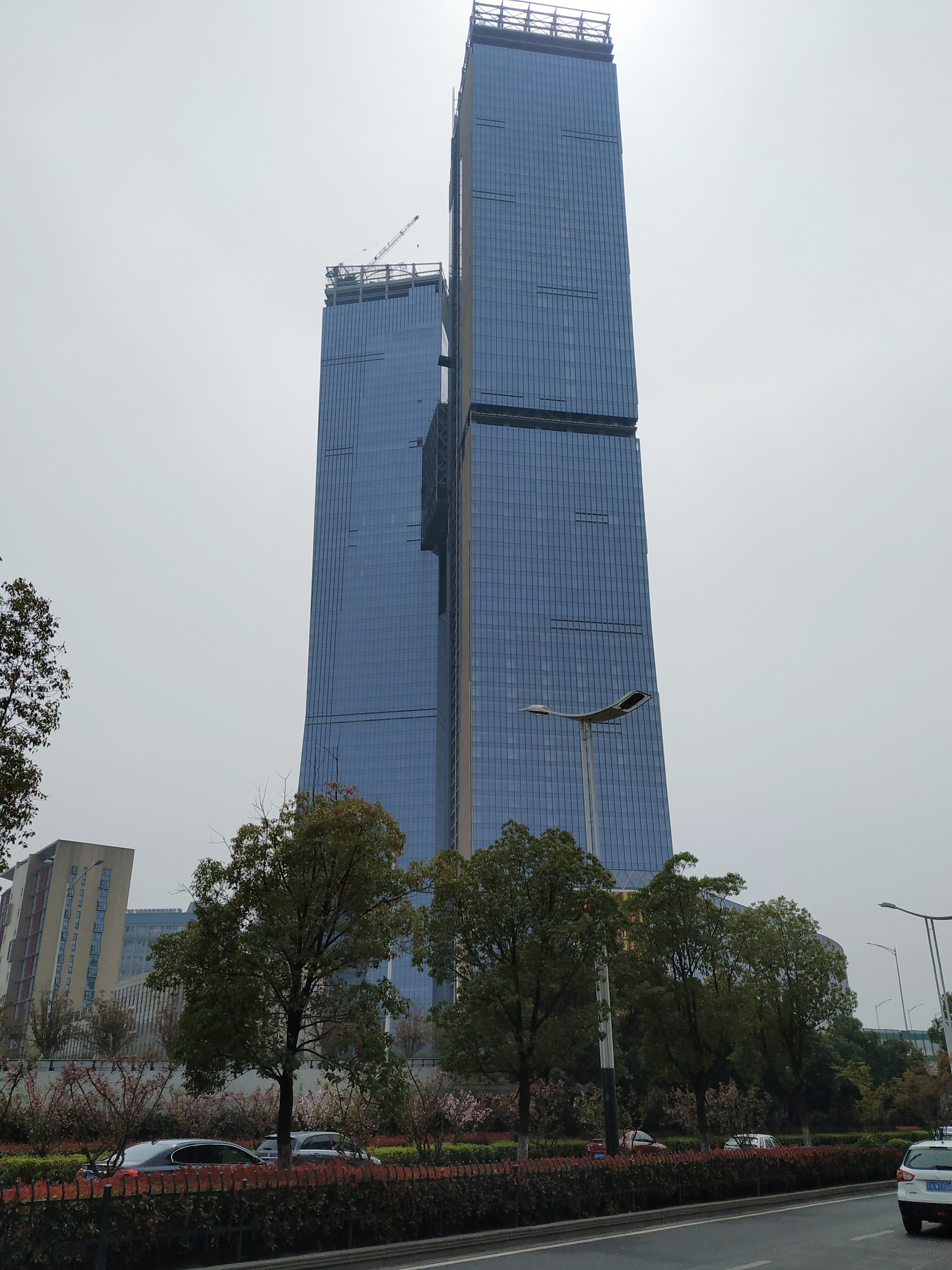
- Top-out in March 2019
- Interactive map of the Golden Eagle Tiandi Tower A area

General information
- Status: Completed
- Location: Nanjing, Jiangsu, China
- Coordinates: 32.0260°N 118.7348°E
- Construction started: 2013
- Completed: 2019

Height
- Architectural: 368 m (1,207 ft)
- Tip: 368 m (1,207 ft)

Technical details
- Floor count: 76

Golden Eagle Tiandi Tower A is a supertall skyscraper located in Nanjing, Jiangsu, China. It has a height of 368 meters (1,207 ft). Construction began in 2013 and was completed in 2019. It is a high-end shopping mall and hotel.

== See also ==
- Golden Eagle Tiandi Tower B
- List of tallest buildings in China
