= Zifeng Tower =

Supertall skyscraper in Nanjing, Jiangsu, China

Coordinates: 32°03′45″N 118°46′41″E

- 紫峰大厦

General information
- Status: Completed
- Type: Mixed use
- Location: 1 Zhongyang Road; Gulou District, Nanjing, Jiangsu
- Groundbreaking: 29 May 2004
- Construction started: 27 February 2005
- Completed: 30 January 2010 – 8 April 2010
- Opening: 18 December 2010
- Cost: 5 billion RMB

Height
- Architectural: 453 m (1,486 ft)
- Roof: 450.3 m (1,477 ft)
- Top floor: 316.5 m (1,038 ft)
- Observatory: 381 m (1,250 ft)

Technical details
- Floor count: 89
- Floor area: 1,480,350 ft^{2} (137,529 m^{2})
- Lifts/elevators: 52

Design and construction
- Architect: Adrian Smith at SOM
- Structural engineer: Skidmore, Owings and Merrill
- Main contractor: Shanghai Construction Group

Other information
- Parking: 1200

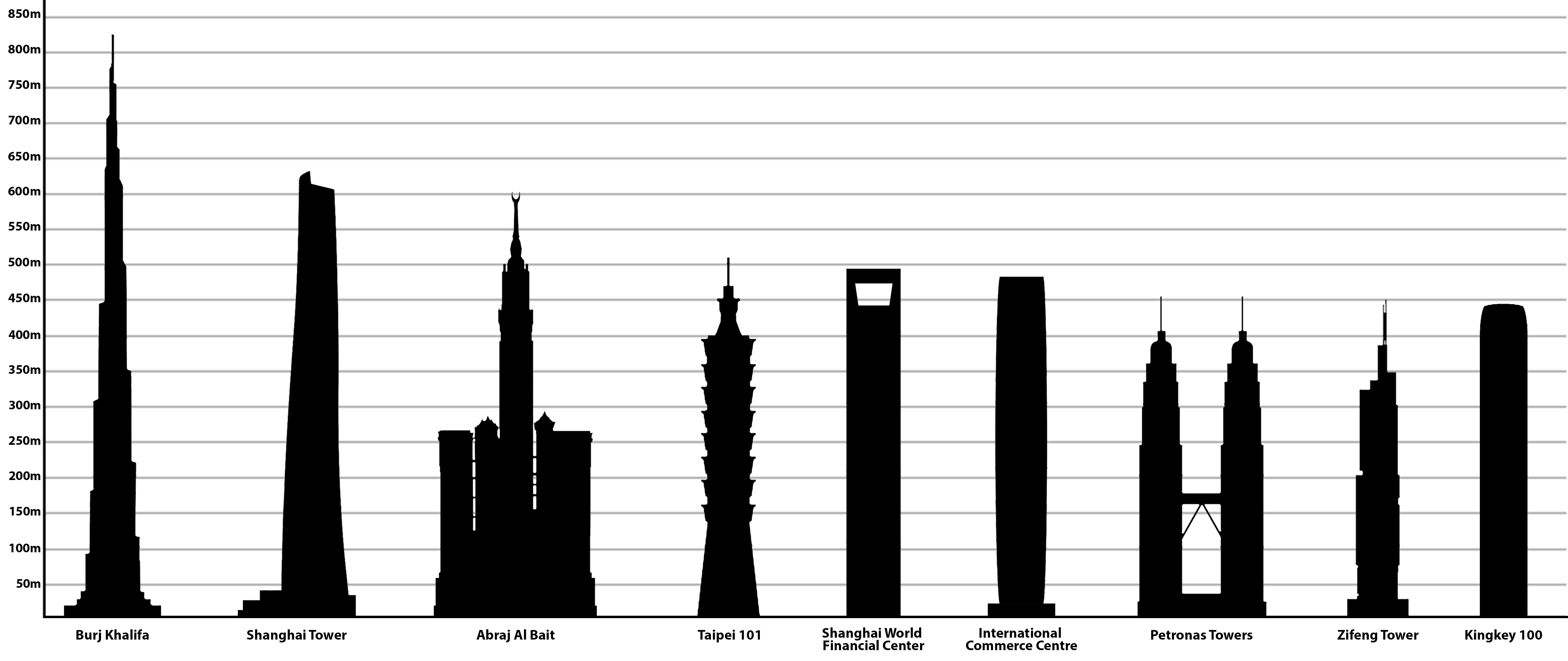
Zifeng Tower compared with other tallest buildings in Asia.

Zifeng Tower
- Simplified Chinese: 紫峰大厦
- Traditional Chinese: 紫峰大廈
- Literal meaning: Purple Peak High-rise
Transcriptions
Standard Mandarin
- Hanyu Pinyin: Zǐfēng Dàshà

Greenland Center/Square-Zifeng Tower
- Simplified Chinese: 绿地中心/广场·紫峰大厦
- Traditional Chinese: 綠地中心/廣場·紫峰大廈
Transcriptions
Standard Mandarin
- Hanyu Pinyin: Lǜdì Zhōngxīn/Guǎngchǎng-Zǐfēng Dàshà

Nanjing Greenland Financial Center
- Simplified Chinese: 南京绿地金融中心
- Traditional Chinese: 南京綠地金融中心
Transcriptions
Standard Mandarin
- Hanyu Pinyin: Nánjīng Lǜdì Jīnróng Zhōngxīn

Zifeng Tower (Greenland Center-Zifeng Tower or Greenland Square Zifeng Tower, formerly Nanjing Greenland Financial Center) is a 450-meter (1,480 ft) supertall skyscraper (special class of skyscraper) in Nanjing, Jiangsu. The 89-story building completed in 2010 comprises retail and office. Floors 49/71 feature a hotel, numerous restaurants, and a public observatory.

The tower's interior is functional; office, hotel, and retail are located above, while the restaurants and the public observatory are housed at the top of the tower. The building is currently the tallest in Nanjing and Jiangsu province, the eleventh tallest in China and the twenty-second tallest in the world.

Architectural firm Skidmore, Owings and Merrill designed the building, led by Adrian Smith. The Tower occupies an area of 18,721 square meters. The Nanjing Greenland InterContinental Hotel is located within the tower.

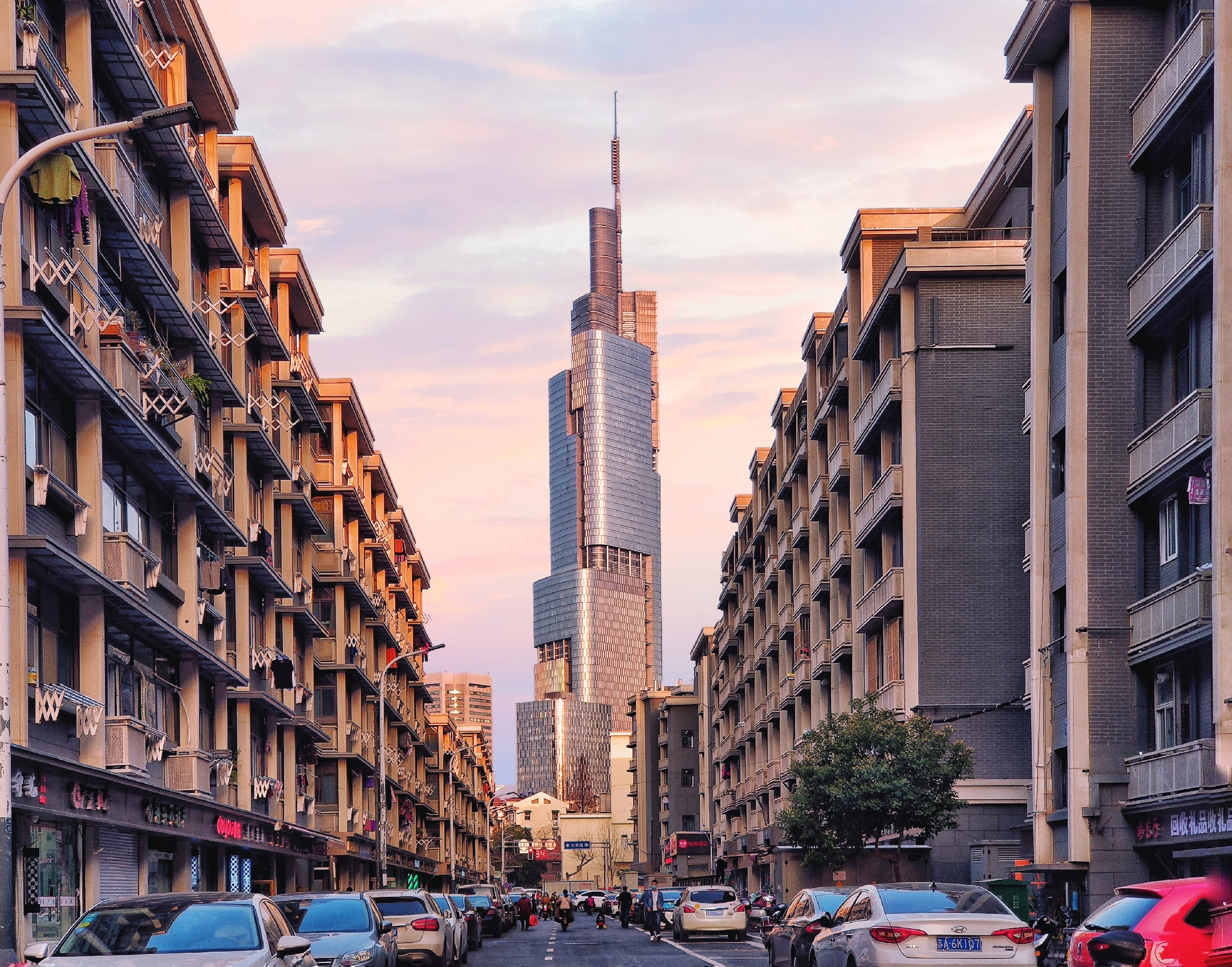
Zifeng Tower during sunset

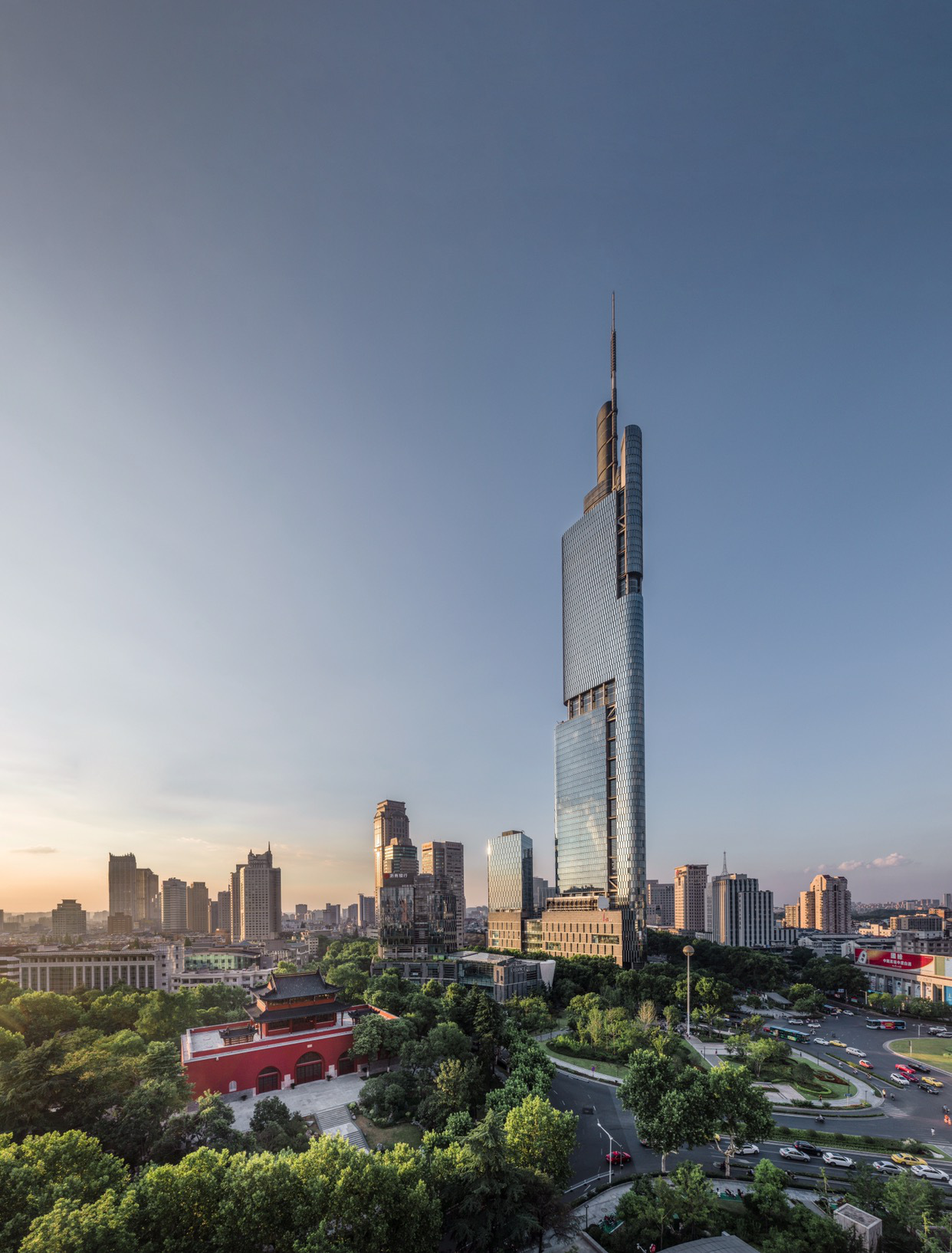
Zifeng Tower during sunset
