= Golden Eagle Tiandi Tower B =

Supertall skyscraper in Nanjing, Jiangsu, China

General information
- Status: Completed
- Location: Nanjing, Jiangsu, China
- Construction started: 2013
- Completed: 2019

Height
- Architectural: 328 m (1,076 ft)
- Tip: 328 m (1,076 ft)

Technical details
- Floor count: 68

Golden Eagle Tiandi Tower B is a supertall skyscraper located in Nanjing, Jiangsu, China. It has a height of 328 meters (1,076 ft). Construction began in 2013 and ended in 2019.

== See also ==
- Golden Eagle Tiandi Tower A
- List of tallest buildings in China
